= List of municipalities of the Metropolitan City of Capital Rome =

The following is a list of the 121 municipalities (comuni) of the Metropolitan City of Rome Capital in the region of Lazio in Italy.

== List ==
Municipality	Population (2026)	Area (km^{2})	Density
Affile	1,403	15.11	92.9
Agosta	1,679	9.50	176.7
Albano Laziale	39,706	23.80	1,668.3
Allumiere	3,772	92.17	40.9
Anguillara Sabazia	19,037	75.24	253.0
Anticoli Corrado	841	16.22	51.8
Anzio	60,063	43.65	1,376.0
Arcinazzo Romano	1,245	28.31	44.0
Ardea	51,374	72.09	712.6
Ariccia	17,938	18.59	964.9
Arsoli	1,347	12.20	110.4
Artena	13,676	54.80	249.6
Bellegra	2,578	18.78	137.3
Bracciano	18,349	143.06	128.3
Camerata Nuova	403	40.50	10.0
Campagnano di Roma	10,987	46.94	234.1
Canale Monterano	4,164	36.92	112.8
Canterano	343	7.37	46.5
Capena	11,071	29.51	375.2
Capranica Prenestina	310	20.36	15.2
Carpineto Romano	3,911	86.29	45.3
Casape	610	5.38	113.4
Castel Gandolfo	8,536	14.19	601.6
Castel Madama	7,022	28.80	243.8
Castel San Pietro Romano	838	15.29	54.8
Castelnuovo di Porto	8,610	30.57	281.6
Cave	10,935	17.88	611.6
Cerreto Laziale	1,075	12.08	89.0
Cervara di Roma	453	31.75	14.3
Cerveteri	38,206	134.32	284.4
Ciampino	38,913	13.00	2,993.3
Ciciliano	1,248	18.85	66.2
Cineto Romano	579	10.37	55.8
Civitavecchia	51,359	73.74	696.5
Civitella San Paolo	2,046	20.75	98.6
Colleferro	20,381	26.99	755.1
Colonna	4,226	3.55	1,190.4
Fiano Romano	16,893	41.19	410.1
Filacciano	481	5.66	85.0
Fiumicino	83,415	213.89	390.0
Fonte Nuova	32,787	19.94	1,644.3
Formello	13,925	31.15	447.0
Frascati	22,948	22.48	1,020.8
Gallicano nel Lazio	6,578	25.70	256.0
Gavignano	1,854	15.04	123.3
Genazzano	5,737	32.07	178.9
Genzano di Roma	22,329	17.90	1,247.4
Gerano	1,110	10.12	109.7
Gorga	649	26.19	24.8
Grottaferrata	20,345	18.40	1,105.7
Guidonia Montecelio	89,420	79.47	1,125.2
Jenne	324	31.45	10.3
Labico	6,409	11.75	545.4
Ladispoli	40,968	25.95	1,578.7
Lanuvio	12,897	43.76	294.7
Lariano	13,297	22.53	590.2
Licenza	988	17.99	54.9
Magliano Romano	1,379	20.52	67.2
Mandela	931	13.72	67.9
Manziana	7,838	24.00	326.6
Marano Equo	757	7.65	99.0
Marcellina	7,160	15.36	466.1
Marino	46,667	24.19	1,929.2
Mazzano Romano	2,935	29.07	101.0
Mentana	22,615	24.27	931.8
Monte Compatri	11,633	24.57	473.5
Monte Porzio Catone	8,597	9.13	941.6
Monteflavio	1,150	16.84	68.3
Montelanico	2,003	35.14	57.0
Montelibretti	5,098	45.43	112.2
Monterotondo	41,185	40.94	1,006.0
Montorio Romano	1,908	23.39	81.6
Moricone	2,373	19.59	121.1
Morlupo	8,553	24.08	355.2
Nazzano	1,298	12.40	104.7
Nemi	1,854	7.33	252.9
Nerola	1,961	17.10	114.7
Nettuno	48,111	71.64	671.6
Olevano Romano	6,292	26.16	240.5
Palestrina	22,110	47.02	470.2
Palombara Sabina	13,157	75.80	173.6
Percile	213	17.76	12.0
Pisoniano	711	12.92	55.0
Poli	2,233	21.75	102.7
Pomezia	64,970	86.57	750.5
Ponzano Romano	1,265	19.52	64.8
Riano	10,494	25.43	412.7
Rignano Flaminio	10,170	38.56	263.7
Riofreddo	750	12.38	60.6
Rocca Canterano	170	15.84	10.7
Rocca di Cave	364	11.09	32.8
Rocca di Papa	17,989	39.72	452.9
Rocca Priora	12,130	28.27	429.1
Rocca Santo Stefano	906	9.57	94.7
Roccagiovine	246	8.41	29.3
Roiate	639	10.35	61.7
Rome	2,745,062	1287.36	2,132.3
Roviano	1,232	8.50	144.9
Sacrofano	7,512	28.43	264.2
Sambuci	833	8.30	100.4
San Cesareo	16,383	23.64	693.0
San Gregorio da Sassola	1,385	35.45	39.1
San Polo dei Cavalieri	2,804	42.53	65.9
San Vito Romano	3,012	12.66	237.9
Sant'Angelo Romano	5,066	18.02	281.1
Sant'Oreste	3,398	21.60	157.3
Santa Marinella	18,445	9.03	2,042.6
Saracinesco	177	11.16	15.9
Segni	8,961	60.86	147.2
Subiaco	8,527	63.23	134.9
Tivoli	55,321	68.65	805.8
Tolfa	4,691	168.27	27.9
Torrita Tiberina	1,116	10.78	103.5
Trevignano Romano	5,755	38.99	147.6
Vallepietra	223	52.94	4.2
Vallinfreda	260	16.72	15.6
Valmontone	15,654	40.91	382.6
Velletri	53,048	118.23	448.7
Vicovaro	3,520	35.94	97.9
Vivaro Romano	150	12.54	12.0
Zagarolo	18,963	28.04	676.3

== See also ==
- List of municipalities of Lazio
- List of municipalities of Italy
