= Pisoniano =

- Comune
- Comune di Pisoniano
- Location of Pisoniano in the Metropolitan City of Rome Capital

- Location within Lazio Location within Italy Location within European Union
- Coordinates: 41°54′N 12°58′E
- Country: Italy
- Region: Lazio
- Metropolitan city: Rome (RM)

Government
  - Mayor: Enzo Aureli

Area
  - Total: 13.2 km^{2} (5.1 sq mi)
- Elevation: 532 m (1,745 ft)

Population (30 November 2016)
  - Total: 755
  - Density: 57.2/km^{2} (148/sq mi)
- Time zone: UTC+1 (CET)
  - Summer (DST): UTC+2 (CEST)
- Postal code: 00020
- Dialing code: 06
- Website: comune.pisoniano.rm.it

Pisoniano is a comune (municipality) in the Metropolitan City of Rome in the Italian region Lazio, located about 40 kilometres (25 mi) east of Rome.

Pisoniano borders the following municipalities: Bellegra, Capranica Prenestina, Cerreto Laziale, Ciciliano, Gerano, San Vito Romano.

== Twin towns ==
- Sannat, Malta
