= Rocca Canterano =

- Comune
- Comune di Rocca Canterano
- Location within Italy Location within Lazio
- Coordinates: 41°57′N 13°1′E
- Country: Italy
- Region: Lazio
- Metropolitan city: Rome (RM)

Government
  - Mayor: Fulvio Proietti

Area
  - Total: 15.84 km^{2} (6.12 sq mi)
- Elevation: 745 m (2,444 ft)

Population (31 December 2014)
  - Total: 196
  - Density: 12.4/km^{2} (32.0/sq mi)
- Demonym: Roccacanteranesi
- Time zone: UTC+1 (CET)
  - Summer (DST): UTC+2 (CEST)
- Postal code: 00020
- Dialing code: 0774
- Website: Official website

Rocca Canterano is a comune (municipality) in the Metropolitan City of Rome in the Italian region of Latium, located about 45 kilometres (28 mi) east of Rome.

Rocca Canterano borders the following municipalities: Agosta, Anticoli Corrado, Canterano, Cerreto Laziale, Gerano, Marano Equo, Saracinesco.

== People ==
- Florestano Di Fausto, architect, engineer and politician
