= Mandela, Lazio =

Mandela
- Comune
- Comune di Mandela
- Coat of arms

- Location within Italy Location within Lazio
- Coordinates: 42°2′N 12°55′E
- Country: Italy
- Region: Lazio
- Metropolitan city: Rome (RM)

Government
  - Mayor: Claudio Pettinelli

Area
  - Total: 13.7166 km^{2} (5.2960 sq mi)
- Elevation: 487 m (1,598 ft)

Population (31 August 2020)
  - Total: 889
  - Density: 64.8/km^{2} (168/sq mi)
- Demonym: Mandelesi
- Time zone: UTC+1 (CET)
  - Summer (DST): UTC+2 (CEST)
- Postal code: 00020
- Dialing code: 0774

Mandela is a comune (municipality) in the Metropolitan City of Rome in the Italian region of Lazio, located about 40 kilometres (25 mi) northeast of Rome. It sits on a hill between the Licenza stream and the Aniene River. It is part of the Valle dell'Aniene Mountain Community.

Mandela borders the following municipalities: Anticoli Corrado, Cineto Romano, Licenza, Percile, Roccagiovine, Roviano, Saracinesco, Vicovaro.
