= Ciciliano =

- Comune
- Comune di Ciciliano
- Location within Italy Location within Lazio
- Coordinates: 41°58′N 12°56′E
- Country: Italy
- Region: Lazio
- Metropolitan city: Rome (RM)

Government
  - Mayor: Massimiliano Calore

Area
  - Total: 18.85 km^{2} (7.28 sq mi)
- Elevation: 619 m (2,031 ft)

Population (30 June 2017)
  - Total: 1,318
  - Density: 69.92/km^{2} (181.1/sq mi)
- Demonym: Cicilianesi or Cicilianelli
- Time zone: UTC+1 (CET)
  - Summer (DST): UTC+2 (CEST)
- Postal code: 00020
- Dialing code: 0774
- Website: Official website

Ciciliano is a comune (municipality) in the Metropolitan City of Rome in the Italian region of Latium, located about 35 kilometres (22 mi) east of Rome.

Ciciliano borders the following municipalities: Capranica Prenestina, Castel Madama, Cerreto Laziale, Pisoniano, Sambuci, San Gregorio da Sassola.

It was most likely founded by the ancient Aniensis tribe and became the Roman town of Trebula Suffenas.

At one time, it was a stronghold of the Saracens.

== See also ==
- History of Islam in southern Italy
- Saracinesco
- Nocera Inferiore
