= Mariano da Roccacasale =

Italian religious (1778–1866)

Blessed Mariano da Roccacasale O.F.M.

Religious
- Born: 13 January 1778; Roccacasale, L'Aquila, Papal States
- Died: 31 May 1866 (aged 88); Bellegra, Rome, Kingdom of Italy
- Venerated in: Roman Catholic Church
- Beatified: 3 October 1999, Saint Peter's Square, Vatican City by Pope John Paul II
- Feast: 31 May
- Attributes: Franciscan habit

Mariano da Roccacasale (13 January 1778 – 31 May 1866) - born Domenico di Nicolantonio - was an Italian Roman Catholic professed religious from the Order of Friars Minor. He was of peasant stock and entered the order in his twenties as a professed religious rather than as an ordained priest. He was an influence in the decision of Giuseppe Oddi joining the Franciscans after their 1863 encounter. He became titled as a Servant of God under Pope Leo XIII on 12 December 1895 with the commencement of the canonization cause. He received the title Venerable in 1923 under Pope Pius XI; Roccacasale was beatified - alongside Oddi - when Pope John Paul II presided over the late Franciscans' beatification on 3 October 1999.

== Life ==
Domenico di Nicolantonio was born on 13 January 1778 in L'Aquila as the last of six children to Gabriel di Nicolantonio and Santa de Arcángelo. His childhood nickname was "Cicchetti".

He tended to the fields as a shepherd on Mount Morrone in his childhood until the recognition of his call to the religious life in 1801. He entered the convent of the Order of Friars Minor - Saint Nicholas it was called - in Arischia in 1802 where he would serve as both a cook and gardener in addition to begging for alms until 1815. He assumed the name of "Mariano da Roccacasale" and became vested in the Franciscan habit on 2 September 1802 as a religious rather than as an ordained priest. He commenced his period of novitiate in 1802 and made his vows in 1803. He relocated to Bellegra in Rome in 1915 and there served as a porter where he was to welcome the poor as well as pilgrims.

He collapsed at the foot of the altar - on 23 May 1866 - while in meditation before the Eucharist; he was rushed to his bed and predicted his imminent death and so asked to receive the sacraments for the final time before he died. He died on 31 May 1866.

== Beatification ==
The beatification process opened in Subiaco in an informative and apostolic process that had been designated in collecting all available documentation and interrogatories pertaining to the late Franciscan's life and saintliness; the Congregation of Rites validated these processes when the documentation was sent to Rome. He became a Servant of God on 12 December 1895 under Pope Leo XIII after the formal introduction of the cause. He became titled as Venerable - on 3 May 1923 - after Pope Pius XI confirmed the fact that the late religious had lived a model Christian life of heroic virtue.

The miracle that confirmed his beatification was the cure of the infant Luigi Reposini (b. December 1916) from a severe case of encephalitis on 28 March 1918. It received diocesan investigation in Velletri from 1925 until 1926 and received C.O.R. validation on 18 April 1928. The cause remained inactive until 6 March 1997 when a board of medical experts approved the miracle and also received approval on 7 October 1997 from a team of theologians; the Congregation for the Causes of Saints approved it as well on 3 March 1998 while Pope John Paul II issued his final approval on 6 April 1998. The pontiff beatified the Franciscan friar on 3 October 1999 in Saint Peter's Square.
