= Tommaso da Cori =

Christian saint

Saint Tommaso da Cori OFM
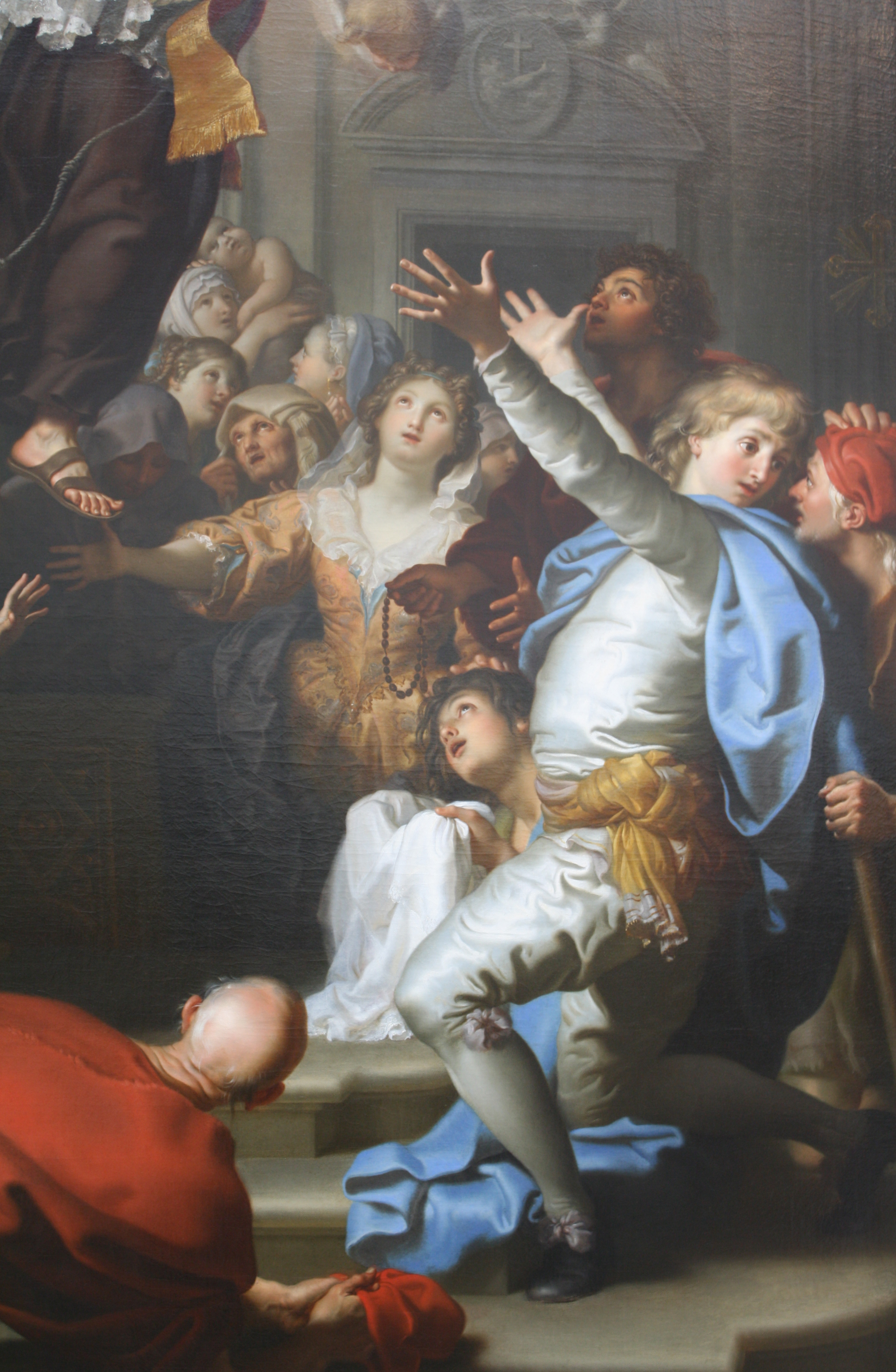
- The Levitation of Saint Thomas of Cori (Detail) by Antonio Cavallucci (1786). The saint's feet can be seen in the upper-left hand corner of the image.
- Born: 4 June 1655; Cori, Province of Rome
- Died: 11 January 1729; Civitella, Province of Rome
- Venerated in: Roman Catholic Church
- Beatified: 3 September 1786, Saint Peter's Basilica by Pope Pius VI
- Canonized: 21 November 1999, Saint Peter's Square by Pope John Paul II
- Feast: 11 January

Tommaso da Cori (4 June 1655 - 11 January 1729) - born Francesco Antonio Placidi - was an Italian Roman Catholic priest and a professed member of the Order of Friars Minor who lived as a hermit for much of his religious life. He gained fame as a noted preacher throughout the region where his hermitage was located and for this became known as the "Apostle of the Sublacense".

His beatification was celebrated under Pope Pius VI on 3 September 1786 and was beatified two centuries later in Saint Peter's Square on 21 November 1999 under Pope John Paul II.

== Life ==
Francesco Antonio Placidi was born to poor parents on 4 June 1655 in Cori near Rome. In his childhood he was dubbed "the little saint" due to the recognition of his personal holiness.

He earned a living as a shepherd as he grew up. Placidi was pious and soon became aware of the Order of Friars Minor that had come to the town. Both his parents had died at the time he turned fourteen and was therefore his task to take care of his two sisters and to find them husbands. Placidi had a strong devotion to God and so after seeing his sisters married off chose almost at once to enter consecrated life as a simple friar and entered the Order of Friars Minor at the convent of Santissima Trinitá in 1665 while commencing his novitiate on 7 February 1667. He underwent his theological and philosophical studies in Viterbo.

In 1683 - following the successful completion of his studies - he was ordained to the priesthood (he celebrated his first Mass in Velletri) and was at once appointed as the assistant master of novices in Orvieto. He soon became aware of the hermit life which was re-emerging in the order during that period and so joined a hermitage in Civitella (present Bellegra) where he lived until his death except for a brief period of time in which he was the guardian of a hermitage he founded in Palombara modeled after the one in Civitella.

Fra Tommaso followed the model of hermit life that Francis of Assisi had established in that he did not remain enclosed within the hermitage but would instead go out preaching in the small villages throughout the region. He became known for his simple and clear manner of preaching the messages of the Gospel and came to be called dubbed as the "Apostle of the Sublacense". He became known during his lifetime as a man of deep contemplation on the Gospel and often spent the night in the convent's chapel in silent meditation.

Placidi died in peace in his sleep at the beginning of 1729 in Civitella.

== Sainthood ==
The sainthood process commenced on 15 July 1737 under Pope Clement XII in which Placidi was titled as a Servant of God while a previous decree issued on 18 April 1737 allowed for the cause to commence and start on a diocesan level. The writings of the late friar received the approval of theologians assigned to assess them on 14 December 1771 and an antepreparatory committee later approved the cause sometime later on 22 February 1774; this allowed for a preparatory committee to do the same on 12 March 1776 as did a general congregation of the Congregation of Rites on 28 July 1778.

Pope Pius VI declared the late friar to be Venerable on 1 August 1778 upon the confirmation that he led a life of heroic virtue and later approved two miracles attributed to the friar on 4 October 1785 - this allowed for the pope to preside over the beatification in Saint Peter's Basilica on 3 September 1786. The pope issued a decree for the cause's resumption a decade later on 4 May 1796. The third and final miracle needed for sainthood was investigated and validated under the Congregation for the Causes of Saints before receiving the approval of a medical board on 29 January 1998. Theologians approved it on 29 May 1998 as did the C.C.S. on 19 January 1999 at which point Pope John Paul II issued definitive approval to the miracle on 26 March 1999 and canonized the friar in Saint Peter's Square on 21 November 1999.
