= Theodoli Castle, San Vito Romano =

Castle located in San Vito Romano

Theodoli Castle
- Castello Theodoli
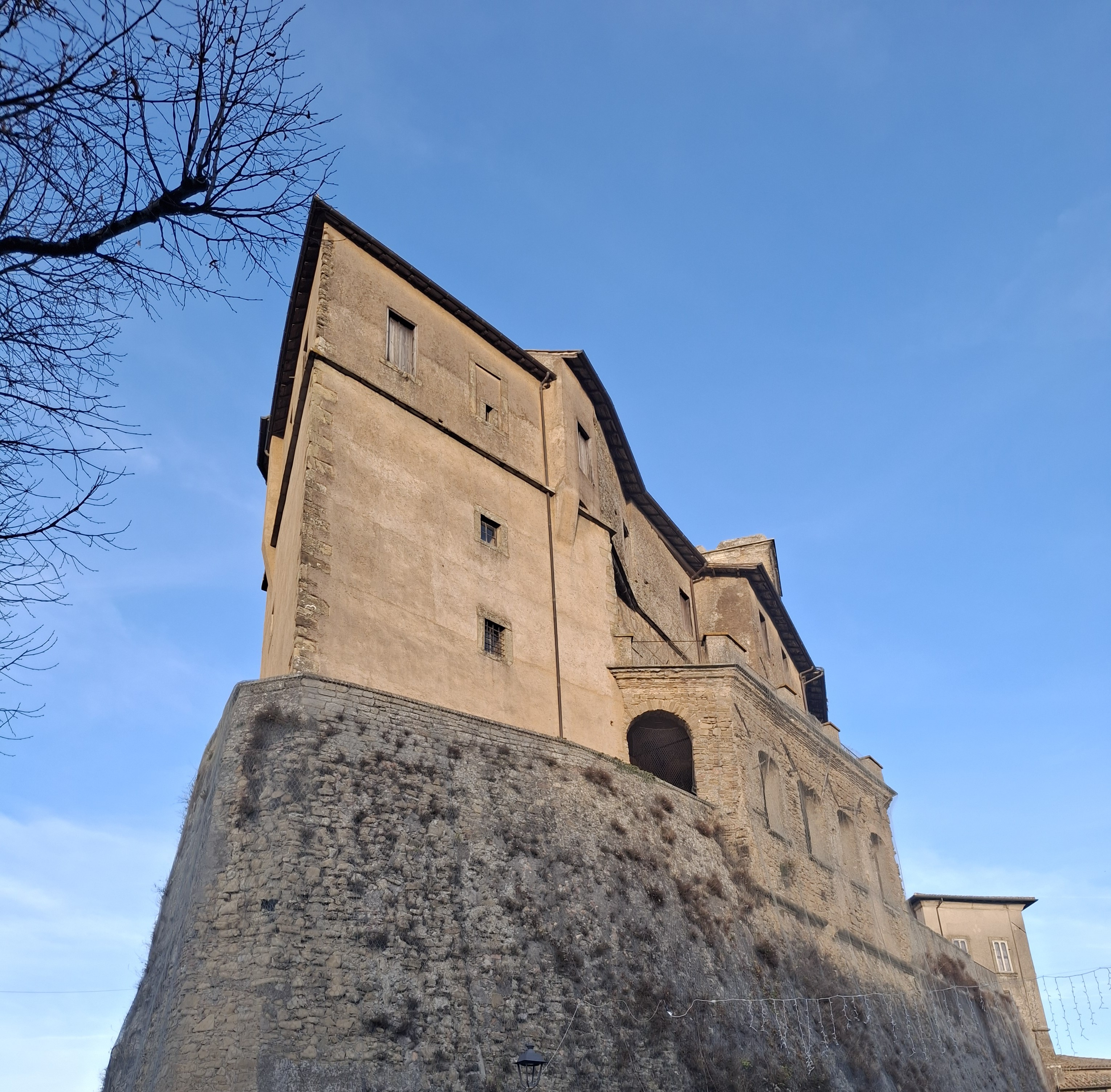
- A photo showcasing the castle
- Interactive map of Theodoli Castle

General information
- Location: San Vito Romano, Italy
- Coordinates: 41.882881°N 12.983334°E
- Year built: IX Century

The Theodoli Castle is a currently privately-owned castle located in the town of San Vito Romano, in Italy.

== History ==
The oldest parts of the castle were built in IX century after the Saracen invasion of Italy and the sacking of the now no longer existing towns of Verugine and Vitellia. During this period the Borgo gate adjacent to the castle was also built as a way to protect the newly formed settlement created from the refugees fleeing the previously mentioned towns.

The castle was expanded in the XIII century.

According to some historians (such as Leonardo Cecconi) and the local Sanvitese tradition, pope Martin V was born within the walls of the castle, during the reign of the House of Colonna. This is subject to significant historical debate. The room where he was born was later turned into an in-door chapel by Gerolamo Theodoli.

In the 16th century the castle became the property of the Theodoli family, which still own it up until today.

== Characteristics ==
The building is characterized by its boat shape, and the inside of the building is full of paintings and frescoes, many of which attributed to Crescenzio Onofri. It features arched loggias overlooking Corso Mario Theodoli, while the main entrance is on the rear side, which overlooks the church of Santa Maria de' Arce.

== Accessibility ==
The castle cannot be visited as it is the private property of the Theodoli family, which still regularly live within its walls. Any visit must have their prior permission.
