= Arcangelo di Cola =

Italian painter

Arcangelo di Cola (active 1416–1429) was an Italian painter, active throughout central Italy in a late Gothic style.

He was born in Camerino, but it is unknown where he trained, but was influenced by Gentile da Fabriano. He was known in 1416 to be painting frescoes in the Palazzo comunale of Città di Castello. In 1420, he had been inscribed in the guild of painters in Florence. He painted in 1421 a canvas now lost for the Florentine church of Santa Lucia dei Magnoli. In 1422, he was recruited by Pope Martin V to Rome, and putatively sent to fresco the Oratory of the Annunziata at Riofreddo in the region of the Lazio.

He is best known for a triptych (1425) painted for the Monastero dell'Isola in Marche. In 1899, the piece was dismembered and sold.
