= Anticoli =

Anticoli may refer to:

- Anticoli Corrado, municipality in the Metropolitan City of Rome in the Italian region Latium
- Anticoli di Campagna, old name of Fiuggi
