= Saracinesco =

- Comune
- Comune di Saracinesco
- Saracinesco within Lazio

- Location within Italy Location within Lazio
- Coordinates: 42°0′N 12°57′E
- Country: Italy
- Region: Lazio
- Metropolitan city: Rome (RM)

Government
  - Mayor: Marco Orsola (since 7 June 2009) (Lista civica)

Area
  - Total: 11.0 km^{2} (4.2 sq mi)
- Elevation: 908 m (2,979 ft)

Population (1 January 2016)
  - Total: 185
  - Density: 16.8/km^{2} (43.6/sq mi)
- Demonym: Saracinescani
- Time zone: UTC+1 (CET)
  - Summer (DST): UTC+2 (CEST)
- Postal code: 00020
- Dialing code: 0774
- Patron saint: St. Michael Archangel
- Saint day: Last Sunday in September
- Website: Official website

Saracinesco is a comune (municipality) in the Metropolitan City of Rome in the Italian region Lazio, located about 40 kilometres (25 mi) northeast of Rome.

Saracinesco borders the following municipalities: Anticoli Corrado, Cerreto Laziale, Mandela, Rocca Canterano, Sambuci, Vicovaro. It lies on top of one of the highest mountains in the Aniene river valley.

It has been described as situated "in a most singular and inaccessible position" and as "remarkable for the ancient costumes and customs of its inhabitants.", due to its location on a rocky outcrop towering 900 metres (3,000 ft) above the Aniene river valley. It is reached by branching off from the Rome-L'Aquila highway at the Vicovaro-Mandela exit and follow a steeply twisting mountain road that leads up to and ends at the town.

== Origins ==
The town was created after a group of raiding Arabs (known by medieval Italians as the Saracens) were cut off from the main Muslim force following the 846 Arab raid against Rome. These trapped Arabs took refuge on top of the rocky outcrop that would become the settlement of Saracinesco. They wisely decided to convert to Christianity as a condition of their surrender to local forces, and as a result were allowed to settle on their mountain refuge, forming Saracinesco. Their descendants include the modern dwellers of the village, such as Giuseppe Dell'Ali, who was recorded as the village mayor in 2005. In 2011, the succeeding mayor acknowledged the Arab heritage of the village.

The name Saracinesco appears in an inscription dated to 1052 under the name Rocca Sarraceniscum.

Many local names derive from Arabic (such as Almanzor, which in the 19th century was described as "not uncommon" in the village) and there are also many typical Arab features in the buildings. Some other common Arab names heard among villagers, and noted by Antonio Nibby, include Mastorre, Argante, Morgante, Marocco, Merant, Manasse and Margutte.

Its coat of arms contains the image of two heads of Saracens overlooking a castle.

== Main sights ==
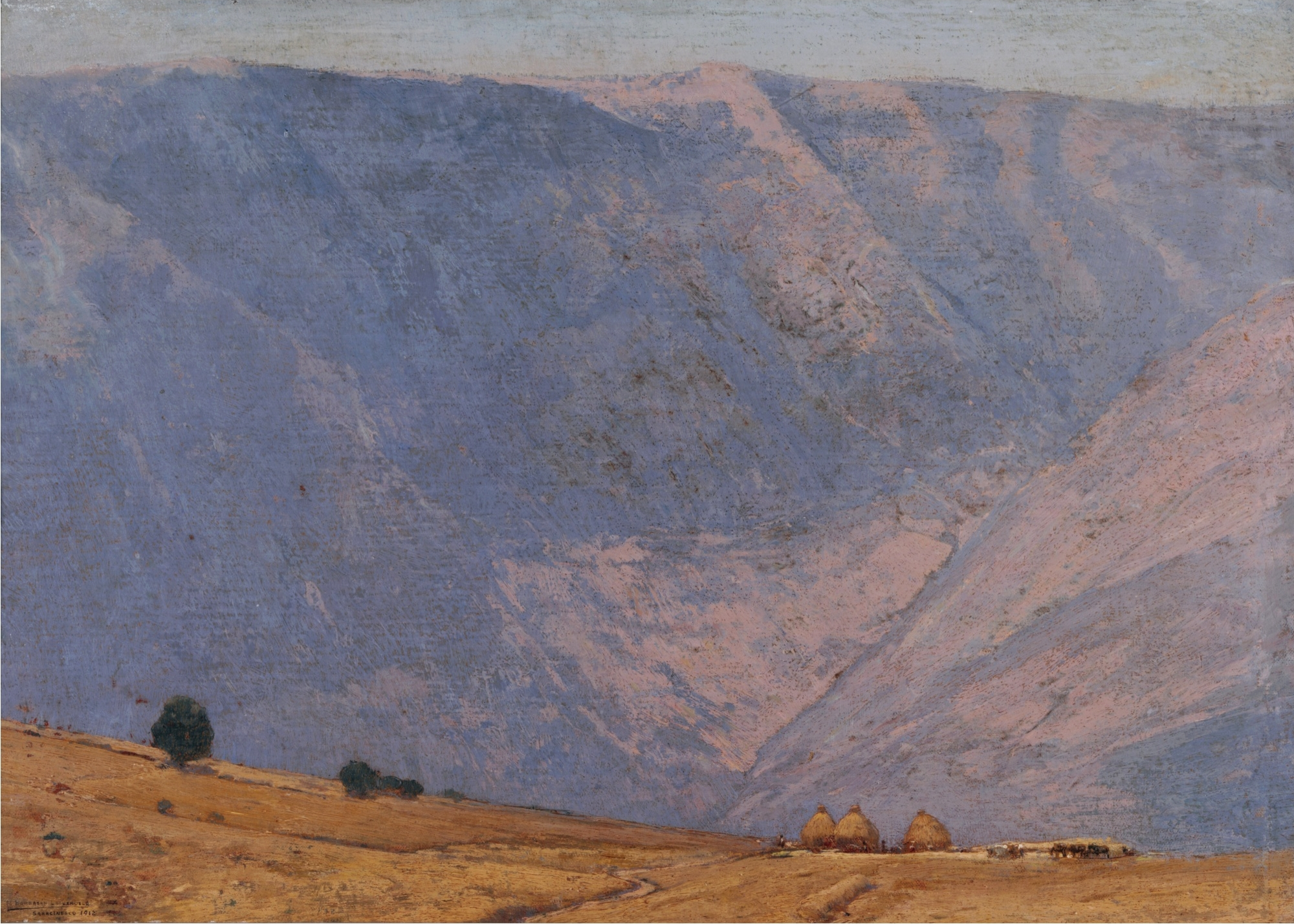
A landscape by Mariano Barbasán, 1912.

The project for the Museum of Time was conceived partly as a tribute to the town's ancestors, as the Arabs were considered the leading mathematicians in the Middle Ages.

In 1999 the Lazio region ran a competition amongst all the small towns or comuni to see who could come up with the best ideas for improving their town and creating some feature of interest and attraction. Saracinesco's Museum of Time was one of the 16 projects chosen.

The museum was subsequently founded between 2001 and 2002 with regional backing, as an itinerary along the narrow, echoing old streets that wind round the foot of the former citadel. The route leads to various models of sundials, all scientifically reconstructed by astrophysicist Andrea Carusi, and architect Roberto Ziantoni.

The most striking is the monumental Carpe Diem sundial which, from its dominant position high on the rock face of the fortress, can be seen for miles around. It is also the most common vertical type of sundial, the one that we are used to seeing on south-facing walls of churches and public buildings. At sunset, this Saracinesco clock captures the rays of the sinking sun and reflects them over the darkening valleys. In addition, it camouflages an ugly cement wall that contains the town's water cistern. Improving the appearance of the place was one of the objectives of the Lazio competition.

A flight of steps on the left leads up to a terrace at the very top of the town, where there is a huge horizontal sundial set into the pavement. It has been positioned to lie parallel to the horizon.

A more unusual type of sun clock sits in the little park right under the Carpe Diem sundial. Known as a Lambert clock after the 18th-century German mathematician and physicist Johann Heinrich Lambert, it takes the form of a circular basin of water, with the hours marked beneath the surface. Following the route through the village, you can also admire a model of an equatorial (also called an equinox) sundial, composed of two half hoops of stainless steel, which mark the hours and the meridian, and a reproduction of the Sphere of Matelica. This instrument was discovered in the small town of Matelica in the Marche region of Italy in 1985, while work was being carried out to consolidate the foundations of Palazzo del Governo. A marble sphere, it was marked with a series of lines, concentric circles, holes and letters of the Greek alphabet. Set in the correct position, it registered the hours of sunrise, the length of the day, the solstices and equinoxes and the passage of the sun through the constellations. There is only one other known example of this kind of sundial, which was found in Greece in 1939.

There is also a model of the cylindrical Shepherd's Clock, sitting on a low wall in the main square, beside the historic church of S. Michele Arcangelo. This instrument is attributed to the 11th-century German monk Hermannus Contractus. The Saracinesco example is a large column of stainless steel, but normally these sun clocks are small and portable.

== Demographics ==
The inhabitants are noted for their oriental features, with the male inhabitants "noted for swarthy good looks" and its females described as being "of fabled beauty for which the village was once famous," and were in demand in Rome as artists models at the turn of the 19th century due to their exotic dark looks.

== See also ==
- Ciciliano
- Nocera Inferiore, historical Saracen settlement in mainland Italy
