= Roviano =

- Comune
- Comune di Roviano
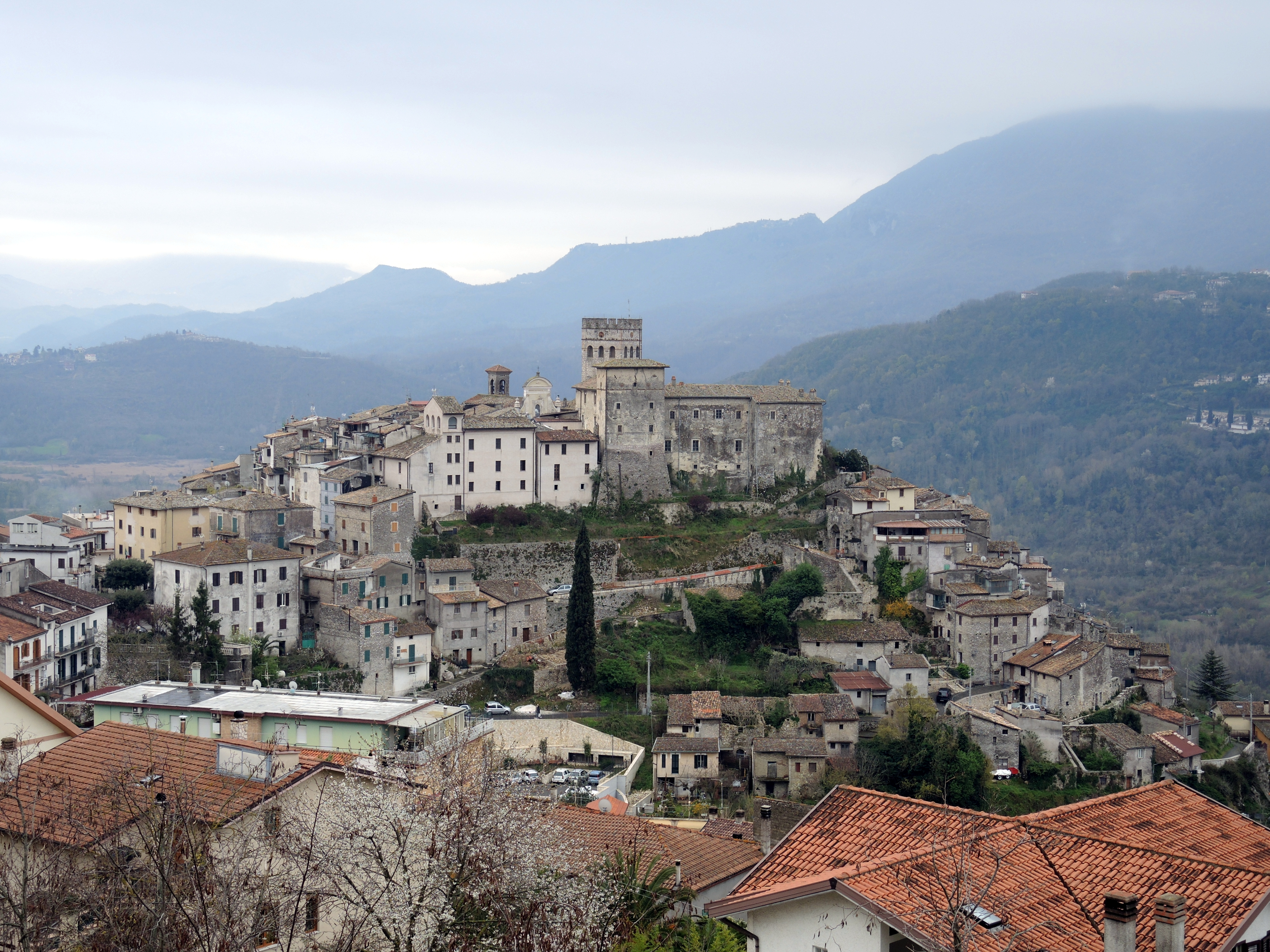
- View of Roviano

- Coat of arms

- Location within Italy Location within Lazio
- Coordinates: 42°2′N 12°59′E
- Country: Italy
- Region: Lazio
- Metropolitan city: Rome (RM)

Government
  - Mayor: Sandro Ceccarelli

Area
  - Total: 8.5 km^{2} (3.3 sq mi)
- Elevation: 523 m (1,716 ft)

Population (31 August 2020)
  - Total: 1,295
  - Density: 150/km^{2} (390/sq mi)
- Demonym: Rovianesi
- Time zone: UTC+1 (CET)
  - Summer (DST): UTC+2 (CEST)
- Postal code: 00027
- Dialing code: 0774
- Patron saint: St. John the Baptist
- Saint day: August 29
- Website: Official website

Roviano is a comune (municipality) in the Metropolitan City of Rome in the Italian region of Latium, located about 45 kilometres (28 mi) northeast of Rome.

Roviano borders the following municipalities: Anticoli Corrado, Arsoli, Cineto Romano, Mandela, Marano Equo, Riofreddo. It is home to polygonal walls dating to the late Aequi age, or to the early Roman domination. It has also a bridge dating to the reign of Nerva, over which the via Valeria crossed the Aniene river.

Other sights include the castle, built by the abbots of Italy, the medieval borough of Rovianello (destroyed by Muzio Colonna in 1585–90), the 14th century Porta Scaramuccia ("Skirmish Gate").
