= Sanctuary of Our Lady of Compigliano =

Catholic shrine located in San Vito Romano

- Santuario della Madonna di Compigliano
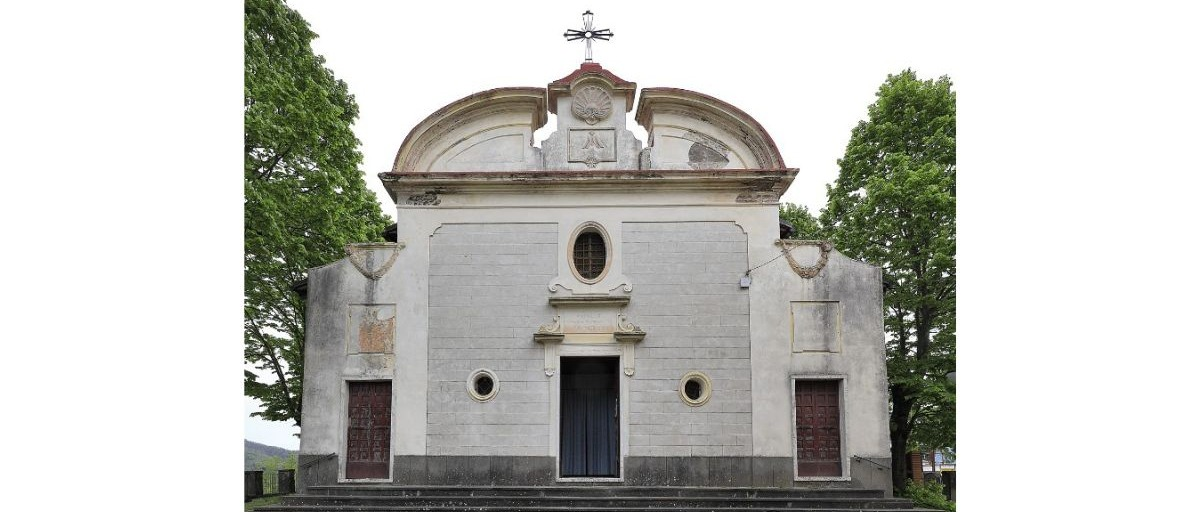
- Image of the Sanctuary from upfront

Religion
- Affiliation: Catholicism
- Region: Lazio
- Deity: Mary, mother of Jesus

Location
- Location: San Vito Romano
- Country: Italy
- Interactive map of Sanctuary of Our Lady of Compigliano
- Coordinates: 41.878452°N 12.982814°E

The Sanctuary of Our Lady of Compigliano is a catholic shrine dedicated to Mary and located in San Vito Romano, Italy.

== History ==
In the 16th century a road known as "Campigliano road" was located where the sanctuary is today. On that road, according to the local folklore, the virgin Mary (the mother of Jesus) appeared before a deaf-mute farmer who was passing by. After that encounter, the man, according to the story, was able to speak and hear again.

The building was finalized in the 17th century and was renovated in the 18th century, the late 19th century and for the last time in 1925. In its original form, it seems the complex had a single nave.

It was given the title of "sanctuary" by the Vatican authories in 1948, after the recognition of the story regarding the farmer by the Church, and the apparition of Mary also being recognized.

It is a place of pilgrimage even today.

== Characteristics ==
The sanctuary has later naves that were constructed in 1890, and the sacristy was instead willed by the local Sallusti family. The organ was gifted in 1918 by Paolo Quaresima to honor the memory of his son Nicola who died in the Battle of Gorizia in World War I. On the sides of the presbytery, facing each other, there is an image of Saint Anne together with the Virgin Mary on one side and Saint Joachim on the other, while in the arches are depicted Saint Francis of Assisi and Saint Francesca Romana.

== In folklore ==
The survival of the community of San Vito Romano is attributed by the local population to the miracles granted by the Virgin Mary and the sanctuary.
