= Giuseppe Oddi =

Blessed Giuseppe Oddi O.F.M. Cap.

Religious
- Born: 6 June 1839; Vallinfreda, Rome, Papal States
- Died: 3 June 1919 (aged 79); Bellegra, Rome, Kingdom of Italy
- Venerated in: Roman Catholic Church
- Beatified: 3 October 1999, Saint Peter's Square, Vatican City by Pope John Paul II
- Feast: 3 June
- Attributes: Capuchin habit

Giuseppe Oddi (6 June 1839 - 3 June 1919) was an Italian Roman Catholic professed religious - though not a priest - of the Franciscan Order of Friars Minor Capuchin. He felt drawn to religious life after his adolescence and was resolved to become a Franciscan upon seeing the example that Mariano da Roccacasale set. Upon his profession of vows he assumed the religious name of "Diego da Vallinfreda". Oddi was beatified - alongside Mariano da Roccacasale - when Pope John Paul II presided over the late Franciscans' beatification on 3 October 1999.

== Life ==
Giuseppe Oddi was born in Vallinfreda on 6 June 1839 to the poor but pious Vincenzo Oddi and Bernardina Pasquali. During his childhood, he had a limited education despite the fact he was receptive to learning about his faith to which he became devoted to.

At the age of 20 - in 1859 - he felt as if he were being called to the religious life and announced his desire to his parents to become a professed religious. His parents met this with fierce opposition and denied Oddi this chance. In tears, he confronted his father and said: "What am I doing? I want to go to become a saint". After sometime, in 1863 while on a pilgrimage to Rome he met Mariano da Roccacasale and was inspired with Mariano's example; this inspired Oddi to become a professed member of the Order of Friars Minor of the Franciscans. Oddi went to the convent of the Franciscans in Bellegra in 1871 and was welcomed as a postulant; he later made his solemn vows in 1889.

Oddi was known among his fellow Franciscans for his bright temperament and for his obvious and enriching faith. His personal holiness spread in reputation throughout Rome and the surrounding areas to the extent that even Pope Pius X said of him: "This is a true son of Saint Francis".

Oddi died at sunset on 3 June 1919 not long before he was to turn 80. His remains were exhumed on 12 November 1931 and were transferred to a new resting place in the presence of 3000 people.

== Beatification ==
The process for Oddi's beatification commenced in Subiaco with a diocesan process that opened in 1933 and spanned until 1937; this process was initiated in order to evaluate Oddi's life and to investigate the extent to which he exercised the virtues and led a life of personal holiness. This process occurred despite the fact that the Congregation of Rites - under Pope Paul VI - did not grant their formal approval to the initiation of the cause until 1 July 1964 - this conferred upon Oddi the posthumous title of Servant of God. Not long after another process opened in 1968 and continued the work of the first process until it closed on 26 May 1972.

The postulation then compiled the Positio as a result of previous investigations and drafted the dossier to attest to his cause and also in order to provide biographical details to Rome who would begin their own investigations; this was sent to Rome in 1987. On 22 January 1991 he was proclaimed to be Venerable after Pope John Paul II acknowledged the fact that he had lived a model Christian life of heroic virtue.

The miracle required for his beatification was investigated in Sabina-Poggio Mirteto in 1960 and was ratified as being a valid process that completed the work assigned to the set criteria on 27 September 1985. John Paul II approved it on 6 April 1998 as being a legitimate miracle and beatified Oddi on 3 October 1999.
