= San Vito Romano =

- Comune
- Comune di San Vito Romano
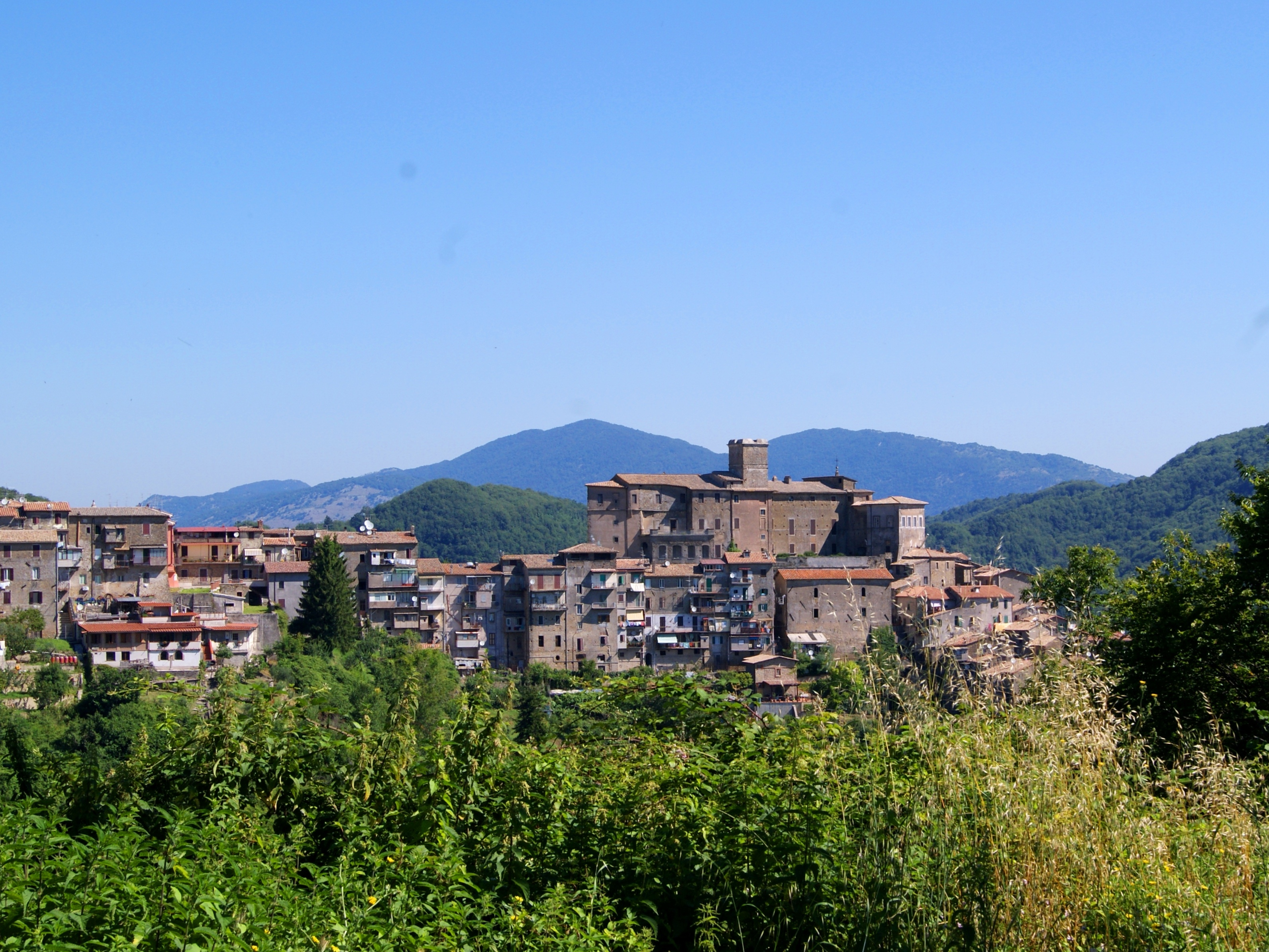
- An image of San Vito Romano from the Sanctuary of the Madonnina di Compigliano

- Location within Italy Location within Lazio
- Coordinates: 41°53′N 12°59′E
- Country: Italy
- Region: Lazio
- Metropolitan city: Rome (RM)

Government
  - Mayor: Maurizio Pasquali

Area
  - Total: 12.7 km^{2} (4.9 sq mi)
- Elevation: 655 m (2,149 ft)

Population (30 November 2016)
  - Total: 3,340
  - Density: 263/km^{2} (681/sq mi)
- Time zone: UTC+1 (CET)
  - Summer (DST): UTC+2 (CEST)
- Postal code: 00030
- Dialing code: 06
- Website: Official website

San Vito Romano (Sanvitese Romanesco: Santuitu) is a comune (municipality) of 3,320 inhabitants in the province of Rome in Lazio. It is located in the Prenestini Mountains, 50 km (31 mi) from the provincial capital: Rome.

San Vito Romano borders the following municipalities: Bellegra, Capranica Prenestina, Genazzano, Olevano Romano, Pisoniano.

The town is known as the Switzerland of Lazio for its natural beauty and the colors that characterize the seasons.

The inhabitants are called Sanvitesi (santuitisi in dialect).

== History ==
=== Antiquity ===
In antiquity, the area was inhabited by the Italic population of the Equi (Aequi), whose territory stretched along the Aniene valley as far as Varia (present-day Vicovaro).

Many assume that the town derives from a settlement that existed in Roman times known as Vitellia. This is due to Suetonius mentioning the existence of a colony called Vitellia in the area, named after the gens of Vitellia. He states that the Vitelli stood up against the Equi on their own in order to the defend the settlement.

The settlement was also mentioned by ancient historians such as Livy, Pliny the Elder, and Stephen of Byzantium.

However there is no archaeological evidence to link today's settlement of San Vito Romano to the ancient city of Vitellia.

Livy again records Vitellia as a Roman colony conquered by the Equi and placed in their territory in a strategic position.

=== Medieval period ===
In the 6th century AD, the territory was under Longobard domination, as recalled by a number of place names called ‘La Corte’, from curtis, a Longobard term to indicate the typical housing system of the Longobard era, a combination of dwelling, rural building and fortified centre.

In the 9th century AD, the territory was destroyed by the Saracens, who invaded the coastline and hinterland of Latium as far as the Sublacen territory. Those who escaped the raids took refuge on the mountain where San Vito Romano stands today, using the natural cavities in the area as a refuge. Here, with the help of the Benedictine monks, the inhabitants rebuilt the town centre that revolved around a fortress built on the top of the cliff: the name Castrum Sancti Viti appears in a document of the Prenestina curia and is probably due to the choice made by the Benedictine monks to rename it after "Saint Vito".

Two gates from this period are preserved: ‘Porta dell'Ospedale’ and ‘Porta del Ponte’, for the drawbridge that allowed the crossing of the ‘Cavoni’ gully and the entrance to the village. The gates are made with pointed arches, made of blocks with white lime binder. The other gate of San Vito, known as ‘Porta Borgo’, is located a few metres from Via delle Logge, the highest area of the village until the construction of Borgo Mario Theodoli in 1649, which will be discussed later.

Traces are found in the Regesto Sublacense of 1085, which attests the donation of some lands by the Lord of Paliano to the Monastery of Subiaco. The Sublacensis monks, similarly to some neighbouring centres, had protection over the settlement until 1180, when the castrum became the property of the Colonna family, who engaged in other struggles with the papacy, equipped the castle with new fortification works, surrounding it with a road called ‘La Difesa’, with guard functions, along which armed sentries circulated.

=== Modern period ===
San Vito was administered as a feud by the Colonna family, who remained feudal lords of the village. Rome, Genazzano and San Vito were the birthplaces of Oddone Colonna (who became pope under the name of Martin V). Throughout the Prenestina area, after Martin V's election to the papal throne, devotion to St Martin grew considerably and materialised through the erection of many aedicules: one of them, the ‘Cona di San Martino’, can still be seen in San Vito. In 1565, Marcantonio Colonna, burdened by debts, was forced to sell the ownership of the town. San Vito was bought by the Massimo family, who after just ten years, in 1575, sold it in turn to the Theodoli family, who paid 20,000 Roman scudi for it.

It was Gerolamo Theodoli, Bishop of Cadiz, who acquired the fiefdom, taking upon himself the title of Count of Ciciliano and Lord of San Vito and Pisoniano. The first Marquis of San Vito, in 1592, was Teodolo Theodoli.

The Theodoli family, marquises of San Vito in the 17th and 18th centuries, strongly determined and oriented the political and architectural life of the town itself: Giovanni Theodoli, brother of Teodolo, first Marquis of San Vito and Pisciano and Count of Ciciliano, was responsible for the design of the church of San Biagio (1607 - 1609), while Giovanni's sons Alfonso and Mario Theodoli were substantially responsible for the urban layout of San Vito: These promoted the redevelopment in 1646 of the Piazza San Biagio overlooked by the old town hall, but above all, Mario Theodoli was the architect of the design, construction and opening of the so-called ‘Borgo Mario’ in 1649. The work to build the village was long and complex, at the end of which a long, wide road was opened, flanked by buildings such as the Carmelite convent, now the Palazzo Comunale and later the site of the historical archive. Alfonso's son, Carlo Theodoli, was also the architect, who was responsible for the expansion and arrangement of the Castle: in fact, it is to him that we owe the peculiar ship-shape highlighted by the scarp wall cladding that surrounds it, and the fresco decoration of some of the rooms. The new part of the palace was enriched with a collection of paintings and the rooms on the ground floor were frescoed. Today the palace is private property.

It was in the period under the Teodolo family, moreover, that Mattia Baccelli came to San Vito around 1648: he was born into a family of Florentine bankers, originally from Firenze Peretola, and was brought to the Marquis's properties as a patrimonial administrator. In 1677, Mattia married Faustina Ronci from San Vito in his third marriage. He was also the ancestor of the minister and physician Guido Baccelli, who liked to rest from his political and academic commitments in his flat in San Vito.

=== Contemporary period ===
The territory was occupied during the Napoleonic period and was subjected by the Roman Republic's administration between 1798 and 1799, and then the Papal States up until 1870 with the only exception of the period under the Second Roman Republic.

The administration of the area under the Papacy went as follows;

- 1798: department of Circeo, canton of Paliano;

- 1810: department of Rome, district of Tivoli, canton of Olevano;

- 1816: district of Rome, district government of Tivoli, baronial place;

- 1817: department of Rome and comarca, district government of Subiaco, governor's seat;

- 1827: comarca of Rome, district of Subiaco, seat of the governor (Capranica, Civitella [Rocca S. Stefano, Rojate], Pisciano)

- 1831: comarca of Rome, district of Subiaco, seat of the governor (Capranica, Civitella, Pisciano, Rocca S. Stefano, Rojate)

After the annexation of the Papal States by the Kingdom of Italy, in 1871, the name "San Vito" was changed to "San Vito Romano" officially due to the fact that there were already other towns in Italy with similar names.

The name was officialized in the decree that follows;

‘However, in order that such an office may proceed with all the regularity that is desired, it seems to me necessary to provoke a Royal Decree so that an appellation may be added to this municipality of ours with which to distinguish it from other localities of the same name of S. Vito, of which there are forty-seven in our Kingdom, and thus avoid the very serious inconveniences that could occur in the transmigration of our correspondence’.

A vote was taken for the appellation ‘Romano’, which was undoubtedly the best due to its proximity to Rome, the capital of the Kingdom since 1871. A few weeks later, with the Royal Decree given in Naples on 16 May 1872, recalling the law of 20 March 1865, which defined the organisational aspects of the Kingdom of Italy in the aftermath of national unity, and recalling the Municipal Council resolution of 14 April, S. Vito in the province of Rome was authorised by the then King Victor Emmanuel II to take the name S. Vito Romano.

Minister Guido Baccelli was an important figure of this time. He is known for his role as the Minister of Education and Agriculture. He reformed public education by equipping it with analytical programmes. He instituted, on 21 November 1898, the first ‘National Tree Day’, which was restored to local schools in the last few years. To crown this work of agrarian and forestry economy, S. Vito inaugurated a Section of the Agricultural Institute in the area.

In the 1920s, a nucleus of prestigious political and friendly relations soon grew up around the Baccelli and the Theodoli families, thanks also to the presence of the Castellini family, with the notary Paolo, who in 1929 drafted the "Concordat between State and Church", the Ivella family, with the mayor Sisto and the pharmacist Domenico, and the Viscogliosi - Baccelli family, who became related to the minister Alfredo Rocco.

The town sent its people to fight both of the World Wars, with many being remembered in the town's war memorial.

The town however suffered the most in WW2, when there were multiple reprisals against the local population, for example the ones listed below;

1 May 1944, Monday - San Vito Romano (Rome): the Germans kill the civilian Benedetto Di Rosa by stabbing the corpse with daggers.

On 5 June 1944, a retreating German unit killed four civilians in San Vito Romano. The corpses of three of the victims are hit with daggers.

The reprisals against the locals were small but significant due to the low population of the town, that in a census in 1936 barely reached 4,200 civilians.

=== Latest historical developments ===
The most recent architectural development in the area was nearby the street known as "Viale Piave and Viale Giovanni XXIII" (named after the Pope), on the Empolitana in the direction of Pisoniano. The newly constructed chapel is known as the "Chapel of the Holy Trinity", adorned with a precious garden and built in 1994 by the people of San Vito, who do not fail to walk to the Vallepietra Sanctuary every year.

== Society ==
=== Demographic history ===
1871	2.823	0,0%	Minimal
1881	2.966	5,1%	
1901	3.706	24,9%	
1911	4.094	10,5%	
1921	4.391	7,3%	
1931	4.258	-3,0%	
1936	4.201	-1,3%	
1951	4.523	7,7%	Maximum
1961	3.895	-13,9%	
1971	3.524	-9,5%	
1981	3.180	-9,8%	
1991	3.268	2,8%	
2001	3.269	0,0%	
2016	3.339	2,1%	

- Population of San Vito Romano throughout various historical periods.

=== Folklore and tradition ===
==== Feasts and festivals ====
- Feast of St Blaise; 2 and 3 February - procession, fair and distribution of aniseed doughnuts.
- Feast of the patron saint, San Vito; 15 June or neighbouring Sunday - traditional infiorata and procession.
- Feast of the Madonnina di Compigliano; 22 August or nearby Sunday - procession with characteristic infiorata.
- Carnival Parade; 1 March.

=== Local cuisine ===
- Nusche are a typical Christmas product of San Vito Romano, a must in every kitchen in the town.
- Turkey with meatballs made of water and flour, eggless fettuccine with porcini mushrooms.
- Ravioli with local chard and ricotta, tomatoes with rice and potatoes.
- Rolls with meat sauce, yellow corn square with broccoli cooked on stone with sausages.

== Amministrazione ==
List of electoral result in the local "comunali elections".

Periodo		Primo cittadino	Partito	Carica	Note
3 June 1985	25 May 1990	Armando Cenci	Democrazia Cristiana	Mayor	
26 May 1990	13 giugno 1999	Vincenzo Nanni	Sinistra - PDS/PCI	Mayor	Two Terms
14 June 1999	13 giugno 2004	Guido Trinchieri	Civic List	Mayor	
13 June 2004	25 maggio 2014	Amedeo Rossi	Centro-sinistra	Mayor	Two Terms
26 May 2014	in carica	Maurizio Pasquali	Civic List - Focused on San Vito	Mayor	Two Terms

== Twin cities ==
- Austria Saint Veit in the Mill District

== Local sports ==
=== Football ===
ASD Audace is an amateur football club founded in 2014 by the merger of three teams: ASD Sanvitese Calcio, Audace Genazzano and ASD Empolitana Giovenzano; it plays its home matches at the Le Rose field in Genazzano and plays in the Lazio excellence league.

=== Field hockey ===
Club Hockey Libero San Vito 1967 is a hockey club that plays its home games at the Campo Comunale in Serie A1. In 2014, it hosted the Italian finals of the Under-17 category, which saw the visiting team win.

== Notable people ==
- Francesco Rocca - football player

== Representation in media and literature ==
- Secular priest Giuseppe De’ Sallusti in 1853 acknowledged San Vito Romano, by remarking;

" Santo Vito is located at the top of a high, pleasant hill, ‘where one breathes a balsamic air in a pleasant atmosphere."

- The Italian movie Il campanile d'oro (The Golden Bell Tower) was filmed in the town.
