= Casape =

- Comune
- Comune di Casape
- Coat of arms

- Location within Italy Location within Lazio
- Coordinates: 41°54′N 12°53′E
- Country: Italy
- Region: Lazio
- Metropolitan city: Rome (RM)

Government
  - Mayor: Luigino Testi

Area
  - Total: 5.3 km^{2} (2.0 sq mi)
- Elevation: 475 m (1,558 ft)

Population (31 May 2017)
  - Total: 717
  - Density: 140/km^{2} (350/sq mi)
- Demonym: Casapesi
- Time zone: UTC+1 (CET)
  - Summer (DST): UTC+2 (CEST)
- Postal code: 00010
- Dialing code: 0774
- Patron saint: St. Peter the Apostle
- Saint day: 29 June
- Website: Official website

Casape is a comune (municipality) in the Metropolitan City of Rome in the Italian region of Latium, located about 30 kilometres (19 mi) east of Rome, on the western slopes of the Monti Prenestini.

Casape borders the following municipalities: Capranica Prenestina, Poli, San Gregorio da Sassola.
