= San Gregorio da Sassola =

- Comune
- Comune di San Gregorio da Sassola
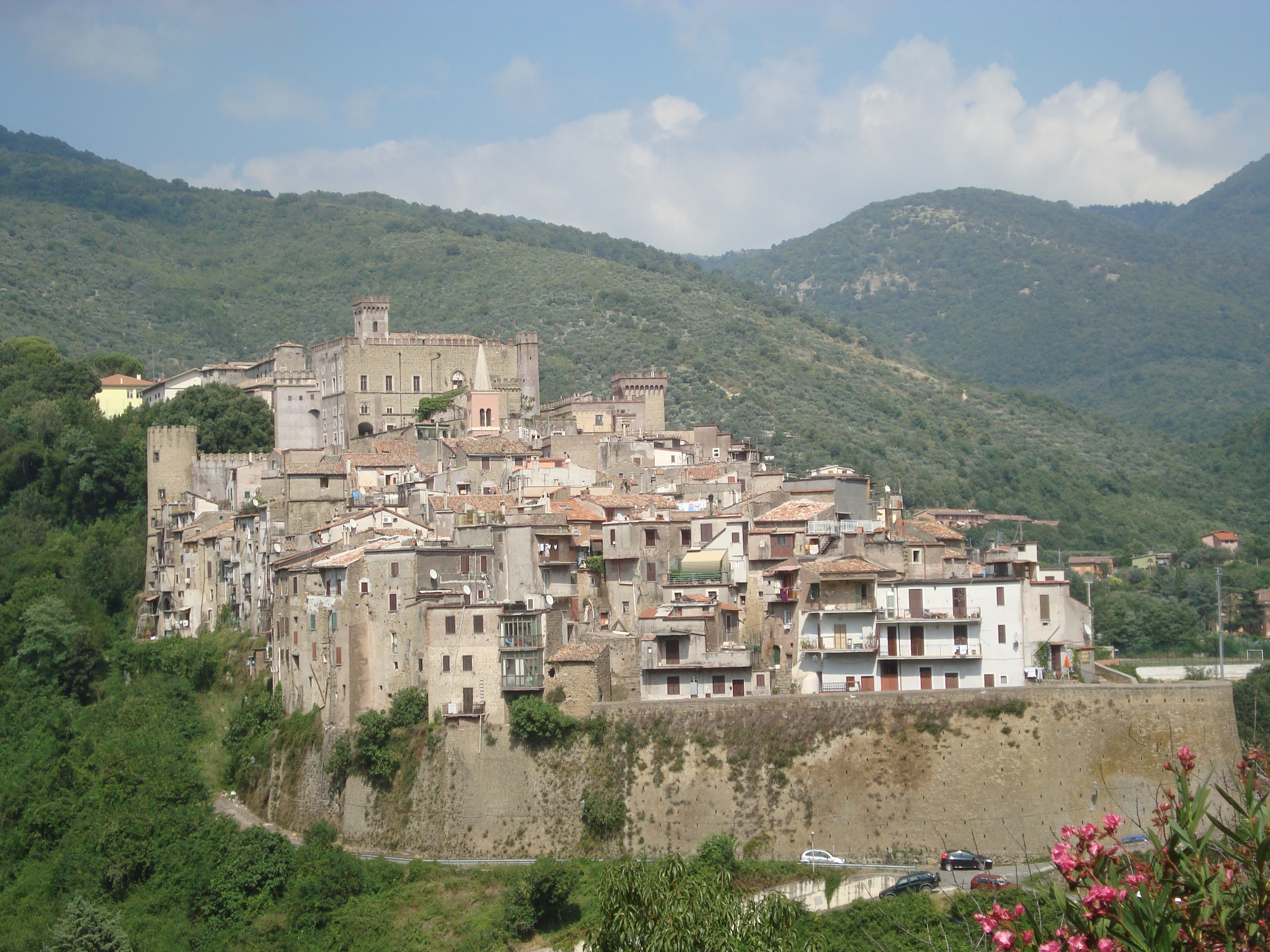
- View of San Gregorio da Sassola

- Coat of arms

- Location within Italy Location within Lazio
- Coordinates: 41°55′N 12°52′E
- Country: Italy
- Region: Lazio
- Metropolitan city: Rome (RM)

Government
  - Mayor: Franco Carocci

Area
  - Total: 35.2 km^{2} (13.6 sq mi)
- Elevation: 420 m (1,380 ft)

Population (30 April 2015)
  - Total: 1,623
  - Density: 46.1/km^{2} (119/sq mi)
- Demonym: Sangregoriani
- Time zone: UTC+1 (CET)
  - Summer (DST): UTC+2 (CEST)
- Postal code: 00010
- Dialing code: 0774
- Patron saint: St. Gregory the Great
- Saint day: 12 March
- Website: Official website

San Gregorio da Sassola is a comune (municipality) in the Metropolitan City of Rome in the Italian region of Latium, located about 30 kilometres (19 mi) east of Rome.

San Gregorio da Sassola borders the following municipalities: Capranica Prenestina, Casape, Castel Madama, Ciciliano, Poli, Rome, Tivoli.

In antiquity, the Aequian town of Aefula mentioned by both Pliny and Livy was situated within the bounds of the modern comune.

== Twin towns ==
- Hammonton, United States
