= Rocca Santo Stefano =

- Comune
- Comune di Rocca Santo Stefano
- Coat of arms

- Location within Italy Location within Lazio
- Coordinates: 41°55′N 13°1′E
- Country: Italy
- Region: Lazio
- Metropolitan city: Rome (RM)

Government
  - Mayor: Sandro Runieri

Area
  - Total: 9.7 km^{2} (3.7 sq mi)
- Elevation: 664 m (2,178 ft)

Population (31 December 2014)
  - Total: 982
  - Density: 100/km^{2} (260/sq mi)
- Demonym: Roccatani
- Time zone: UTC+1 (CET)
  - Summer (DST): UTC+2 (CEST)
- Postal code: 00030
- Dialing code: 06
- Patron saint: St. Stephen
- Saint day: 26 December and 3 August

Rocca Santo Stefano is a comune (municipality) in the Metropolitan City of Rome in the Italian region of Latium, located about 45 kilometres (28 mi) east of Rome.

Rocca Santo Stefano borders the following municipalities: Affile, Bellegra, Canterano, Gerano, Subiaco.
