= Agosta, Lazio =

Agosta
- Comune
- Comune di Agosta
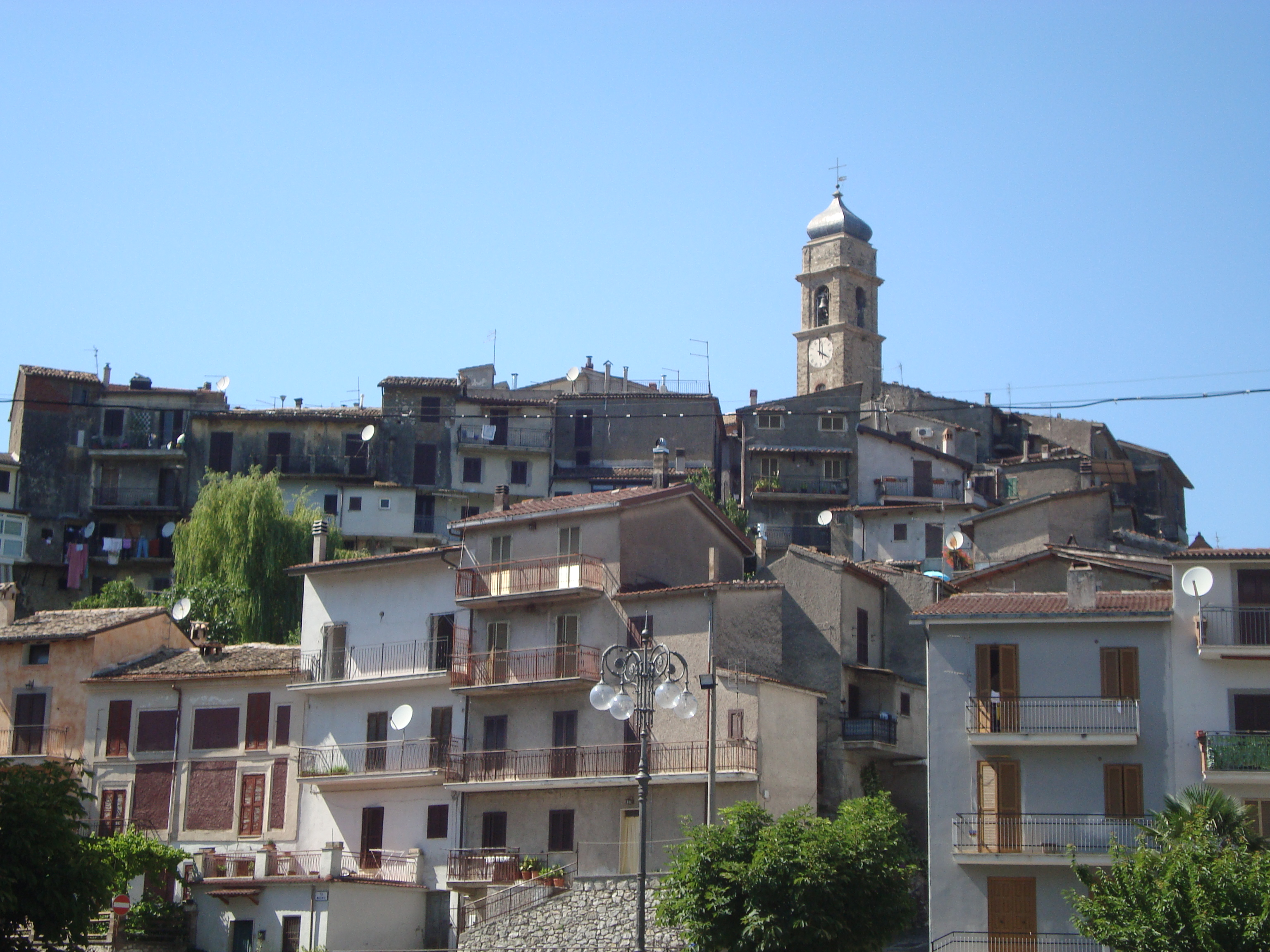
- View of Agosta

- Coat of arms

- Location of Agosta in Italy Agosta (Lazio)
- Coordinates: 41°59′N 13°2′E
- Country: Italy
- Region: Lazio
- Metropolitan city: Rome (RM)
- Frazioni: Madonna della Pace, Le Selve, Cacino, Tostini, Il Barco, La Vasca

Government
  - Mayor: Gianfranco Massimi

Area
  - Total: 9.5 km^{2} (3.7 sq mi)
- Elevation: 392 m (1,286 ft)

Population (31 August 2014)
  - Total: 1,749
  - Density: 180/km^{2} (480/sq mi)
- Demonym: Agostani
- Time zone: UTC+1 (CET)
  - Summer (DST): UTC+2 (CEST)
- Postal code: 00020
- Dialing code: 0774

Agosta (Romanesco: Austa) is a comune (municipality) in the Metropolitan City of Rome in the Italian region of Latium, located about 45 kilometres (28 mi) east of Rome.

Located on a tuff rock in the Monti Simbruini area, Agosta borders the following municipalities: Canterano, Cervara di Roma, Marano Equo, Rocca Canterano, Subiaco.

== History ==
The area of Agosta was inhabited since prehistoric times. It is mentioned in Augustus's Res Gestae as the source of the Aqua Marcia aqueduct, and after that it took its name from the Roman emperor. In 1051 AD a castle is mentioned here, which later was a possession of the monastery of Subiaco.

== Main sights ==
- Medieval castle
- Arch of the Cardinal o della Porta, built in 1503 near a bridge which at the time crossed the Aniene river.
- Sanctuary of Madonna del Passo (17th century)
