= Marquess of Estepa =

Marquessate of Estepa
- Creation date: 28 May 1543
- Created by: Charles V
- Peerage: Peerage of Spain
- First holder: Marco Centurión y Grimaldi, 1st Marquess of Estepa
- Present holder: Francisco de Borja de Arteaga y Martín, 14th Marquess of Estepa

Marquess of Estepa (Spanish: Marqués de Estepa) is a Spanish hereditary title accompanied by the dignity of Grandee and created by King Philip II by decree on 28 May 1543 and by letters patent on 20 April 1564 in favour of Marco Centurión. The title refers to the area of Andalusia of Estepa, in the province of Sevilla and its jurisdiction included the places Estepa, Alameda, Aguadulce, Badolatosa, Casariche, Gilena, Herrera, La Roda, Lora, Marinaleda–Matarredonda, Miragenil, Pedrera and Sierra de Yeguas.

== Marquesses of Estepa (1543) ==
- Marco Centurión, 1st Marquess of Estepa (d. 1565)
- Juan Bautista Centurión, 2nd Marquess of Estepa (d. 1625), son of the 1st Marquess
- Adan Centurion, 3rd Marquess of Estepa (1582–1658), son of the 2nd Marquess
- Cecilio Francisco Centurión, 4th Marquess of Estepa (d. 1685), son of the 3rd Marquess
- Luis Centurion y Centurion, 5th Marquess of Estepa (d. 1708), brother of the 4th Marquess
- Manuel Centurión y Arias Dávila, 6th Marquess of Estepa (1694–1734), son of the 5th Marquess
- Juan Bautista Centurión y Velasco, 7th Marquess of Estepa (1718–1785), son of the 6th Marquess
- María Luisa Centurión y Velasco, 8th Marchioness of Estepa (d. 1799), sister of the 7th Marquess
- Vicente Maria de Palafox Rebolledo Mexia Silva, 9th Marquess of Estepa (1756–1820), nephew of the 8th Marchioness
- María Elena de Palafox y Silva, 10th Marchioness of Estepa (1803–1837), daughter of the 9th Marquess
- Andrés Avelino de Arteaga Lazcano y Palafox, 11th Marquess of Estepa (1780–1864), nephew of the 10th Marchioness
- Andrés Avelino de Arteaga y Silva Carvajal y Téllez-Girón, 12th Marquess of Estepa (1833–1910), grandson of the 11th Marquess
- Joaquín de Arteaga y Echague Silva y Méndez de Vigo, 13th Marquess of Estepa (1870–1947), son of the 12th Marquess
- Íñigo de Arteaga y Falguera, 14th Marquess of Estepa (1905–1997), son of the 13th Marquess
- Francisco de Borja de Arteaga y Martín, 15th Marquess of Estepa, son of the 14th Marquess

== See also ==
- List of current grandees of Spain

== Bibliography ==
- Hidalgos de España, Real Asociación de (2018). Elenco de Grandezas y Títulos Nobiliarios Españoles. Ediciones Hidalguía. ISBN 978-84-94841-02-6.
