= Oratorio della Santissima Annunziata, Riofreddo =

Oratory in Region of Lazio, Italy

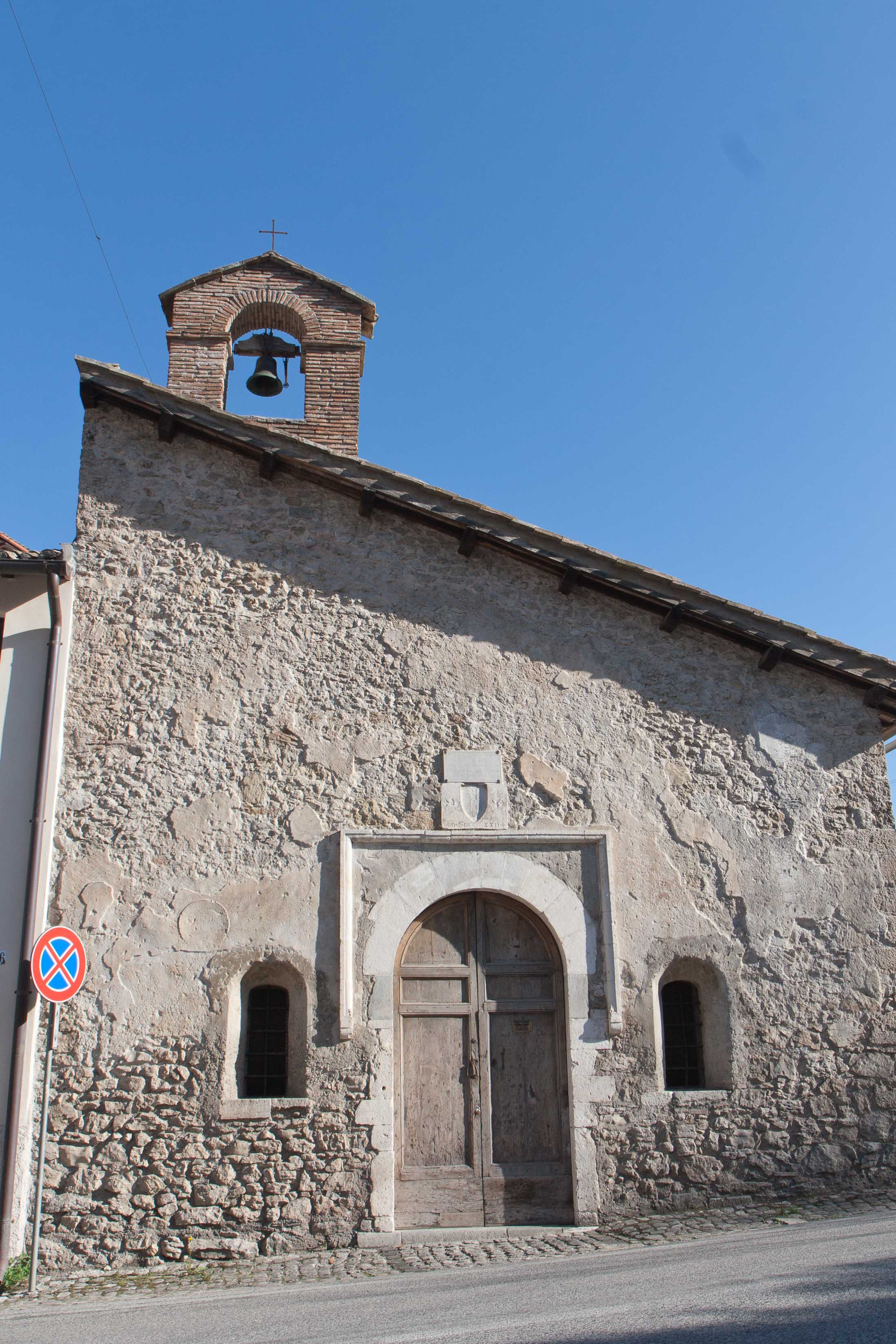
Exterior facade of the oratory.

The Oratorio della Santissima Annunziata (Oratory of the Holiest Virgin of the Annunciation) is an oratory in the town of Riofreddo, in the region of Lazio, Italy.

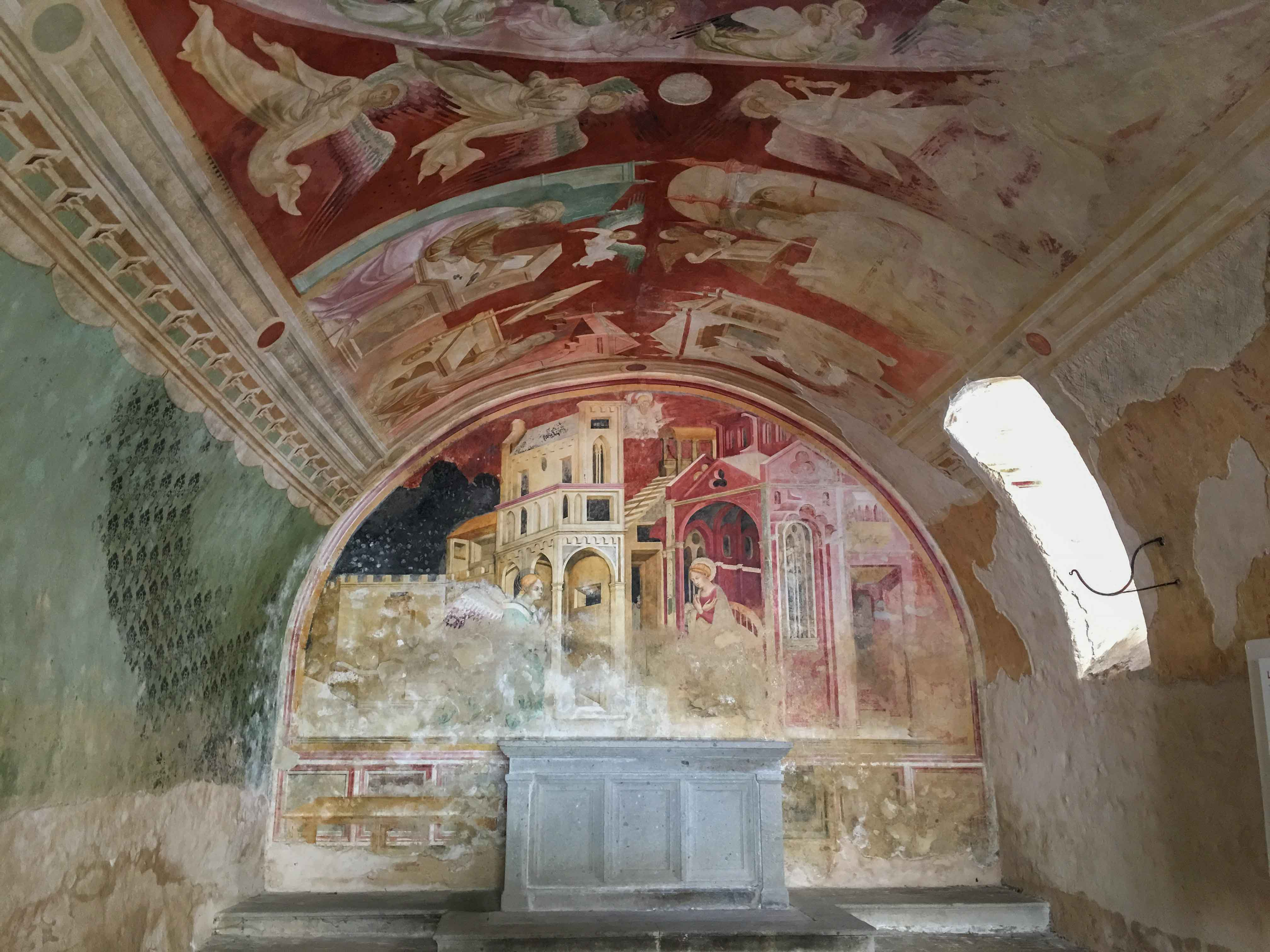
Interior of oratory facing apse

The oratory is best known for the early 15th century frescoes, commissioned by Antonio Colonna, Lord of Riofreddo, during the papacy of Martin V. The fresco behind the altar depicts the Annunciation, while the lunette has a Crucifixion. In the center of the barrel roof is a fresco of Christ in Glory surrounded by the Evangelists and Doctors of the Church, most at their desks writing. The painter Arcangelo di Cola putatively contributed to the work.

== Bibliography ==
- Michela Ramadori, L'Annunziata di Riofreddo: il contesto storico, gli affreschi, gli artisti, Pietrasecca di Carsoli, Lumen, 2009.
- Michela Ramadori, Committenza artistica dell'oratorio della SS. Annunziata di Riofreddo in relazione al matrimonio Colonna Trinci e situazione conservativa degli affreschi, in "il foglio di Lumen", 37. 2013, pp. 16-19.
