= Francesco Rocca =

Italian footballer (born 1954)

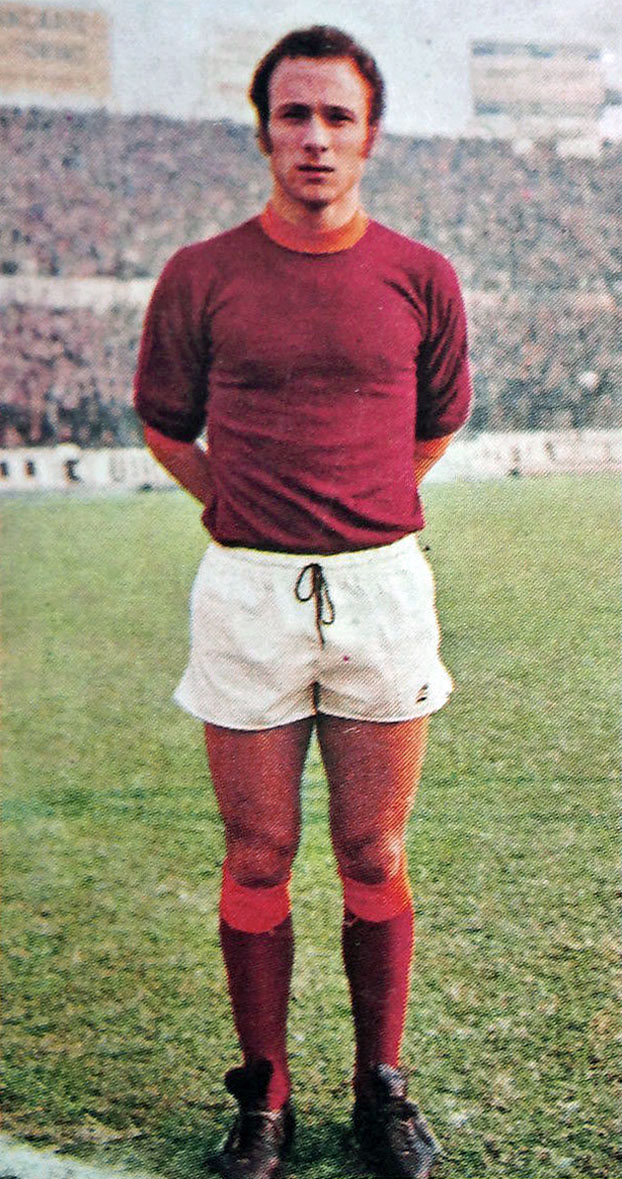
- Rocca with Roma in 1974

Personal information
- Date of birth: 2 August 1954 (age 72)
- Place of birth: San Vito Romano, Italy
- Height: 1.79 m (5 ft 10 in)
- Position: Left-back

Senior career*
Years	Team	Apps	(Gls)
1972–1981	Roma	141	(0)

International career
1973	Italy U21	1	(0)
1974–1976	Italy	18	(1)

Managerial career
- 1988: Italy Olympic
- 1995–1997: Italy U18 (equivalent to current U19)
- 1996–1998: Italy U17 (equivalent to current U18)
- 2000–2004: Italy U20
- 2004–2006: Italy U17
- 2006–2007: Italy U18
- 2006–2008: Italy U19
- 2008–2011: Italy U20
- * Club domestic league appearances and goals

Francesco Rocca (Italian pronunciation: [franˈtʃesko ˈrɔkka]; born 2 August 1954) is an Italian professional football coach and former player, who played as a defender. He spent his entire career with Italian club Roma, with whom they won the Coppa Italia twice. He was the coach of the Italy U20 national team from 2008 until 2011. He also led the Italy Olympic side to a fourth-place ranking at the 1988 Summer Olympics.

== Club career ==
Born in the San Vito Romano village 40 km from Rome, Rocca played his club football exclusively for Roma from 1972 to 1981. Rocca played 163 games for Roma, including 141 games in Serie A and 22 in the Coppa Italia cup – winning the latter competition for two consecutive years between 1980 and 1981 – but did not score any goals for the club.

At the age of 26, a serious injury forced Rocca to retire.

== International career ==
Rocca played 18 games for the Italy national team from 1974 to 1976, and scored his only international goal for Italy in a 4–0 friendly away win against the United States on 23 May 1976.

== Managerial career ==
As a manager, Rocca took Italy to a fourth place at the 1988 Summer Olympics. He also led the U-19 team which finished as the runner-up in the 2008 UEFA European Under-19 Football Championship. After the tournament he changed to being a coach of the U-20 team, and led his team to the 2009 FIFA U-20 World Cup.

He is one of eleven members of the Hall of Fame of A.S. Roma.

== Style of play ==
Rocca was nicknamed "Kawasaki" (after the Japanese brand of motor bikes) because of his pace, work-rate, energy, and durability in the left-back position; he was also an accurate crosser of the ball.

== Honours ==
Roma

- Coppa Italia: 1979–80, 1980–81

Individual

- A.S. Roma Hall of Fame: 2012
