= Nusche =

Traditional food from San Vito Romano

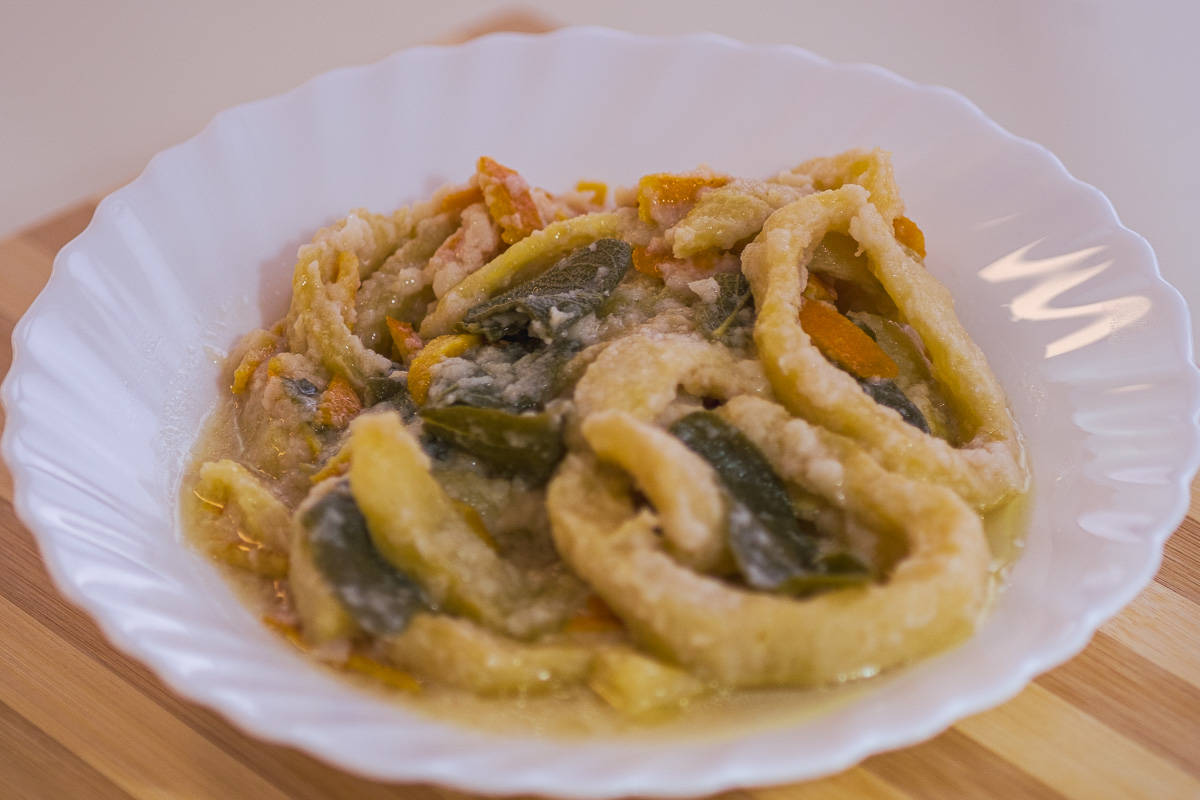
- An image of Nusche being used in a dish.
- Place of origin: San Vito Romano
- Region or state: Lazio, Italy
- Main ingredients: Courgettes; Pumpkin
- Ingredients generally used: Vinegar; Mint; Citrus zest Garlic; Sage

Nusche are a typical Christmas product of San Vito Romano, a small town in Lazio, Italy.

== Preparation ==
The preparation is based on Romanesco courgettes and begins as early as the summer, letting the courgettes grow at the maximum size. Once harvested, the pumpkin is cut into slices and left to dry in the sun strung on straws hung on the balconies. After being dried, the pumpkins are kept until Christmas when they are soaked for a day and cooked in boiling salted water, then left to drain. After that, they are floured and fried and then marinated in a preparation of vinegar, citrus zest, mint, garlic and sage. Following a few hours they are ready to be served.

== Characteristics ==
The Nusche are characterised by a ring shape and a light beige colour. The medium olfactory intensity is characterised by the pronounced notes of vinegar and sage, combined with vegetable hints of courgettes, citrus fruits and garlic. The taste is moderately salty and acidic, with a slight sweet note. Low aromatic persistence.
