= San Vito =

San Vito (Italian for "Saint Vitus") may refer to:

== Places ==
=== Settlements in Italy ===
- Bagnolo San Vito, province of Mantua
- Celle di San Vito, province of Foggia
- Monte San Vito, province of Ancona
- San Vito, Sardinia, province of Cagliari
- San Vito al Tagliamento, province of Pordenone
- San Vito al Torre, province of Udine
- San Vito Chietino, province of Chieti
- San Vito di Romagna, province of Rimini
  - Ponte di San Vito, Roman bridge
- San Vito dei Normanni, province of Brindisi
  - San Vito dei Normanni Air Station, United States Air Force facility
- San Vito di Cadore, province of Belluno
- San Vito di Fagagna, province of Udine
- San Vito di Leguzzano, province of Vicenza
- San Vito Lo Capo, province of Trapani
- San Vito Romano, province of Rome
- San Vito sullo Ionio, province of Catanzaro
- San Vito, Alcamo, a former hamlet now part of Alcamo, Sicily

=== Other places ===
- San Vito, Costa Rica, capital city of the canton Coto Brus, Puntarenas Province, Costa Rica
  - San Vito de Java Airport
- San Vito in Pasquirolo, Milan, church in Milan
- Stadio San Vito, multi-use stadium in Cosenza, Italy

== Other ==
- San Vito (album), a 2024 album by British band The Feeling
