= La Roda de Andalucía =

- Municipality
- Flag Coat of arms

- Location in Spain
- Coordinates: 37°12′38″N 4°46′13″W
- Country: Spain
- Autonomous community: Andalusia
- Province: Sevilla
- Comarca: Estepa

Government
  - Alcaldesa: Milagros Prieto Prieto (PSOE)

Area
  - Total: 76.68 km^{2} (29.61 sq mi)
- Elevation: 405 m (1,329 ft)

Population (2025-01-01)
  - Total: 4,168
  - Density: 54.36/km^{2} (140.8/sq mi)
- Demonym: Rodense/ Rodeños
- Time zone: UTC+1 (CET)
  - Summer (DST): UTC+2 (CEST)
- Postal code: 41590
- Website: Official website

La Roda de Andalucía is a municipality of the Province of Seville, Andalusia, Spain. In 2005 it had a population of 4,322 inhabitants and an area of 320 square kilometres (124 sq mi). The density is 56.1 ihhab/km^{2}. It is located at an altitude of 405 metres (1,329 ft) and is 123 kilometres (76 miles) from Seville (city).

== History ==
Historians recorded events in the area dating back to ancient Roman times, where battering rams and utensils have been found dating back to the civil war between Julius Caesar and Pompey that were used during the Battle of Munda. With the Christian reconquest of Ferdinand III of Castile, the border town became the Nazari Kingdom of Granada. La Roda, as the whole region of Estepa after the Reconquest, became the domains of the Order of Santiago. In 1559 Philip II of Spain established the Marquess of Estepa, to which the town belongs until the early nineteenth century. It is in this century that it undergoes a significant change with the arrival of the railroad (lines Córdoba-Málaga and La Roda-Utrera). Since 1916 La Roda is called "DE ANDALUCIA" to distinguish it from other La Rodas in Spain.

== International relations ==
=== Twin towns — Sister cities ===
La Roda de Andalucía is twinned with:

- Castel Madama, Italy, since 2002

== See also ==
- List of municipalities in Seville
