= Anticoli Corrado =

- Comune
- Comune di Anticoli Corrado
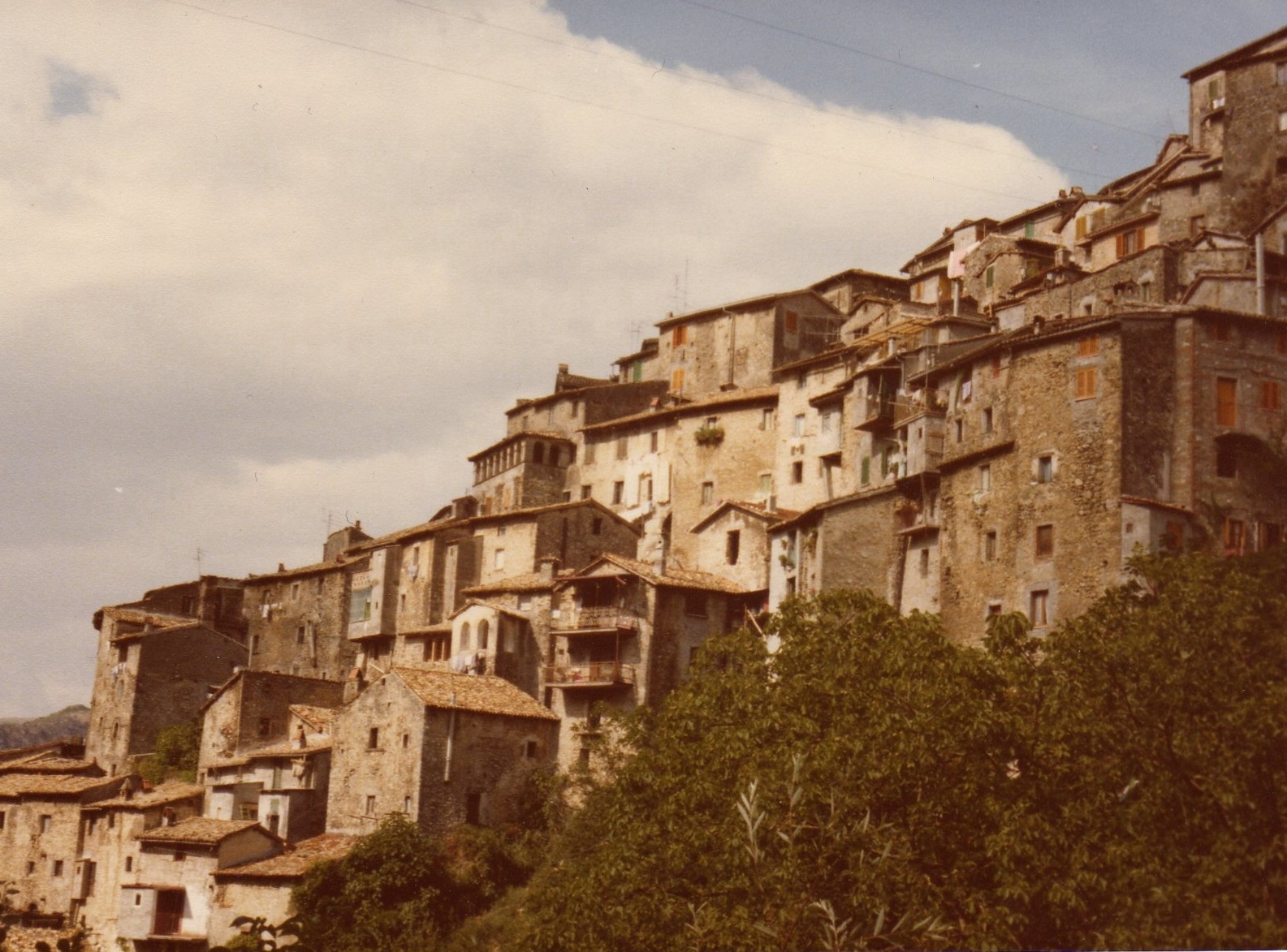
- View of Anticoli Corrado

- Coat of arms

- Location of Anticoli Corrado in Italy Anticoli Corrado (Lazio)
- Coordinates: 42°1′N 12°59′E
- Country: Italy
- Region: Lazio
- Metropolitan city: Rome (RM)

Government
  - Mayor: Francesco De Angelis

Area
  - Total: 16.22 km^{2} (6.26 sq mi)
- Elevation: 508 m (1,667 ft)

Population (31 August 2021)
  - Total: 820
  - Density: 51/km^{2} (130/sq mi)
- Demonym: Anticolani
- Time zone: UTC+1 (CET)
  - Summer (DST): UTC+2 (CEST)
- Postal code: 00022
- Dialing code: 0774
- Patron saint: Santa Vittoria
- Saint day: December 23

Anticoli Corrado (Romanesco: Anticuri) is a comune (municipality) in the Metropolitan City of Rome in the Italian region of Latium, located about 40 kilometres (25 mi) northeast of Rome.

Anticoli Corrado borders the following municipalities: Mandela, Marano Equo, Rocca Canterano, Roviano, Saracinesco.

Historical site, ruins of the castle of Conrad of Antiochia, also called Anticoli or Anticolia fief, a shelter place for Conrad to reside during the years 1282–86, at the start of the War of the Vespers. These ruins are part of the castle holdings of the Malaspina family, built in the 10th century and borrowed by Conrad until his death.

Anticoli became known in the 19th century because its young inhabitants used to pose as models for the community of artists living near Piazza di Spagna in Rome. Some artists eventually went to see the birthplace of their models and found Anticoli a very picturesque site to the point of living there for some time. The town attracted artists until World War II. Artists included Oskar Kokoschka, Henry Inlander, Eric Hebborn, and Noel Paine.

Stanley Kramer's The Secret of Santa Vittoria (1969) was almost entirely shot here.

== Main sights ==
- Church of St. Peter (11th century)
- Palazzo Baronale (17th century)
- Piazza delle Ville, with a fountain by Arturo Martini
- Civic Museum of Modern Art, housing works by artists connected to the town, such as Oskar Kokoschka, Felice Carena, Paolo Salvati, Edita Broglio and Emanuele Cavalli.

== Twin towns ==
- Arcos de la Frontera, Spain
