= Canterano =

- Comune
- Comune di Canterano
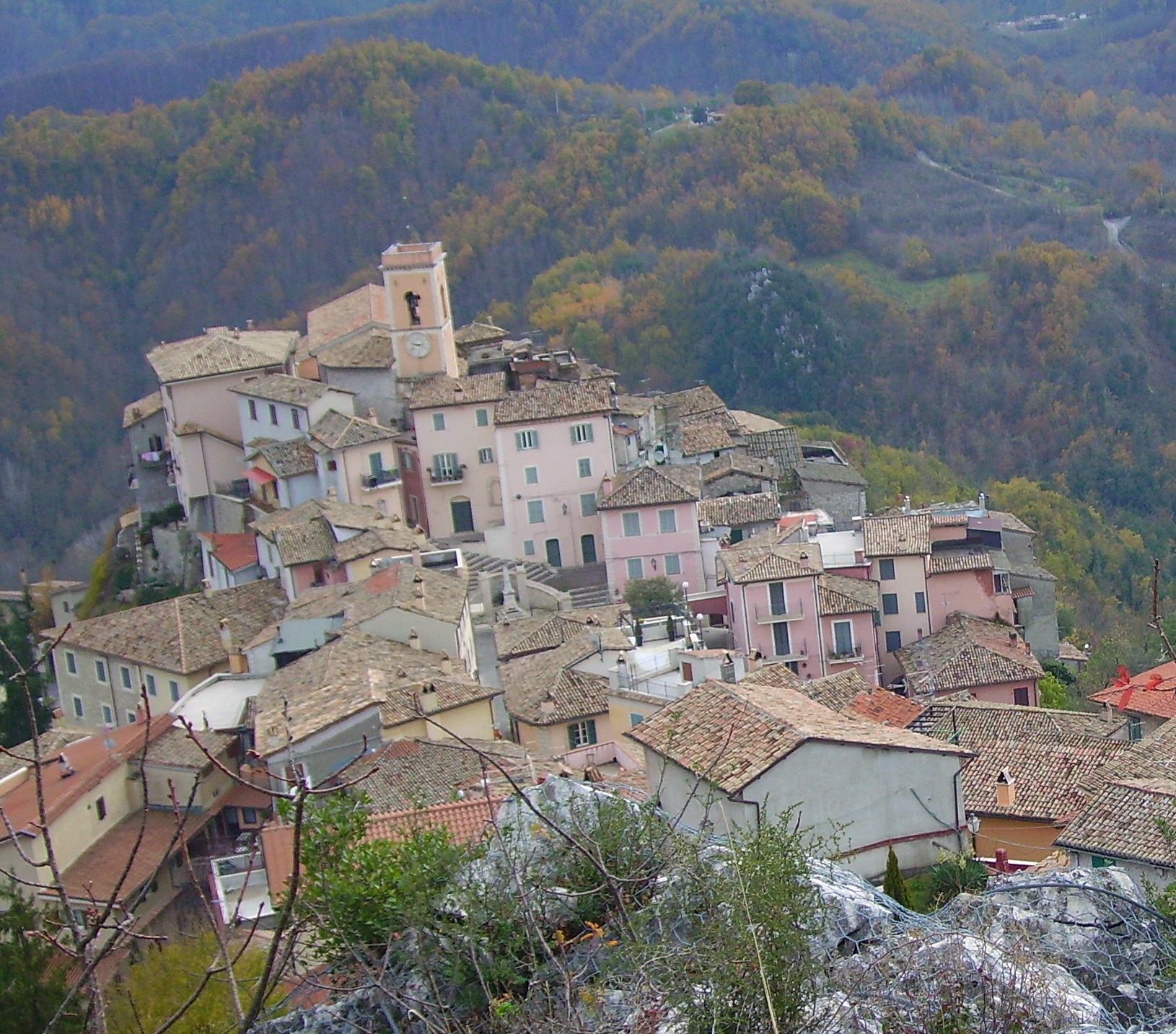
- View of Canterano

- Location within Italy Location within Lazio
- Coordinates: 41°57′N 13°2′E
- Country: Italy
- Region: Lazio
- Metropolitan city: Rome (RM)

Government
  - Mayor: Pierluca Dionisi

Area
  - Total: 7.3 km^{2} (2.8 sq mi)
- Elevation: 602 m (1,975 ft)

Population (31 December 2014)
  - Total: 357
  - Density: 49/km^{2} (130/sq mi)
- Demonym: Canteranesi
- Time zone: UTC+1 (CET)
  - Summer (DST): UTC+2 (CEST)
- Postal code: 00020
- Dialing code: 0774
- Website: Official website

Canterano is a comune (municipality) in the Metropolitan City of Rome in the Italian region of Latium, located about 45 kilometres (28 mi) east of Rome.

Canterano borders the following municipalities: Agosta, Gerano, Rocca Canterano, Rocca Santo Stefano, Subiaco.
