= Henry Inlander =

Austrian-British painter (1925–1983)

- Born: Heinz Kurt Inlander; January 14, 1925; Vienna, Austria
- Died: January 1, 1983 (aged 57)
- Education: Saint Martin's School of Art, Camberwell College of Arts, Slade School of Fine Art
- Occupation: Painter
- Known for: Landscapes, portraits
- Awards: Prix de Rome (1952), Premio Acitrezza (1958), Commonwealth Fellowship (1960–61)

Henry Inlander (14 January 1925 in Vienna – 1983) was an Austrian-British painter of landscapes and portraits. He lived in Trieste from 1935 to 1938, then settled in England. In 1947 he obtained British citizenship. Inlander studied at Saint Martin's School of Art from 1939 to 1941, at the Camberwell School of Art from 1945 to 1946, and at the Slade School of Fine Art from 1949 to 1952 under William Coldstream, Rogers, Pasmore and Gowing. Inlander won a Rome Scholarship (to The British School at Rome) in 1952 and premiered a one-man exhibition at the Galleria La Tartaruga in Rome in 1953. Inlander's first exhibition in London was at the Leicester Galleries in 1956. Inlander also won the Premio Acitrezza in 1958 and was awarded the Harkness Commonwealth Fellowship to the United States from 1960 to 1961. "To live within the landscape is of importance to me; not that I would set up an easel in it but simply the daily contact would further my understanding."

Inlander's work appears in several public and private collections, including the Tate, London.
