= Riofreddo =

- Comune
- Comune di Riofreddo
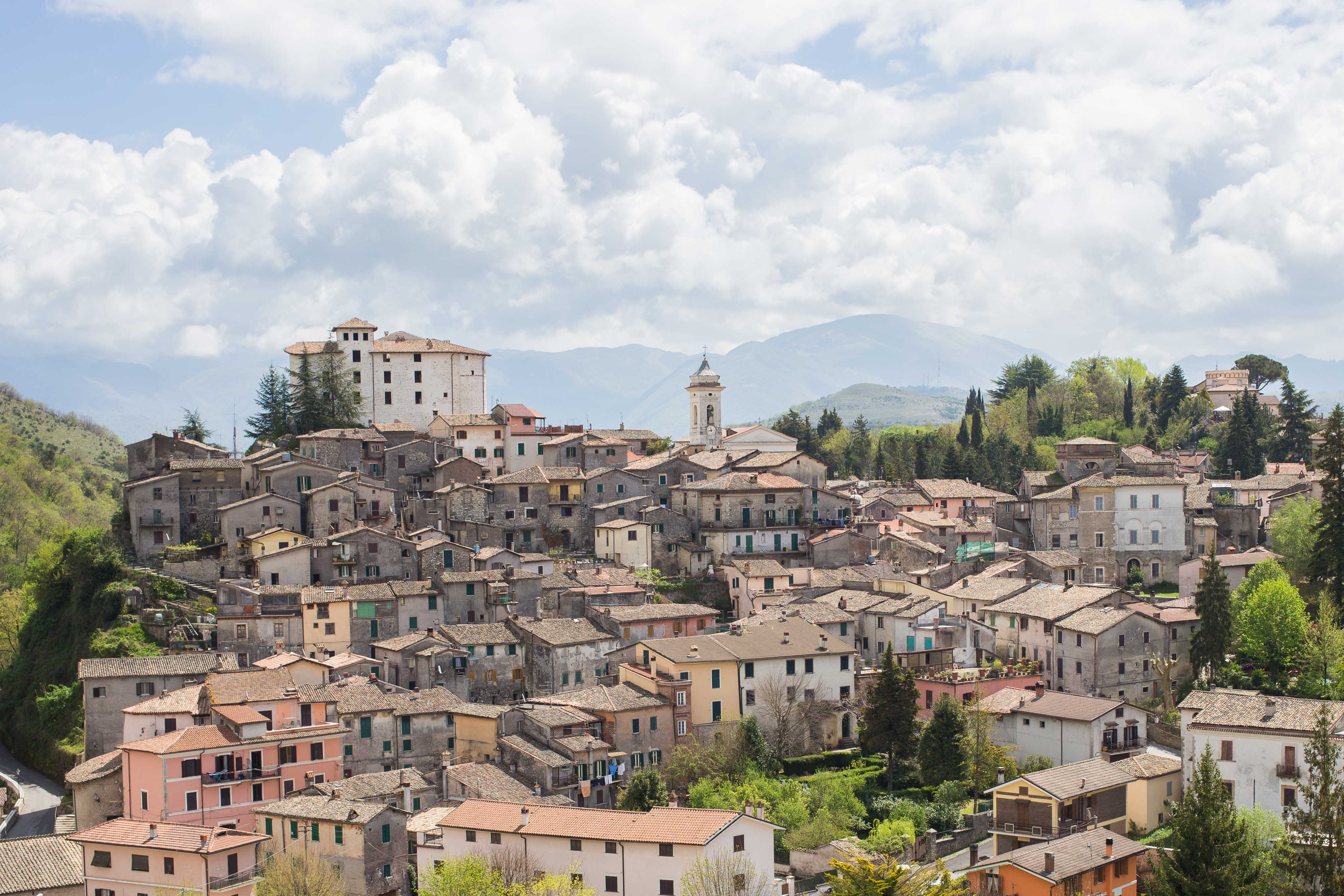
- View of Riofreddo in 2015

- Coat of arms

- Location within Italy Location within Lazio
- Coordinates: 42°4′N 12°59′E
- Country: Italy
- Region: Lazio
- Metropolitan city: Rome (RM)

Government
  - Mayor: Giorgio Caffari

Area
  - Total: 12.5 km^{2} (4.8 sq mi)
- Elevation: 705 m (2,313 ft)

Population (2008)
  - Total: 868
  - Density: 69.4/km^{2} (180/sq mi)
- Demonym: Riofreddani
- Time zone: UTC+1 (CET)
  - Summer (DST): UTC+2 (CEST)
- Postal code: 00020
- Dialing code: 0774
- Website: Official website

Riofreddo is a comune (municipality) in the Metropolitan City of Rome in the Italian region Lazio, located about 45 kilometres (28 mi) northeast of Rome. The name is derived from the Latin "Rivus frigidus," meaning "cold river" or "cold stream."

It was an ancient Roman fortress guarding the ancient Via Valeria of which a few sections remain with the typical Roman paving and a bridge attributed to the Emperor Nerva. It also preserves three necropolises, the most interesting and oldest dating to 1000 BC.

Riofreddo borders the following municipalities: Arsoli, Cineto Romano, Oricola, Roviano, Vallinfreda.

The Oratorio della Santissima Annunziata contains early 15th-century frescoes.
