= Percile =

- Comune
- Comune di Percile
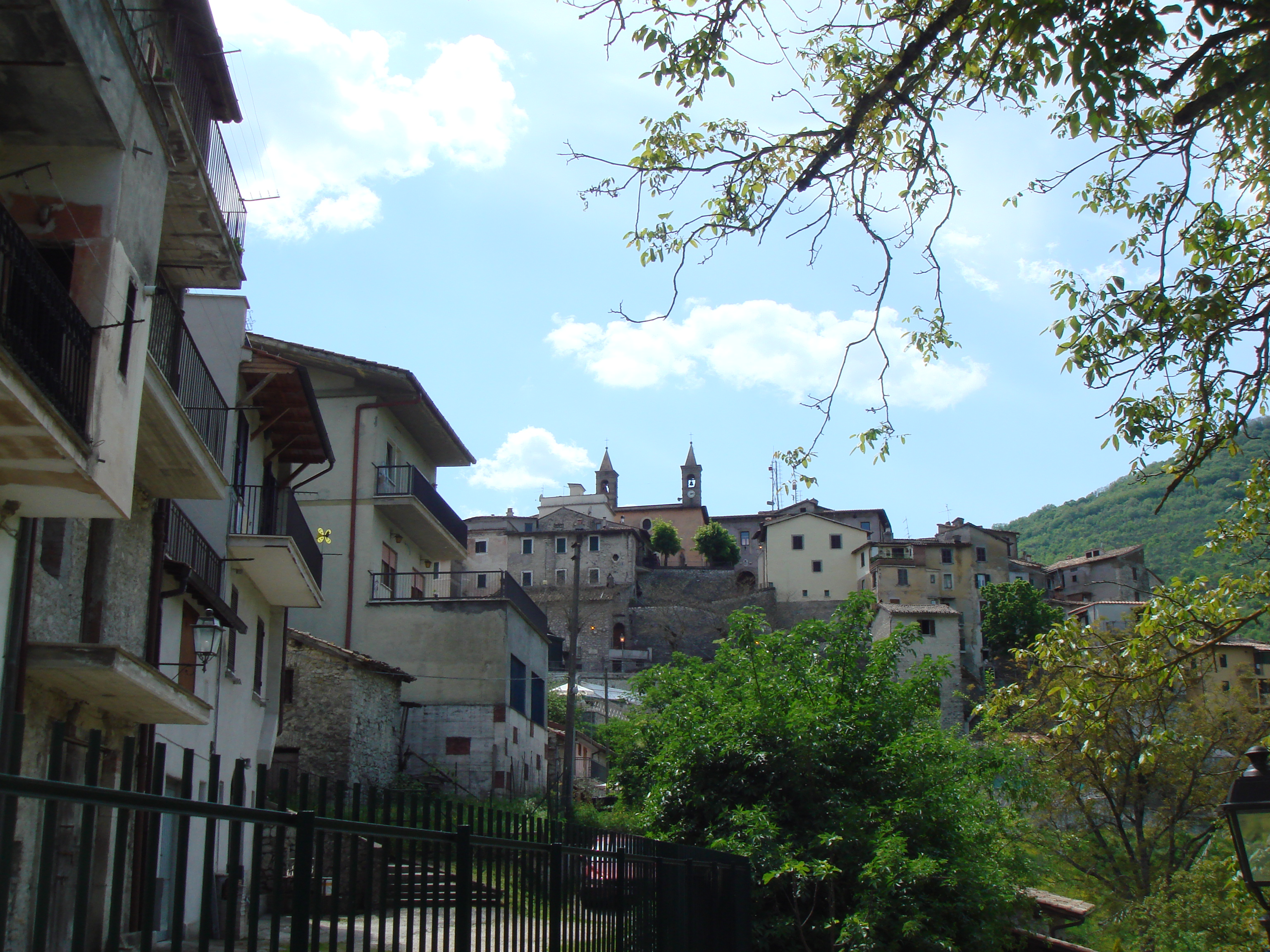
- View of Percile

- Location within Italy Location within Lazio
- Coordinates: 42°6′N 12°55′E
- Country: Italy
- Region: Lazio
- Metropolitan city: Rome (RM)

Government
  - Mayor: Claudio Giustini

Area
  - Total: 17.76 km^{2} (6.86 sq mi)
- Elevation: 575 m (1,886 ft)

Population (30 November 2016)
  - Total: 241
  - Density: 13.6/km^{2} (35.1/sq mi)
- Demonym: Percilesi
- Time zone: UTC+1 (CET)
  - Summer (DST): UTC+2 (CEST)
- Postal code: 00020
- Dialing code: 0774
- Website: Official website

Percile is a comune (municipality) in the Metropolitan City of Rome in the Italian region of Latium, located about 40 kilometres (25 mi) northeast of Rome. It is one of I Borghi più belli d'Italia ("The most beautiful villages of Italy").
