= Monti Prenestini =

Italian geographical and historical region

Coordinates: 41°54′43″N 12°55′44″E

Monte Prenestini
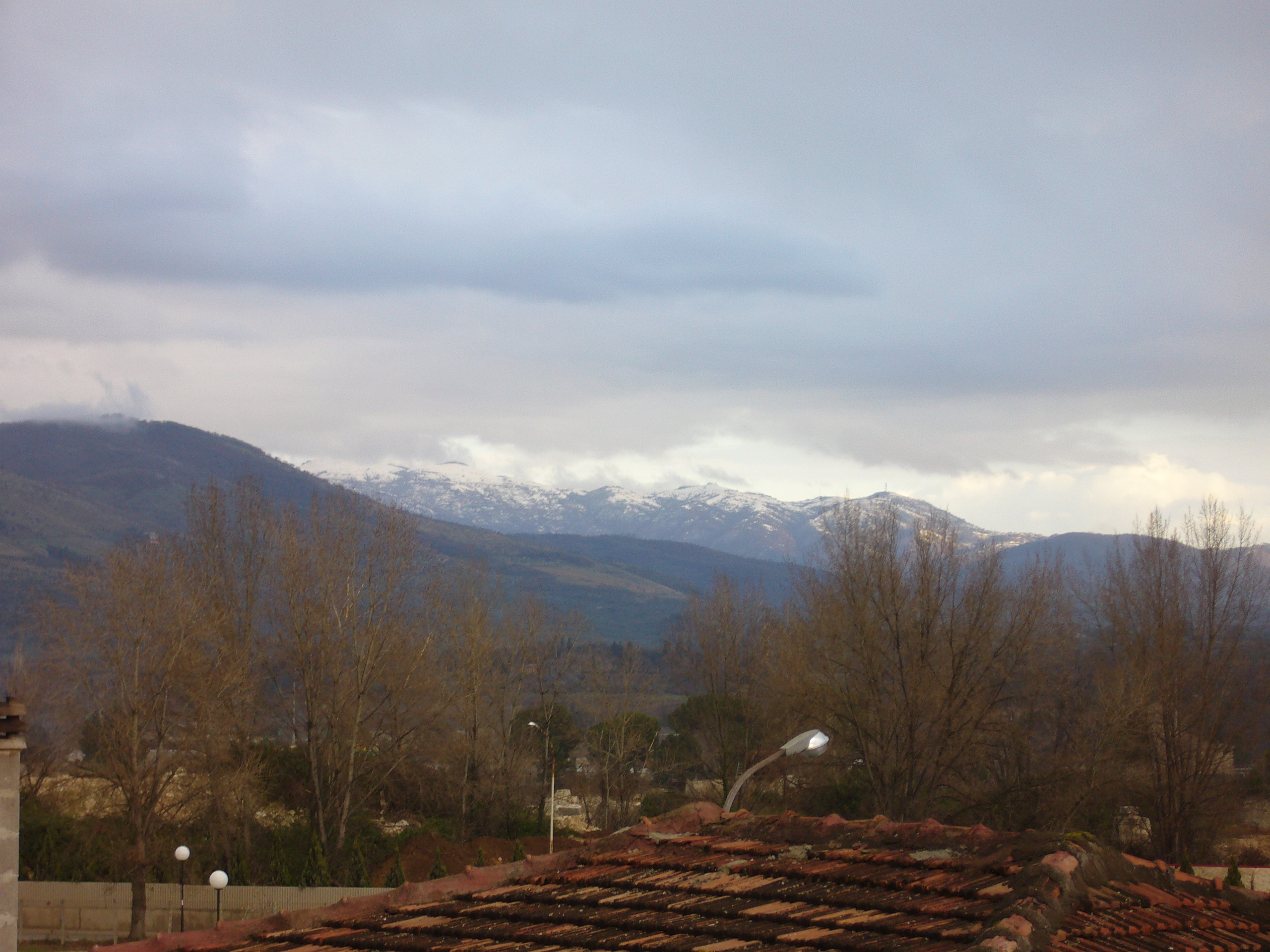
- the Monti Prenestini (facing Northeast) view from Villalba of Guidonia Montecelio

Highest point
- Peak: Monte Guadagnolo
- Elevation: 1,218 m (3,996 ft)

Geography
- Country: Italy
- Region: Lazio

The Monti Prenestini is a mountain range in the Lazio sub-Apennines, in central Italy to the east of Rome. It is of limestone formation. It is bounded by the Monti Tiburtini to the north, by the Monti Ruffi to the east, and by the valley of the river Sacco to the south. The highest peak is Monte Guadagnolo (1,218 m), in the comune of Capranica Prenestina.
