= Castel Madama =

- Comune
- Comune di Castel Madama
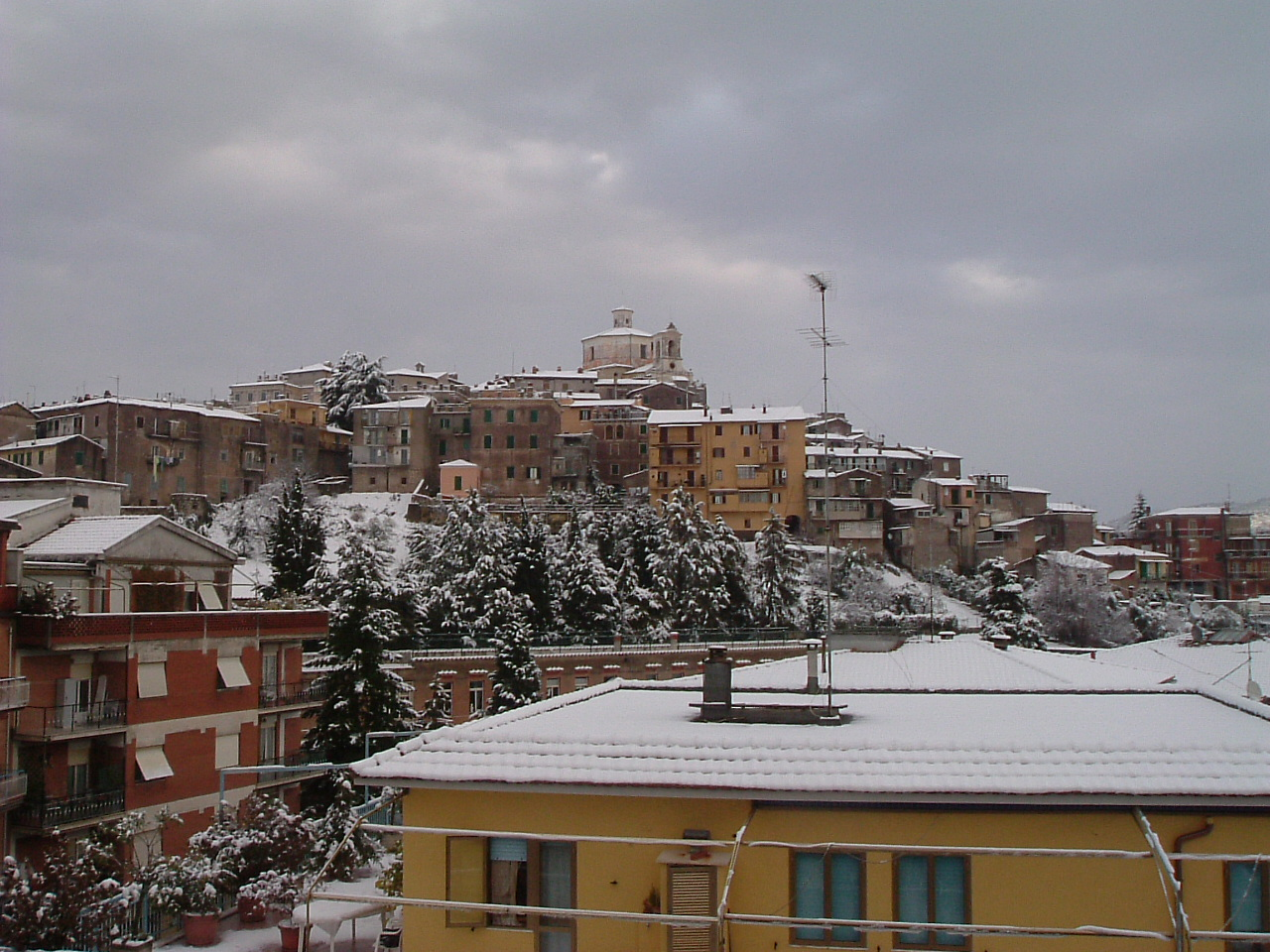
- View of Castel Madama

- Coat of arms

- Location within Italy Location within Lazio
- Coordinates: 41°58′N 12°52′E
- Country: Italy
- Region: Lazio
- Metropolitan city: Rome (RM)
- Frazioni: Colle Passero, Monitola, La Valle, Valle Caprara

Government
  - Mayor: Michele Nonni

Area
  - Total: 28.5 km^{2} (11.0 sq mi)
- Elevation: 428 m (1,404 ft)

Population (30 November 2016)
  - Total: 7,422
  - Density: 260/km^{2} (674/sq mi)
- Demonym: Castellani
- Time zone: UTC+1 (CET)
  - Summer (DST): UTC+2 (CEST)
- Postal code: 00024
- Dialing code: 0774
- Patron saint: St. Michael Archangel
- Saint day: May 9 and September 29
- Website: Official website

Castel Madama is a comune (municipality) in the Metropolitan City of Rome in the Italian region of Lazio, located about 30 kilometres (19 miles) east of Rome.

== International relations ==
Castel Madama is twinned with:

- Oudenaarde, Belgium, since 1986
- La Roda de Andalucía, Spain, since 2002
