= Sambuci =

- Comune
- Comune di Sambuci
- Location within Italy Location within Lazio
- Coordinates: 41°59′N 12°56′E
- Country: Italy
- Region: Lazio
- Metropolitan city: Rome (RM)

Government
  - Mayor: Dario Ronchetti

Area
  - Total: 8.23 km^{2} (3.18 sq mi)
- Elevation: 434 m (1,424 ft)

Population (30 November 2016)
  - Total: 909
  - Density: 110/km^{2} (286/sq mi)
- Demonym: Sambuciani
- Time zone: UTC+1 (CET)
  - Summer (DST): UTC+2 (CEST)
- Postal code: 00020
- Dialing code: 0774
- Website: Official website

Sambuci is a comune (municipality) in the Metropolitan City of Rome in the Italian region of Latium, located about 35 kilometres (22 mi) east of Rome.
