= Cineto Romano =

- Comune
- Comune di Cineto Romano
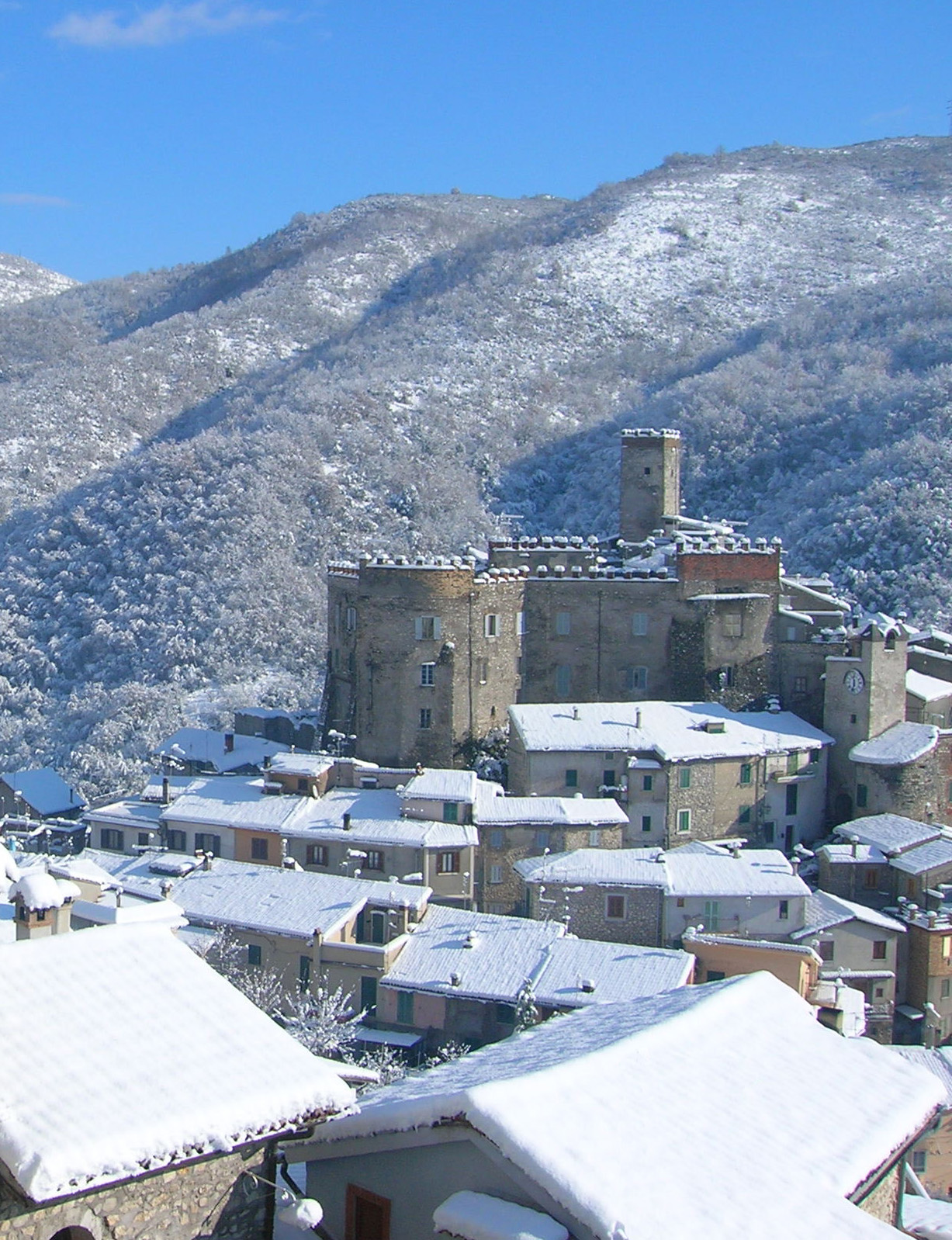
- View of Cineto Romano

- Coat of arms

- Location within Italy Location within Lazio
- Coordinates: 42°3′N 12°58′E
- Country: Italy
- Region: Lazio
- Metropolitan city: Rome (RM)

Government
  - Mayor: Amedeo Latini

Area
  - Total: 10.5 km^{2} (4.1 sq mi)
- Elevation: 519 m (1,703 ft)

Population (31 December 2010)
  - Total: 668
  - Density: 63.6/km^{2} (165/sq mi)
- Demonym: Cinetesi
- Time zone: UTC+1 (CET)
  - Summer (DST): UTC+2 (CEST)
- Postal code: 00020
- Dialing code: 0774
- Patron saint: St. John the Baptist
- Saint day: 29 August
- Website: Official website

Cineto Romano is a comune (municipality) in the Metropolitan City of Rome in the Italian region of Latium, located about 40 kilometres (25 mi) northeast of Rome. It was named Scarpe until 1882.

It was a fief of the Orsini in the 11th century, then of the Borghese. Main sights include the baronial Castle and the church of San Giovanni Battista (13th century).
