= Marano Equo =

- Comune
- Comune di Marano Equo
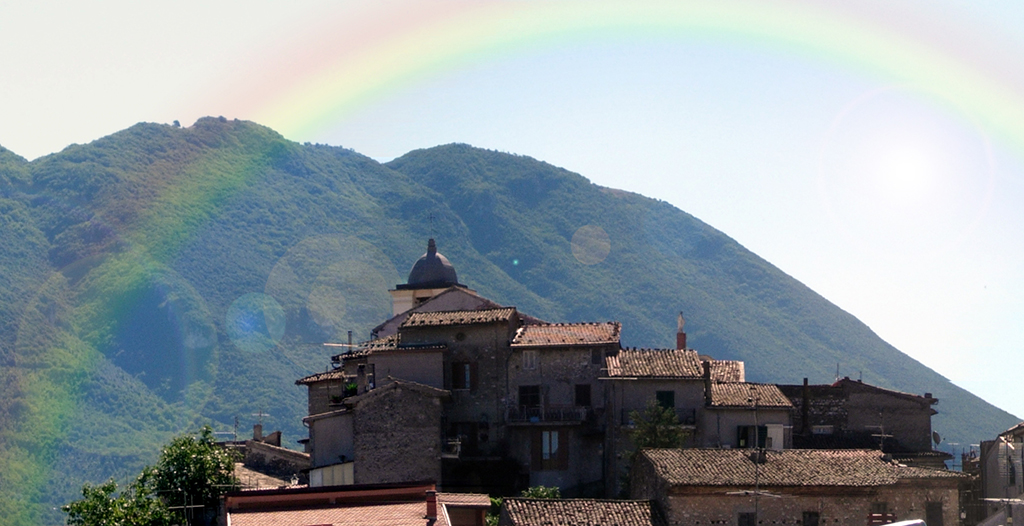
- View of Marano Equo

- Coat of arms

- Location within Italy Location within Lazio
- Coordinates: 42°0′N 13°1′E
- Country: Italy
- Region: Lazio
- Metropolitan city: Rome (RM)

Government
  - Mayor: Claudio Maglioni

Area
  - Total: 7.6 km^{2} (2.9 sq mi)
- Elevation: 450 m (1,480 ft)

Population (30 September 2017)
  - Total: 780
  - Density: 100/km^{2} (270/sq mi)
- Demonym: Maranesi
- Time zone: UTC+1 (CET)
  - Summer (DST): UTC+2 (CEST)
- Postal code: 00020
- Dialing code: 0774
- Patron saint: St. Blaise
- Saint day: 3 February
- Website: Official website

Marano Equo is a comune (municipality) in the Metropolitan City of Rome in the Italian region of Latium, located about 45 kilometres (28 mi) east of Rome. It stands on a steep slope descending to the Aniene valley with the Monti Simbruini located nearby.
