= Cerreto Laziale =

- Comune
- Comune di Cerreto Laziale
- Coat of arms

- Location within Italy Location within Lazio
- Coordinates: 41°57′N 12°59′E
- Country: Italy
- Region: Lazio
- Metropolitan city: Rome

Government
  - Mayor: Gina Panci

Area
  - Total: 12.08 km^{2} (4.66 sq mi)
- Elevation: 520 m (1,710 ft)

Population (30 June 2017)
  - Total: 1,118
  - Density: 92.55/km^{2} (239.7/sq mi)
- Demonym: Cerretani
- Time zone: UTC+1 (CET)
  - Summer (DST): UTC+2 (CEST)
- Postal code: 00020
- Dialing code: 0774
- Website: Official website

Cerreto Laziale is a comune (municipality) in the Metropolitan City of Rome in the Italian region of Latium, located about 40 kilometres (25 mi) east of Rome.

== Origins of the name ==
According to some, the name of the town refers to Mount “Cerretum”, near which the town is located. According to others, it derives from the Latin “Quercus cerris”, ie Turkey oak (since, previously, the territory where the town now stands was covered with Turkey oaks) with the addition of the collective suffix “-etum” which indicates abundance.
