= Gerano =

- Comune
- Comune di Gerano
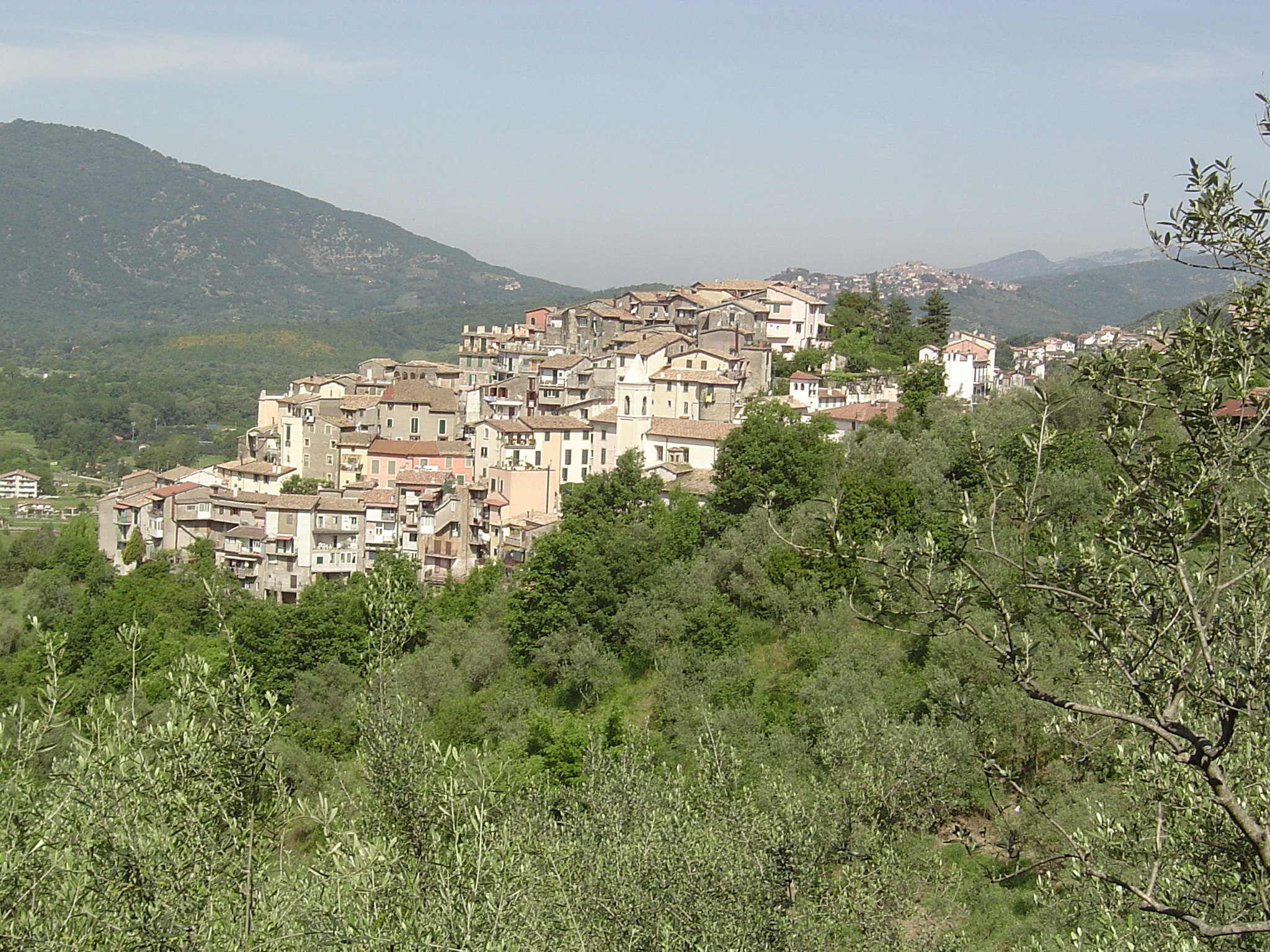
- View of Gerano

- Coat of arms

- Location within Italy Location within Lazio
- Coordinates: 41°56′N 12°59′E
- Country: Italy
- Region: Lazio
- Metropolitan city: Rome (RM)

Government
  - Mayor: Danilo Felici

Area
  - Total: 10.09 km^{2} (3.90 sq mi)
- Elevation: 502 m (1,647 ft)

Population (31 December 2019)
  - Total: 1,259
  - Density: 124.8/km^{2} (323.2/sq mi)
- Demonym: Geranesi
- Time zone: UTC+1 (CET)
  - Summer (DST): UTC+2 (CEST)
- Postal code: 00025
- Dialing code: 0774
- Website: Official website

Gerano is a comune (municipality) in the Metropolitan City of Rome in the Italian region of Latium, located about 40 kilometres (25 miles) east of Rome.

== History ==
The year of foundation of Gerano is unknown; however, it is known that in 1005 it constituted a castrum. In the Middle Ages, due to its strategic and economic importance, as the capital of Massa Giovenzana (replacing the more ancient Trellanum), for a while, Pope Gregory VII was interested in it, who in 1077 confirmed Gerano to be divided between the diocese of Tivoli and the abbot of Subiaco.
