= Capranica Prenestina =

- Comune
- Comune di Capranica Prenestina
- Coat of arms

- Location within Italy Location within Lazio
- Coordinates: 41°52′N 12°57′E
- Country: Italy
- Region: Lazio
- Metropolitan city: Rome (RM)
- Frazioni: Guadagnolo

Government
  - Mayor: Francesco Colagrossi

Area
  - Total: 20.36 km^{2} (7.86 sq mi)
- Elevation: 915 m (3,002 ft)

Population (31 May 2017)
  - Total: 343
  - Density: 16.8/km^{2} (43.6/sq mi)
- Demonym: Capranicensi
- Time zone: UTC+1 (CET)
  - Summer (DST): UTC+2 (CEST)
- Postal code: 00030
- Dialing code: 06
- Patron saint: St. Roch
- Saint day: August 16
- Website: Official website

Capranica Prenestina is a comune (municipality) in the Metropolitan City of Rome in the Italian region Lazio, located about 40 kilometres (25 mi) east of Rome.

It is located in the Monti Prenestini area.
