= Bellegra =

- Comune
- Comune di Bellegra
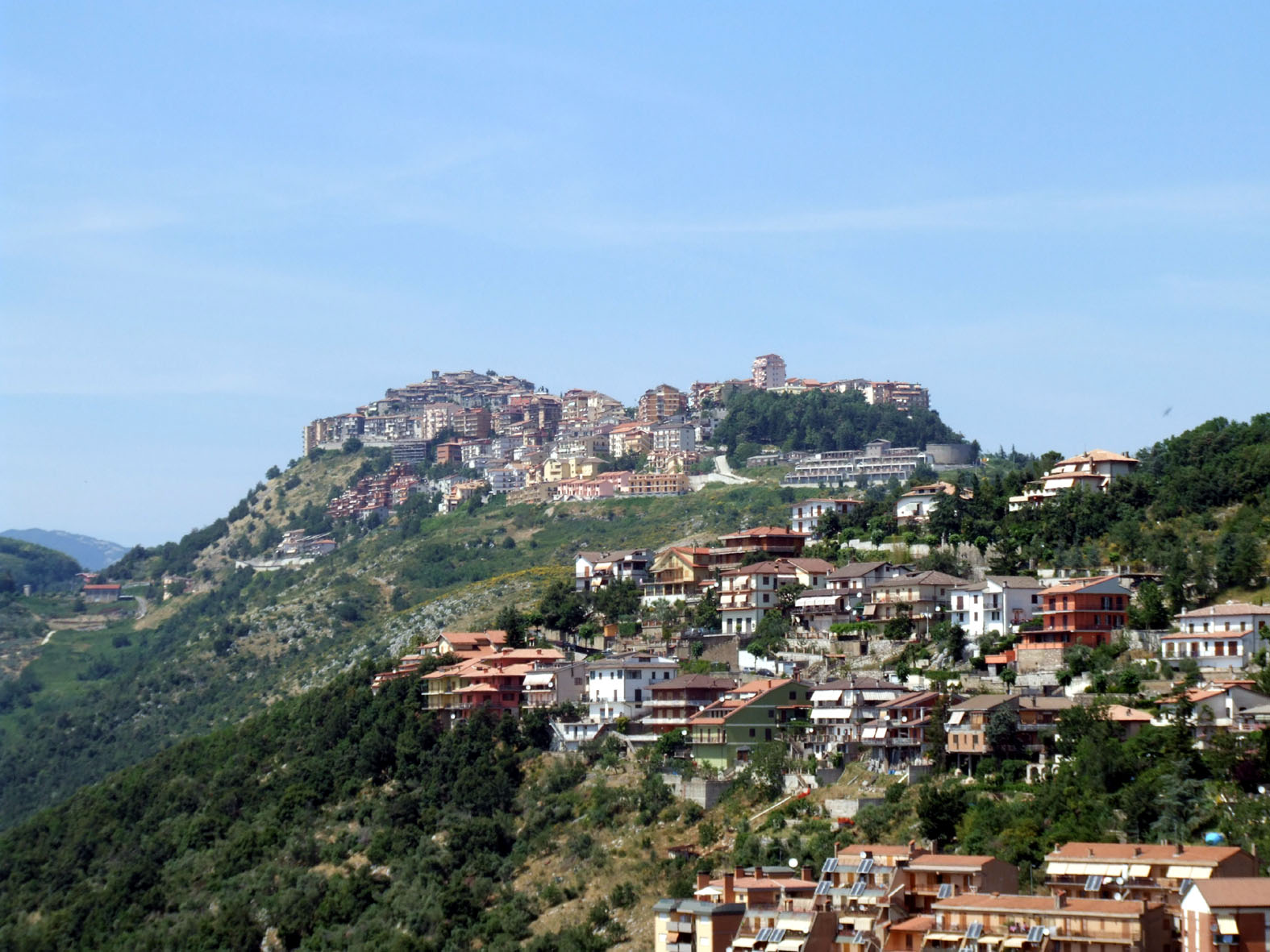
- Bellegra seen from Olevano Romano

- Coat of arms

- Location within Italy Location within Lazio
- Coordinates: 41°53′N 13°02′E
- Country: Italy
- Region: Lazio
- Metropolitan city: Rome (RM)
- Frazioni: Vaccarecce, Vadocanale, Fontanafresca

Government
  - Mayor: Flavio Cera

Area
  - Total: 18.78 km^{2} (7.25 sq mi)
- Elevation: 815 m (2,674 ft)

Population (30 April 2017)
  - Total: 2,839
  - Density: 151.2/km^{2} (391.5/sq mi)
- Demonym: Bellegrani
- Time zone: UTC+1 (CET)
  - Summer (DST): UTC+2 (CEST)
- Postal code: 00030
- Dialing code: 06
- Patron saint: Pope Sixtus II
- Saint day: August 6
- Website: Official website

Bellegra is a town and comune in the Metropolitan City of Rome, in the Lazio region of central Italy.

Its original name since 11 January 967 had been Civitella (Latin: Civitas Vitellia). The town council changed that name to its current one on 10 October 1880, out of the belief that the town lay on the site of an ancient town called Belecre, possibly from the Latin bella aegra (blood-stained wars).
