= List of municipalities of Lazio =

Location of Lazio within Italy

Provinces of Lazio

The following is a list of the municipalities (comuni) of the region of Lazio in Italy.

There are 378 municipalities in Lazio as of 2026:

- 91 in the Province of Frosinone
- 33 in the Province of Latina
- 73 in the Province of Rieti
- 121 in the Metropolitan City of Rome Capital
- 60 in the Province of Viterbo

== List ==
Municipality	Province	Population (2026)	Area (km^{2})	Density
Accumoli	Rieti	493	87.37	5.6
Acquafondata	Frosinone	253	25.32	10.0
Acquapendente	Viterbo	5,222	131.61	39.7
Acuto	Frosinone	1,779	13.47	132.1
Affile	Rome	1,403	15.11	92.9
Agosta	Rome	1,679	9.50	176.7
Alatri	Frosinone	27,436	96.96	283.0
Albano Laziale	Rome	39,706	23.80	1,668.3
Allumiere	Rome	3,772	92.17	40.9
Alvito	Frosinone	2,434	51.72	47.1
Amaseno	Frosinone	4,029	77.73	51.8
Amatrice	Rieti	2,146	174.40	12.3
Anagni	Frosinone	20,630	112.82	182.9
Anguillara Sabazia	Rome	19,037	75.24	253.0
Anticoli Corrado	Rome	841	16.22	51.8
Antrodoco	Rieti	2,238	63.90	35.0
Anzio	Rome	60,063	43.65	1,376.0
Aprilia	Latina	74,697	178.11	419.4
Aquino	Frosinone	4,898	19.24	254.6
Arce	Frosinone	5,376	39.52	136.0
Arcinazzo Romano	Rome	1,245	28.31	44.0
Ardea	Rome	51,374	72.09	712.6
Ariccia	Rome	17,938	18.59	964.9
Arlena di Castro	Viterbo	791	21.87	36.2
Arnara	Frosinone	2,136	12.29	173.8
Arpino	Frosinone	6,512	56.24	115.8
Arsoli	Rome	1,347	12.20	110.4
Artena	Rome	13,676	54.80	249.6
Ascrea	Rieti	195	13.98	13.9
Atina	Frosinone	4,079	29.89	136.5
Ausonia	Frosinone	2,405	19.64	122.5
Bagnoregio	Viterbo	3,258	72.81	44.7
Barbarano Romano	Viterbo	980	37.56	26.1
Bassano in Teverina	Viterbo	1,272	12.17	104.5
Bassano Romano	Viterbo	4,680	37.55	124.6
Bassiano	Latina	1,432	32.40	44.2
Bellegra	Rome	2,578	18.78	137.3
Belmonte Castello	Frosinone	657	14.05	46.8
Belmonte in Sabina	Rieti	653	23.65	27.6
Blera	Viterbo	2,895	92.92	31.2
Bolsena	Viterbo	3,649	63.57	57.4
Bomarzo	Viterbo	1,695	39.65	42.7
Borbona	Rieti	573	47.96	11.9
Borgo Velino	Rieti	901	18.29	49.3
Borgorose	Rieti	4,210	145.82	28.9
Boville Ernica	Frosinone	8,214	28.19	291.4
Bracciano	Rome	18,349	143.06	128.3
Broccostella	Frosinone	2,609	11.79	221.3
Calcata	Viterbo	905	7.63	118.6
Camerata Nuova	Rome	403	40.50	10.0
Campagnano di Roma	Rome	10,987	46.94	234.1
Campodimele	Latina	545	38.38	14.2
Campoli Appennino	Frosinone	1,596	32.43	49.2
Canale Monterano	Rome	4,164	36.92	112.8
Canepina	Viterbo	2,900	20.85	139.1
Canino	Viterbo	5,029	124.04	40.5
Cantalice	Rieti	2,386	37.62	63.4
Cantalupo in Sabina	Rieti	1,657	10.62	156.0
Canterano	Rome	343	7.37	46.5
Capena	Rome	11,071	29.51	375.2
Capodimonte	Viterbo	1,647	61.29	26.9
Capranica	Viterbo	6,351	40.97	155.0
Capranica Prenestina	Rome	310	20.36	15.2
Caprarola	Viterbo	5,160	57.58	89.6
Carbognano	Viterbo	1,951	17.41	112.1
Carpineto Romano	Rome	3,911	86.29	45.3
Casalattico	Frosinone	515	28.38	18.1
Casalvieri	Frosinone	2,385	27.27	87.5
Casape	Rome	610	5.38	113.4
Casaprota	Rieti	678	14.55	46.6
Casperia	Rieti	1,215	25.31	48.0
Cassino	Frosinone	34,760	83.42	416.7
Castel di Tora	Rieti	271	15.49	17.5
Castel Gandolfo	Rome	8,536	14.19	601.6
Castel Madama	Rome	7,022	28.80	243.8
Castel San Pietro Romano	Rome	838	15.29	54.8
Castel Sant'Angelo	Rieti	1,156	31.27	37.0
Castel Sant'Elia	Viterbo	2,411	23.92	100.8
Castelforte	Latina	4,010	29.71	135.0
Castelliri	Frosinone	3,089	15.32	201.6
Castelnuovo di Farfa	Rieti	987	8.84	111.7
Castelnuovo di Porto	Rome	8,610	30.57	281.6
Castelnuovo Parano	Frosinone	827	9.88	83.7
Castiglione in Teverina	Viterbo	2,289	19.89	115.1
Castro dei Volsci	Frosinone	4,337	58.45	74.2
Castrocielo	Frosinone	3,727	27.92	133.5
Cave	Rome	10,935	17.88	611.6
Ceccano	Frosinone	21,962	61.06	359.7
Celleno	Viterbo	1,315	23.82	55.2
Cellere	Viterbo	1,087	37.20	29.2
Ceprano	Frosinone	7,940	38.03	208.8
Cerreto Laziale	Rome	1,075	12.08	89.0
Cervara di Roma	Rome	453	31.75	14.3
Cervaro	Frosinone	7,708	39.41	195.6
Cerveteri	Rome	38,206	134.32	284.4
Ciampino	Rome	38,913	13.00	2,993.3
Ciciliano	Rome	1,248	18.85	66.2
Cineto Romano	Rome	579	10.37	55.8
Cisterna di Latina	Latina	36,255	144.16	251.5
Cittaducale	Rieti	6,400	71.25	89.8
Cittareale	Rieti	374	59.67	6.3
Civita Castellana	Viterbo	15,011	84.22	178.2
Civitavecchia	Rome	51,359	73.74	696.5
Civitella d'Agliano	Viterbo	1,444	32.96	43.8
Civitella San Paolo	Rome	2,046	20.75	98.6
Colfelice	Frosinone	1,747	14.52	120.3
Collalto Sabino	Rieti	369	22.37	16.5
Colle di Tora	Rieti	348	14.37	24.2
Colle San Magno	Frosinone	603	44.99	13.4
Colleferro	Rome	20,381	26.99	755.1
Collegiove	Rieti	133	10.61	12.5
Collepardo	Frosinone	855	24.68	34.6
Collevecchio	Rieti	1,575	26.95	58.4
Colli sul Velino	Rieti	465	12.76	36.4
Colonna	Rome	4,226	3.55	1,190.4
Concerviano	Rieti	282	21.39	13.2
Configni	Rieti	556	22.93	24.2
Contigliano	Rieti	3,657	53.55	68.3
Corchiano	Viterbo	3,531	33.03	106.9
Coreno Ausonio	Frosinone	1,464	26.38	55.5
Cori	Latina	10,465	85.31	122.7
Cottanello	Rieti	517	36.70	14.1
Esperia	Frosinone	3,545	108.57	32.7
Fabrica di Roma	Viterbo	8,167	34.79	234.8
Faleria	Viterbo	2,024	25.68	78.8
Falvaterra	Frosinone	503	12.73	39.5
Fara in Sabina	Rieti	13,968	54.96	254.1
Farnese	Viterbo	1,337	52.38	25.5
Ferentino	Frosinone	19,902	81.00	245.7
Fiamignano	Rieti	1,151	100.62	11.4
Fiano Romano	Rome	16,893	41.19	410.1
Filacciano	Rome	481	5.66	85.0
Filettino	Frosinone	533	78.08	6.8
Fiuggi	Frosinone	10,180	32.98	308.7
Fiumicino	Rome	83,415	213.89	390.0
Fondi	Latina	40,310	143.92	280.1
Fontana Liri	Frosinone	2,589	16.11	160.7
Fonte Nuova	Rome	32,787	19.94	1,644.3
Fontechiari	Frosinone	1,191	16.15	73.7
Forano	Rieti	3,230	17.69	182.6
Formello	Rome	13,925	31.15	447.0
Formia	Latina	36,775	74.17	495.8
Frascati	Rome	22,948	22.48	1,020.8
Frasso Sabino	Rieti	733	4.39	167.0
Frosinone	Frosinone	42,836	46.85	914.3
Fumone	Frosinone	1,929	14.84	130.0
Gaeta	Latina	18,908	29.20	647.5
Gallese	Viterbo	2,551	37.17	68.6
Gallicano nel Lazio	Rome	6,578	25.70	256.0
Gallinaro	Frosinone	1,164	17.74	65.6
Gavignano	Rome	1,854	15.04	123.3
Genazzano	Rome	5,737	32.07	178.9
Genzano di Roma	Rome	22,329	17.90	1,247.4
Gerano	Rome	1,110	10.12	109.7
Giuliano di Roma	Frosinone	2,310	33.54	68.9
Gorga	Rome	649	26.19	24.8
Gradoli	Viterbo	1,220	43.81	27.8
Graffignano	Viterbo	2,058	29.10	70.7
Greccio	Rieti	1,448	17.86	81.1
Grottaferrata	Rome	20,345	18.40	1,105.7
Grotte di Castro	Viterbo	2,374	33.42	71.0
Guarcino	Frosinone	1,488	40.37	36.9
Guidonia Montecelio	Rome	89,420	79.47	1,125.2
Ischia di Castro	Viterbo	2,107	104.95	20.1
Isola del Liri	Frosinone	10,517	16.01	656.9
Itri	Latina	10,579	101.10	104.6
Jenne	Rome	324	31.45	10.3
Labico	Rome	6,409	11.75	545.4
Labro	Rieti	342	11.75	29.1
Ladispoli	Rome	40,968	25.95	1,578.7
Lanuvio	Rome	12,897	43.76	294.7
Lariano	Rome	13,297	22.53	590.2
Latera	Viterbo	772	22.43	34.4
Latina	Latina	127,450	277.62	459.1
Lenola	Latina	4,095	45.24	90.5
Leonessa	Rieti	2,019	204.04	9.9
Licenza	Rome	988	17.99	54.9
Longone Sabino	Rieti	510	34.33	14.9
Lubriano	Viterbo	841	16.69	50.4
Maenza	Latina	2,956	42.13	70.2
Magliano Romano	Rome	1,379	20.52	67.2
Magliano Sabina	Rieti	3,457	43.23	80.0
Mandela	Rome	931	13.72	67.9
Manziana	Rome	7,838	24.00	326.6
Marano Equo	Rome	757	7.65	99.0
Marcellina	Rome	7,160	15.36	466.1
Marcetelli	Rieti	53	11.08	4.8
Marino	Rome	46,667	24.19	1,929.2
Marta	Viterbo	3,211	33.54	95.7
Mazzano Romano	Rome	2,935	29.07	101.0
Mentana	Rome	22,615	24.27	931.8
Micigliano	Rieti	119	36.85	3.2
Minturno	Latina	20,400	42.14	484.1
Mompeo	Rieti	504	10.89	46.3
Montalto di Castro	Viterbo	8,679	189.63	45.8
Montasola	Rieti	398	12.75	31.2
Monte Compatri	Rome	11,633	24.57	473.5
Monte Porzio Catone	Rome	8,597	9.13	941.6
Monte Romano	Viterbo	1,847	86.14	21.4
Monte San Biagio	Latina	6,028	65.10	92.6
Monte San Giovanni Campano	Frosinone	11,794	48.71	242.1
Monte San Giovanni in Sabina	Rieti	664	30.76	21.6
Montebuono	Rieti	844	19.73	42.8
Montefiascone	Viterbo	12,979	104.93	123.7
Monteflavio	Rome	1,150	16.84	68.3
Montelanico	Rome	2,003	35.14	57.0
Monteleone Sabino	Rieti	1,128	19.04	59.2
Montelibretti	Rome	5,098	45.43	112.2
Montenero Sabino	Rieti	268	22.59	11.9
Monterosi	Viterbo	4,789	10.68	448.4
Monterotondo	Rome	41,185	40.94	1,006.0
Montopoli di Sabina	Rieti	4,109	37.94	108.3
Montorio Romano	Rome	1,908	23.39	81.6
Moricone	Rome	2,373	19.59	121.1
Morlupo	Rome	8,553	24.08	355.2
Morolo	Frosinone	3,114	26.57	117.2
Morro Reatino	Rieti	334	15.74	21.2
Nazzano	Rome	1,298	12.40	104.7
Nemi	Rome	1,854	7.33	252.9
Nepi	Viterbo	9,550	83.71	114.1
Nerola	Rome	1,961	17.10	114.7
Nespolo	Rieti	207	8.65	23.9
Nettuno	Rome	48,111	71.64	671.6
Norma	Latina	3,723	31.22	119.3
Olevano Romano	Rome	6,292	26.16	240.5
Onano	Viterbo	865	24.51	35.3
Oriolo Romano	Viterbo	3,673	19.31	190.2
Orte	Viterbo	9,243	69.56	132.9
Orvinio	Rieti	379	24.69	15.4
Paganico Sabino	Rieti	155	9.31	16.6
Palestrina	Rome	22,110	47.02	470.2
Paliano	Frosinone	7,852	70.64	111.2
Palombara Sabina	Rome	13,157	75.80	173.6
Pastena	Frosinone	1,248	42.16	29.6
Patrica	Frosinone	3,049	27.31	111.6
Percile	Rome	213	17.76	12.0
Pescorocchiano	Rieti	1,797	94.78	19.0
Pescosolido	Frosinone	1,372	44.90	30.6
Petrella Salto	Rieti	1,014	102.93	9.9
Piansano	Viterbo	2,039	26.61	76.6
Picinisco	Frosinone	1,106	62.15	17.8
Pico	Frosinone	2,554	32.93	77.6
Piedimonte San Germano	Frosinone	6,326	17.32	365.2
Piglio	Frosinone	4,248	35.38	120.1
Pignataro Interamna	Frosinone	2,374	24.41	97.3
Pisoniano	Rome	711	12.92	55.0
Pofi	Frosinone	3,847	30.68	125.4
Poggio Bustone	Rieti	1,957	22.38	87.4
Poggio Catino	Rieti	1,303	14.98	87.0
Poggio Mirteto	Rieti	6,081	26.40	230.3
Poggio Moiano	Rieti	2,795	26.95	103.7
Poggio Nativo	Rieti	2,582	16.50	156.5
Poggio San Lorenzo	Rieti	563	8.67	64.9
Poli	Rome	2,233	21.75	102.7
Pomezia	Rome	64,970	86.57	750.5
Pontecorvo	Frosinone	12,067	88.80	135.9
Pontinia	Latina	15,084	112.10	134.6
Ponza	Latina	3,295	10.16	324.3
Ponzano Romano	Rome	1,265	19.52	64.8
Posta	Rieti	518	66.01	7.8
Posta Fibreno	Frosinone	1,035	9.80	105.6
Pozzaglia Sabina	Rieti	303	24.98	12.1
Priverno	Latina	13,694	56.98	240.3
Proceno	Viterbo	521	42.02	12.4
Prossedi	Latina	1,112	35.37	31.4
Riano	Rome	10,494	25.43	412.7
Rieti	Rieti	44,866	206.46	217.3
Rignano Flaminio	Rome	10,170	38.56	263.7
Riofreddo	Rome	750	12.38	60.6
Ripi	Frosinone	4,991	31.61	157.9
Rivodutri	Rieti	1,121	26.79	41.8
Rocca Canterano	Rome	170	15.84	10.7
Rocca d'Arce	Frosinone	835	11.58	72.1
Rocca di Cave	Rome	364	11.09	32.8
Rocca di Papa	Rome	17,989	39.72	452.9
Rocca Massima	Latina	1,127	18.17	62.0
Rocca Priora	Rome	12,130	28.27	429.1
Rocca Santo Stefano	Rome	906	9.57	94.7
Rocca Sinibalda	Rieti	801	49.56	16.2
Roccagiovine	Rome	246	8.41	29.3
Roccagorga	Latina	4,087	24.49	166.9
Roccantica	Rieti	542	16.72	32.4
Roccasecca	Frosinone	6,671	43.33	154.0
Roccasecca dei Volsci	Latina	1,060	23.50	45.1
Roiate	Rome	639	10.35	61.7
Rome	Rome	2,745,062	1287.36	2,132.3
Ronciglione	Viterbo	8,439	52.53	160.7
Roviano	Rome	1,232	8.50	144.9
Sabaudia	Latina	19,326	145.37	132.9
Sacrofano	Rome	7,512	28.43	264.2
Salisano	Rieti	462	17.60	26.3
Sambuci	Rome	833	8.30	100.4
San Biagio Saracinisco	Frosinone	289	31.21	9.3
San Cesareo	Rome	16,383	23.64	693.0
San Donato Val di Comino	Frosinone	1,852	37.64	49.2
San Felice Circeo	Latina	10,089	32.63	309.2
San Giorgio a Liri	Frosinone	2,927	15.71	186.3
San Giovanni Incarico	Frosinone	2,966	24.71	120.0
San Gregorio da Sassola	Rome	1,385	35.45	39.1
San Lorenzo Nuovo	Viterbo	2,029	26.74	75.9
San Polo dei Cavalieri	Rome	2,804	42.53	65.9
San Vito Romano	Rome	3,012	12.66	237.9
San Vittore del Lazio	Frosinone	2,339	27.51	85.0
Sant'Ambrogio sul Garigliano	Frosinone	865	17.11	50.6
Sant'Andrea del Garigliano	Frosinone	1,263	21.36	59.1
Sant'Angelo Romano	Rome	5,066	18.02	281.1
Sant'Apollinare	Frosinone	1,765	41.10	42.9
Sant'Elia Fiumerapido	Frosinone	5,549	43.89	126.4
Sant'Oreste	Rome	3,398	21.60	157.3
Santa Marinella	Rome	18,445	9.03	2,042.6
Santi Cosma e Damiano	Latina	6,878	48.91	140.6
Santopadre	Frosinone	1,175	31.61	37.2
Saracinesco	Rome	177	11.16	15.9
Scandriglia	Rieti	3,347	63.35	52.8
Segni	Rome	8,961	60.86	147.2
Selci	Rieti	1,117	7.73	144.5
Sermoneta	Latina	9,951	45.00	221.1
Serrone	Frosinone	2,935	15.39	190.7
Settefrati	Frosinone	700	50.68	13.8
Sezze	Latina	23,766	100.47	236.5
Sgurgola	Frosinone	2,380	19.22	123.8
Sonnino	Latina	7,465	63.82	117.0
Sora	Frosinone	24,672	72.13	342.0
Soriano nel Cimino	Viterbo	7,888	78.54	100.4
Sperlonga	Latina	2,990	19.49	153.4
Spigno Saturnia	Latina	2,845	38.74	73.4
Stimigliano	Rieti	2,205	11.38	193.8
Strangolagalli	Frosinone	2,253	10.57	213.2
Subiaco	Rome	8,527	63.23	134.9
Supino	Frosinone	4,557	35.59	128.0
Sutri	Viterbo	6,764	60.94	111.0
Tarano	Rieti	1,369	19.98	68.5
Tarquinia	Viterbo	15,862	279.34	56.8
Terelle	Frosinone	263	31.65	8.3
Terracina	Latina	45,055	136.59	329.9
Tessennano	Viterbo	283	14.73	19.2
Tivoli	Rome	55,321	68.65	805.8
Toffia	Rieti	1,050	11.33	92.7
Tolfa	Rome	4,691	168.27	27.9
Torre Cajetani	Frosinone	1,317	11.99	109.8
Torri in Sabina	Rieti	1,209	26.31	46.0
Torrice	Frosinone	4,648	18.06	257.4
Torricella in Sabina	Rieti	1,283	25.79	49.7
Torrita Tiberina	Rome	1,116	10.78	103.5
Trevi nel Lazio	Frosinone	1,699	54.32	31.3
Trevignano Romano	Rome	5,755	38.99	147.6
Trivigliano	Frosinone	1,594	12.64	126.1
Turania	Rieti	233	8.51	27.4
Tuscania	Viterbo	8,088	208.69	38.8
Vacone	Rieti	214	9.19	23.3
Valentano	Viterbo	2,854	43.50	65.6
Vallecorsa	Frosinone	2,323	39.28	59.1
Vallemaio	Frosinone	881	18.54	47.5
Vallepietra	Rome	223	52.94	4.2
Vallerano	Viterbo	2,349	15.45	152.0
Vallerotonda	Frosinone	1,365	59.66	22.9
Vallinfreda	Rome	260	16.72	15.6
Valmontone	Rome	15,654	40.91	382.6
Varco Sabino	Rieti	148	24.75	6.0
Vasanello	Viterbo	3,959	28.96	136.7
Vejano	Viterbo	2,147	44.31	48.5
Velletri	Rome	53,048	118.23	448.7
Ventotene	Latina	678	1.75	387.4
Veroli	Frosinone	19,402	119.65	162.2
Vetralla	Viterbo	13,370	113.77	117.5
Vicalvi	Frosinone	694	8.21	84.5
Vico nel Lazio	Frosinone	2,050	45.85	44.7
Vicovaro	Rome	3,520	35.94	97.9
Vignanello	Viterbo	4,260	20.53	207.5
Villa Latina	Frosinone	1,129	17.02	66.3
Villa San Giovanni in Tuscia	Viterbo	1,212	5.28	229.5
Villa Santa Lucia	Frosinone	2,436	17.77	137.1
Villa Santo Stefano	Frosinone	1,564	20.10	77.8
Viterbo	Viterbo	66,767	406.23	164.4
Viticuso	Frosinone	282	20.86	13.5
Vitorchiano	Viterbo	5,221	30.14	173.2
Vivaro Romano	Rome	150	12.54	12.0
Zagarolo	Rome	18,963	28.04	676.3

== See also ==
- List of municipalities of Italy
