= List of municipalities of the Province of Viterbo =

The following is a list of the 60 municipalities (comuni) of the Province of Viterbo in the region of Lazio in Italy.

== List ==
Municipality	Population (2026)	Area (km^{2})	Density
Acquapendente	5,222	131.61	39.7
Arlena di Castro	791	21.87	36.2
Bagnoregio	3,258	72.81	44.7
Barbarano Romano	980	37.56	26.1
Bassano in Teverina	1,272	12.17	104.5
Bassano Romano	4,680	37.55	124.6
Blera	2,895	92.92	31.2
Bolsena	3,649	63.57	57.4
Bomarzo	1,695	39.65	42.7
Calcata	905	7.63	118.6
Canepina	2,900	20.85	139.1
Canino	5,029	124.04	40.5
Capodimonte	1,647	61.29	26.9
Capranica	6,351	40.97	155.0
Caprarola	5,160	57.58	89.6
Carbognano	1,951	17.41	112.1
Castel Sant'Elia	2,411	23.92	100.8
Castiglione in Teverina	2,289	19.89	115.1
Celleno	1,315	23.82	55.2
Cellere	1,087	37.20	29.2
Civita Castellana	15,011	84.22	178.2
Civitella d'Agliano	1,444	32.96	43.8
Corchiano	3,531	33.03	106.9
Fabrica di Roma	8,167	34.79	234.8
Faleria	2,024	25.68	78.8
Farnese	1,337	52.38	25.5
Gallese	2,551	37.17	68.6
Gradoli	1,220	43.81	27.8
Graffignano	2,058	29.10	70.7
Grotte di Castro	2,374	33.42	71.0
Ischia di Castro	2,107	104.95	20.1
Latera	772	22.43	34.4
Lubriano	841	16.69	50.4
Marta	3,211	33.54	95.7
Montalto di Castro	8,679	189.63	45.8
Monte Romano	1,847	86.14	21.4
Montefiascone	12,979	104.93	123.7
Monterosi	4,789	10.68	448.4
Nepi	9,550	83.71	114.1
Onano	865	24.51	35.3
Oriolo Romano	3,673	19.31	190.2
Orte	9,243	69.56	132.9
Piansano	2,039	26.61	76.6
Proceno	521	42.02	12.4
Ronciglione	8,439	52.53	160.7
San Lorenzo Nuovo	2,029	26.74	75.9
Soriano nel Cimino	7,888	78.54	100.4
Sutri	6,764	60.94	111.0
Tarquinia	15,862	279.34	56.8
Tessennano	283	14.73	19.2
Tuscania	8,088	208.69	38.8
Valentano	2,854	43.50	65.6
Vallerano	2,349	15.45	152.0
Vasanello	3,959	28.96	136.7
Vejano	2,147	44.31	48.5
Vetralla	13,370	113.77	117.5
Vignanello	4,260	20.53	207.5
Villa San Giovanni in Tuscia	1,212	5.28	229.5
Viterbo	66,767	406.23	164.4
Vitorchiano	5,221	30.14	173.2

== See also ==
- List of municipalities of Lazio
- List of municipalities of Italy
