= List of municipalities of the Province of Latina =

The following is a list of the 33 municipalities (comuni) of the Province of Latina in the region of Lazio in Italy.

== List ==
Municipality	Population (2026)	Area (km^{2})	Density
Aprilia	74,697	178.11	419.4
Bassiano	1,432	32.40	44.2
Campodimele	545	38.38	14.2
Castelforte	4,010	29.71	135.0
Cisterna di Latina	36,255	144.16	251.5
Cori	10,465	85.31	122.7
Fondi	40,310	143.92	280.1
Formia	36,775	74.17	495.8
Gaeta	18,908	29.20	647.5
Itri	10,579	101.10	104.6
Latina	127,450	277.62	459.1
Lenola	4,095	45.24	90.5
Maenza	2,956	42.13	70.2
Minturno	20,400	42.14	484.1
Monte San Biagio	6,028	65.10	92.6
Norma	3,723	31.22	119.3
Pontinia	15,084	112.10	134.6
Ponza	3,295	10.16	324.3
Priverno	13,694	56.98	240.3
Prossedi	1,112	35.37	31.4
Rocca Massima	1,127	18.17	62.0
Roccagorga	4,087	24.49	166.9
Roccasecca dei Volsci	1,060	23.50	45.1
Sabaudia	19,326	145.37	132.9
San Felice Circeo	10,089	32.63	309.2
Santi Cosma e Damiano	6,878	48.91	140.6
Sermoneta	9,951	45.00	221.1
Sezze	23,766	100.47	236.5
Sonnino	7,465	63.82	117.0
Sperlonga	2,990	19.49	153.4
Spigno Saturnia	2,845	38.74	73.4
Terracina	45,055	136.59	329.9
Ventotene	678	1.75	387.4

== See also ==
- List of municipalities of Italy
- List of municipalities of Lazio
