= Varco Sabino =

- Comune
- Comune di Varco Sabino
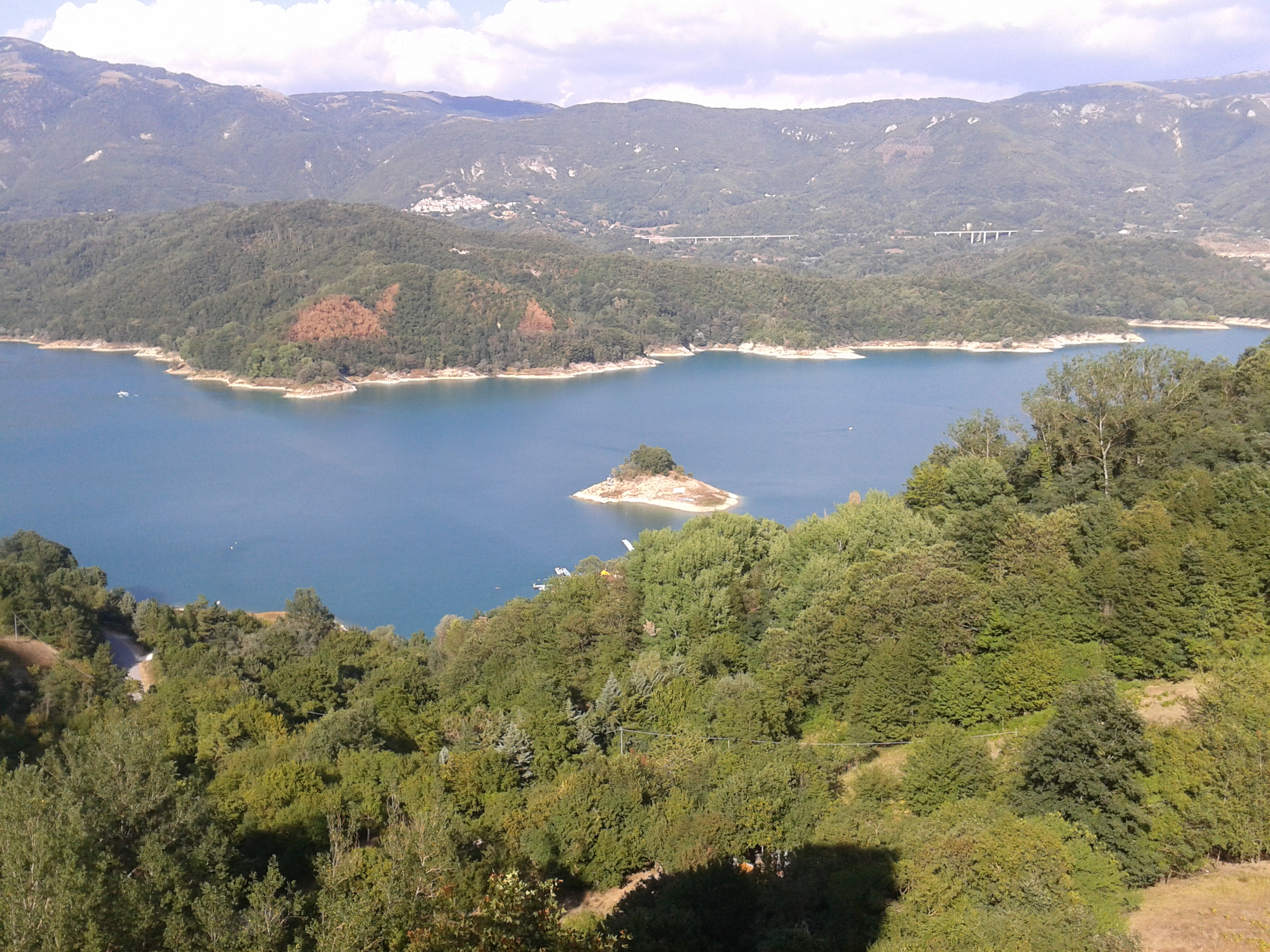

- Varco Sabino within the Province of Rieti

- Location within Italy Location within Lazio
- Coordinates: 42°14′20″N 13°01′10″E
- Country: Italy
- Region: Lazio
- Province: Rieti (RI)
- Frazioni: Rigatti

Government
  - Mayor: Gabriele Maglioni

Area
  - Total: 24.75 km^{2} (9.56 sq mi)
- Elevation: 742 m (2,434 ft)

Population (1 January 2016)
  - Total: 187
  - Density: 7.56/km^{2} (19.6/sq mi)
- Demonym: Varcolani
- Time zone: UTC+1 (CET)
  - Summer (DST): UTC+2 (CEST)
- Postal code: 02020
- Dialing code: (+39) 765
- Website: Official website

Varco Sabino is a comune (municipality) in the Province of Rieti in the Italian region of Latium, located about 60 kilometres (37 miles) northeast of Rome and about 20 kilometres (12 mi) southeast of Rieti.

The municipality borders with Ascrea, Castel di Tora, Concerviano, Marcetelli, Paganico Sabino, Pescorocchiano, Petrella Salto and Rocca Sinibalda.
