= Longone Sabino =

- Comune
- Comune di Longone Sabino
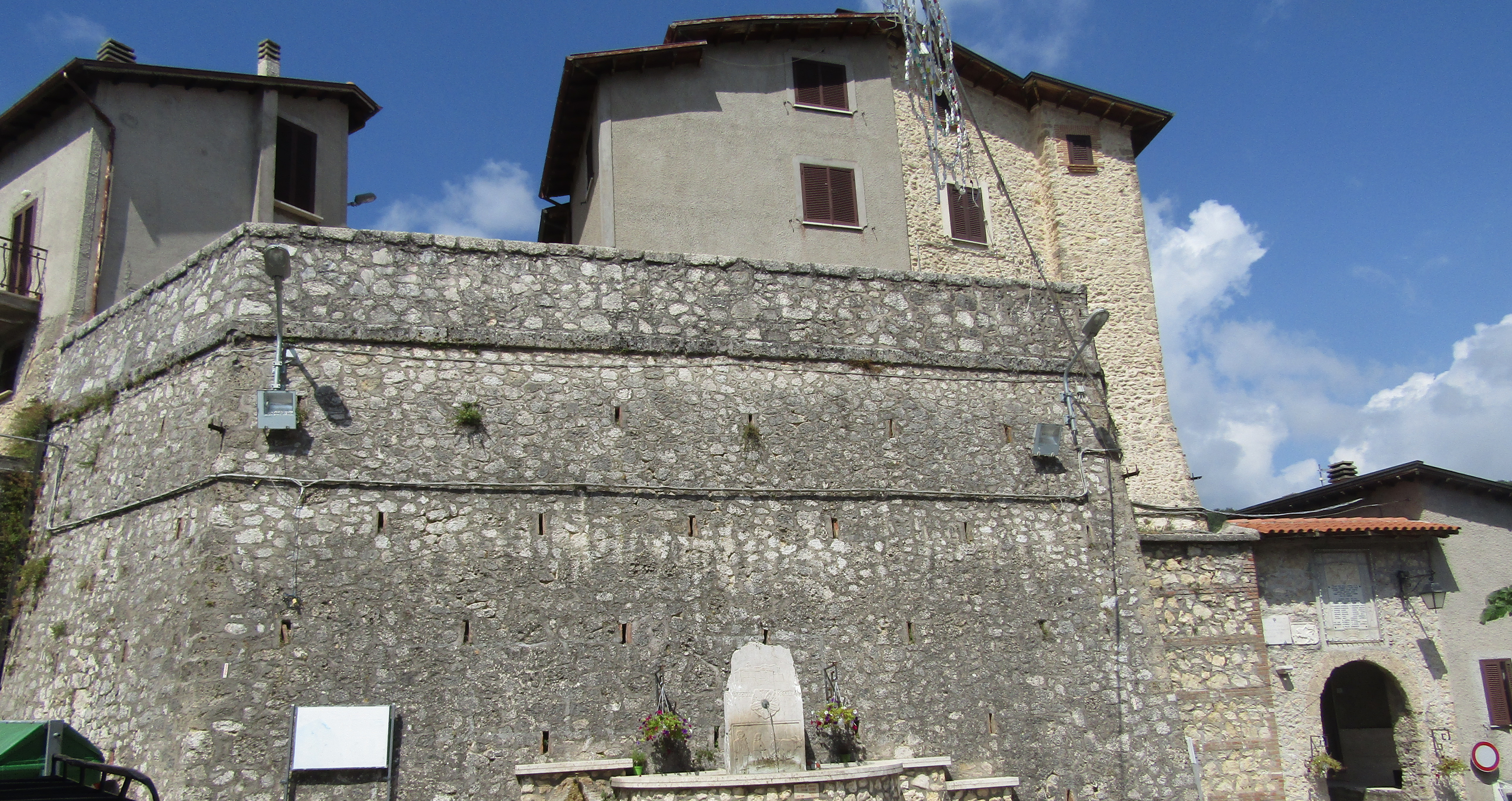
- View of Longone Sabino

- Coat of arms

- Longone Sabino within the Province of Rieti

- Location within Italy Location within Lazio
- Coordinates: 42°16′N 12°58′E
- Country: Italy
- Region: Lazio
- Province: Rieti (RI)
- Frazioni: Fassinoro, Roccaranieri, San Silvestro

Government
  - Mayor: Santino Pezzotti

Area
  - Total: 34.33 km^{2} (13.25 sq mi)
- Elevation: 804 m (2,638 ft)

Population (31 March 2017)
  - Total: 570
  - Density: 17/km^{2} (43/sq mi)
- Demonym: Longonesi
- Time zone: UTC+1 (CET)
  - Summer (DST): UTC+2 (CEST)
- Postal code: 02020
- Dialing code: 0765
- Website: Official website

Longone Sabino is a comune (municipality) in the Province of Rieti in the Italian region of Latium, located about 60 kilometres (37 mi) northeast of Rome and about 15 kilometres (9 mi) southeast of Rieti.

== Geography ==
The municipality borders with Ascrea, Belmonte in Sabina, Cittaducale, Concerviano, Petrella Salto, Rieti and Rocca Sinibalda. The municipal territory counts a northern exclave in which are located its hamlets (frazioni): Fassinoro, Roccaranieri and San Silvestro.
