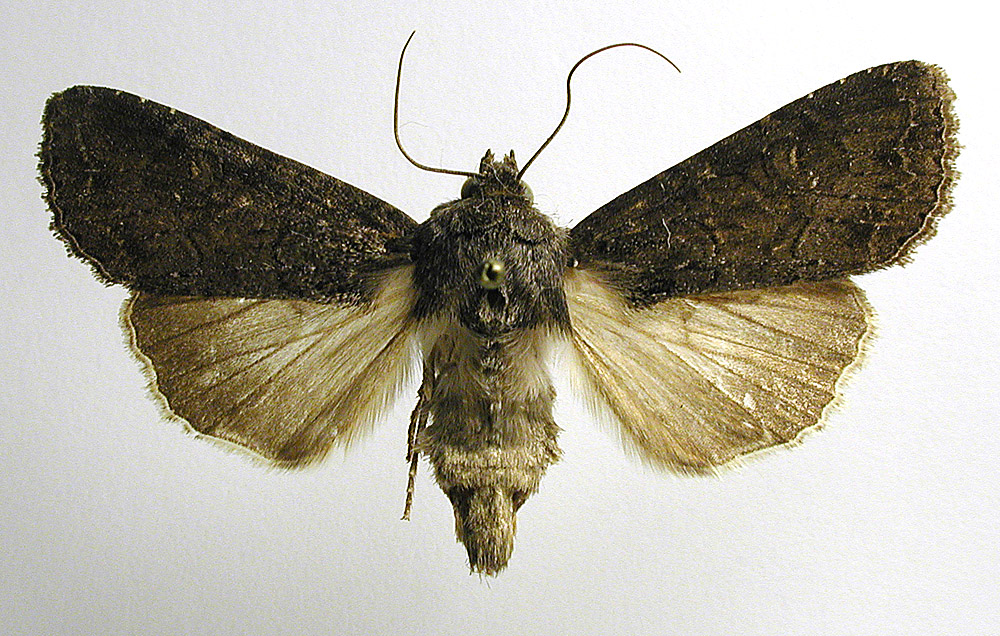

Scientific classification
- Kingdom: Animalia
- Phylum: Arthropoda
- Class: Insecta
- Order: Lepidoptera
- Superfamily: Noctuoidea
- Family: Noctuidae
- Genus: Apamea
- Species: A. oblonga

Binomial name
- Apamea oblonga (Haworth, 1809)

Synonyms
- Noctua oblonga Haworth, 1809; Noctua lunulina Haworth, 1809; Noctua abjecta Hübner, [1813]; Hadena fribolus Biosduval, [1837]; Hadena abjecta var. variegata Staudinger, 1871

= Apamea oblonga =

Crescent striped

Species of moth

Apamea oblonga, the crescent striped, is a moth of the family Noctuidae. The species was first described by Adrian Hardy Haworth in 1809. It is found in northern and central Europe, east to southern Russia, Asia Minor, Armenia, Turkestan, Turkey, Iran, southern Siberia, northern Pakistan, Mongolia, China (Xinjiang, Heilongjiang, Ningxia), Sakhalin and Japan.

== Description ==
The wingspan is about 43–48 mm. Forewing blackish fuscous; the space between outer and submarginal lines paler, brownish grey, the upper stigmata filled in with white or ochreous; the median area and terminal area on each side of submarginal line blacker; a deep black streak from base below cell and a thick black space along submedian fold between claviform stigma and outer line; hindwing dull ochreous grey with dark veins and cellspot; the terminal half fuscous and the fringe whitish; — lunulina Haw. is blacker with both stigmata dark, the reniform with a few pale dots on outer side; — fribolus Bsd. is uniformly black with all markings obscured; the only pale markings being the whitish dots on outer edge of the reniform and the praeapical costal dots; — ab. variegata Stgr., from Armenia and Turania, has the thorax variegated with white; the forewing with whitish suffusion beyond reniform and at apex; the black markings strong; the hues defined by whitish, and the stigmata with white annuli; this must be very nearly the same as oblonga Haw., which Staudinger has ignored; the grey brown form with the markings fairly plain is abjecta Hbn., of which the extreme form, unicolor Tutt, with the markings obsolete, and the whole wing grey brown, is the usual form in the east of Britain.

Adults are on wing from June to August. There is one generation per year.

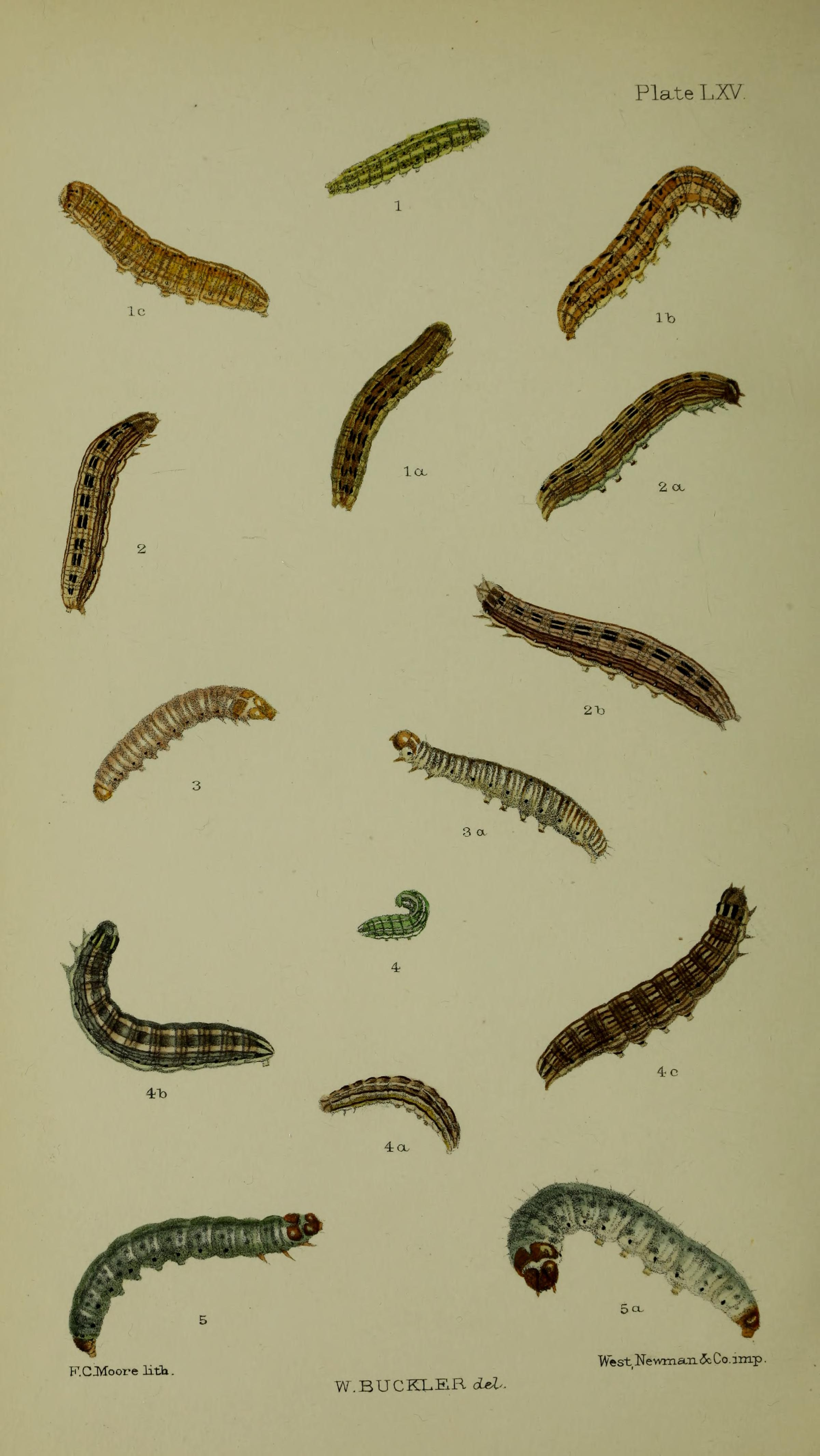
Figs. 5, 5a larva after last moult

The larvae are greenish grey, with the raised dots rather greyer; a pinkish line along the back; head and plate on first and last rings shining reddish brown. They feed on various grasses, including alkali grass species. They mostly feed on the bases of the stems and roots.
