= Vivaro Romano =

- Comune
- Comune di Vivaro Romano
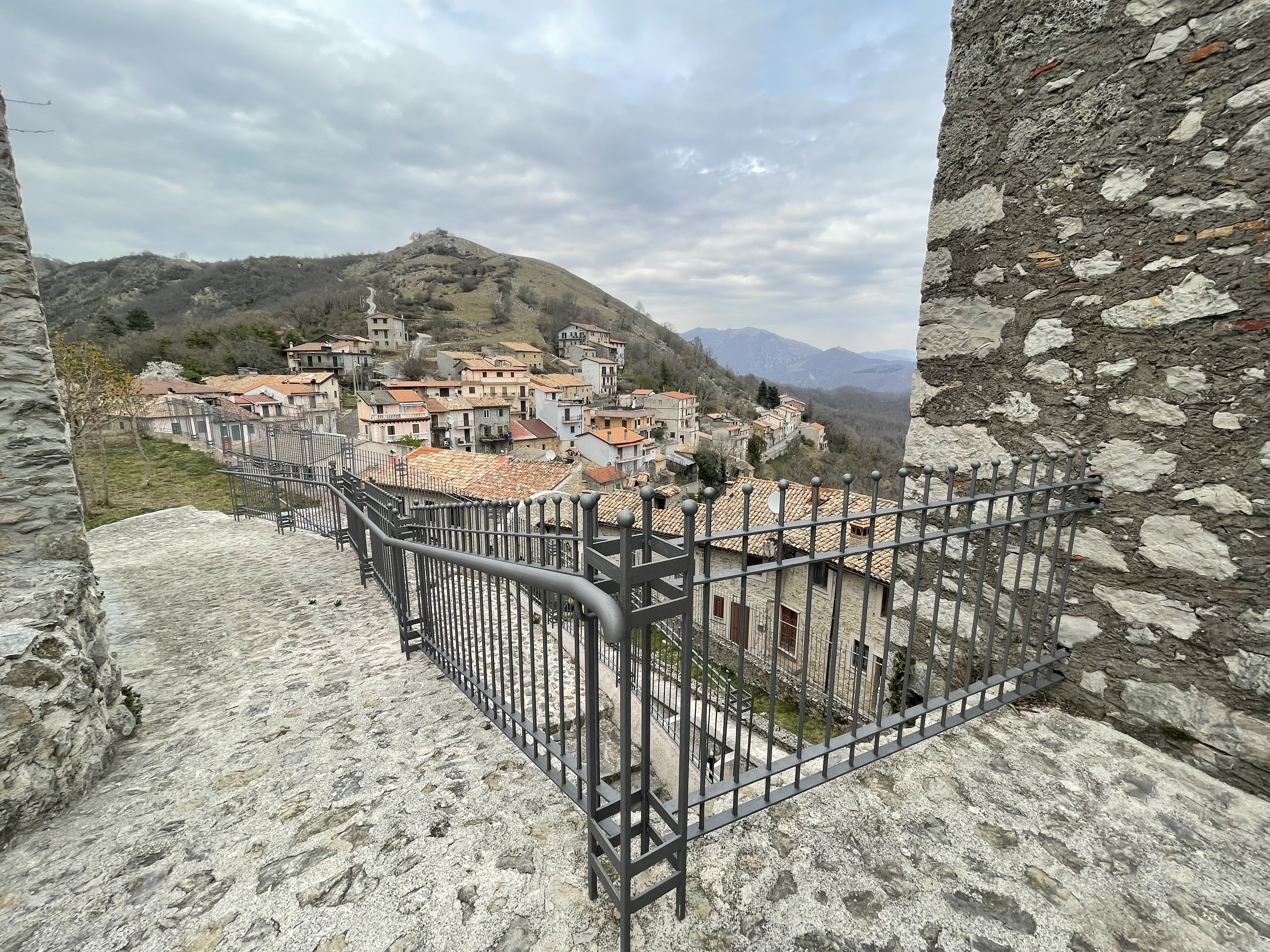
- Vivaro Romano seen from the Borghese Castle ruins.

- Location within Italy Location within Lazio
- Coordinates: 42°6′N 13°0′E
- Country: Italy
- Region: Lazio
- Metropolitan city: Rome (RM)

Government
  - Mayor: Beatrice Sforza

Area
  - Total: 12.5 km^{2} (4.8 sq mi)
- Elevation: 756 m (2,480 ft)

Population (1 January 2025)
  - Total: 156
  - Density: 12.5/km^{2} (32.3/sq mi)
- Demonym: Vivaresi
- Time zone: UTC+1 (CET)
  - Summer (DST): UTC+2 (CEST)
- Postal code: 00020
- Dialing code: 0774
- Patron saint: St. Blaise
- Saint day: 3 February
- Website: Official website

Vivaro Romano (Sabino: U Juaru) is a comune (municipality) in the Metropolitan City of Rome in the Italian region Lazio, located about 50 kilometres (31 mi) northeast of Rome.

Vivaro Romano borders the following municipalities: Carsoli, Oricola, Orvinio, Pozzaglia Sabina, Turania, Vallinfreda. Sights include the parish church of San Biagio, the sanctuary of Santa Maria Illuminata and remains of a castle.

== Main sights ==
- Church of Saint Blaise
- Church of Anthony of Padua
- Sanctuary of Santa Maria Illuminata
- Fountain in Piazza della Peschiera
- Fountain of Scentella
- La Mola and La Moletta, ancient mills of the 1867
- Castello Borghese (Borghese's Castle), the ruins of an ancient castle of around 1012
- La Nocchia, la Scentella, Saint Benedict's spring; several permanent springs around the municipality
