= Colle di Tora =

- Comune
- Comune di Colle di Tora
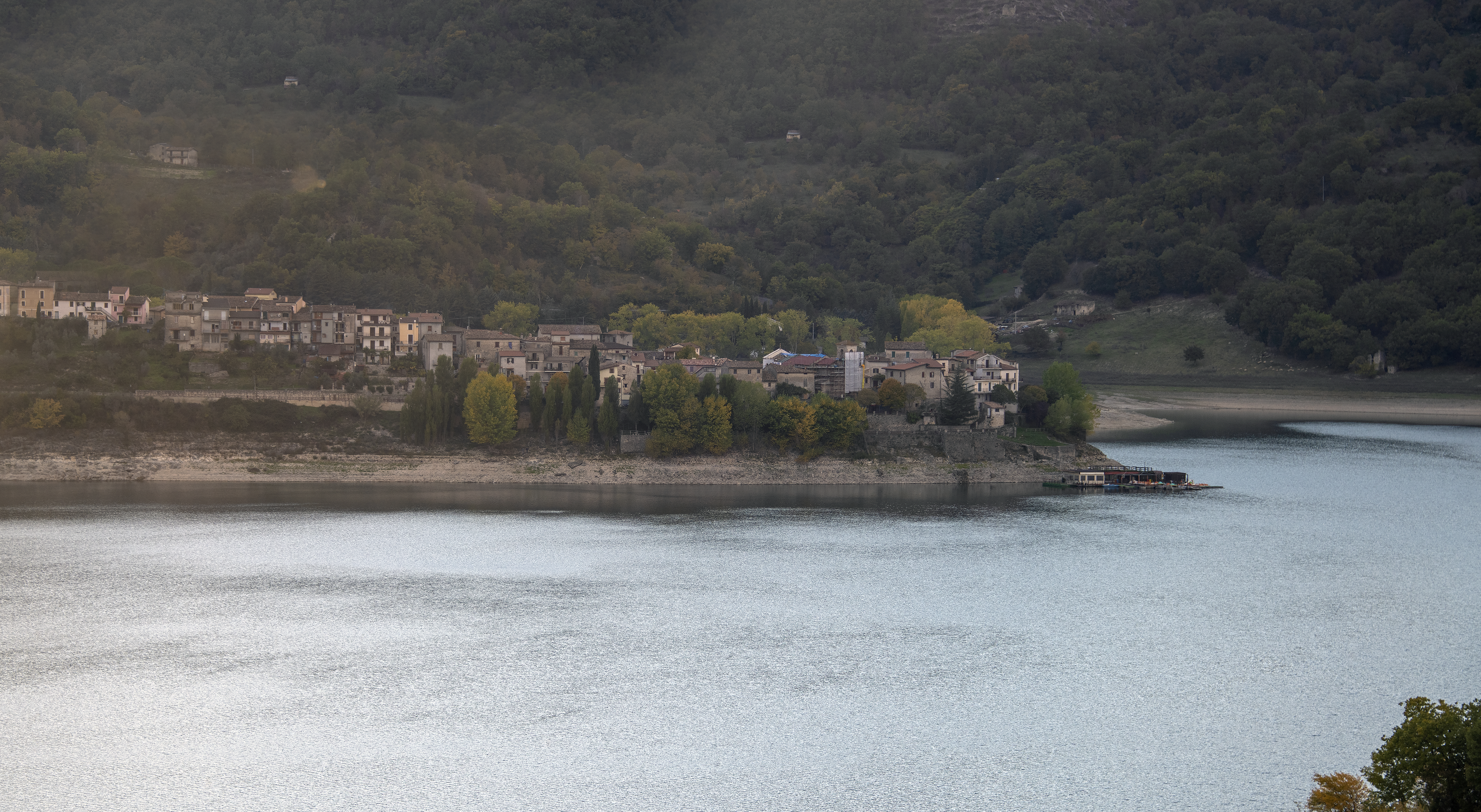
- View of Colle di Tora

- Location within Italy Location within Lazio
- Coordinates: 42°13′N 12°57′E
- Country: Italy
- Region: Lazio
- Province: Rieti (RI)

Government
  - Mayor: Beniamino Pandolfi

Area
  - Total: 14.37 km^{2} (5.55 sq mi)
- Elevation: 542 m (1,778 ft)

Population (31 March 2017)
  - Total: 356
  - Density: 24.8/km^{2} (64.2/sq mi)
- Demonym: Collepiccolesi
- Time zone: UTC+1 (CET)
  - Summer (DST): UTC+2 (CEST)
- Postal code: 02020
- Dialing code: 0765
- Website: Official website

Colle di Tora is a comune (municipality) in the Province of Rieti in the Italian region of Latium, located about 50 kilometres (31 mi) northeast of Rome and about 20 kilometres (12 mi) southeast of Rieti. It is located on the shores of Lake Turano.

Colle di Tora borders the following municipalities: Castel di Tora, Poggio Moiano, Pozzaglia Sabina, Rocca Sinibalda.
