= Castel di Tora =

- Comune
- Comune di Castel di Tora
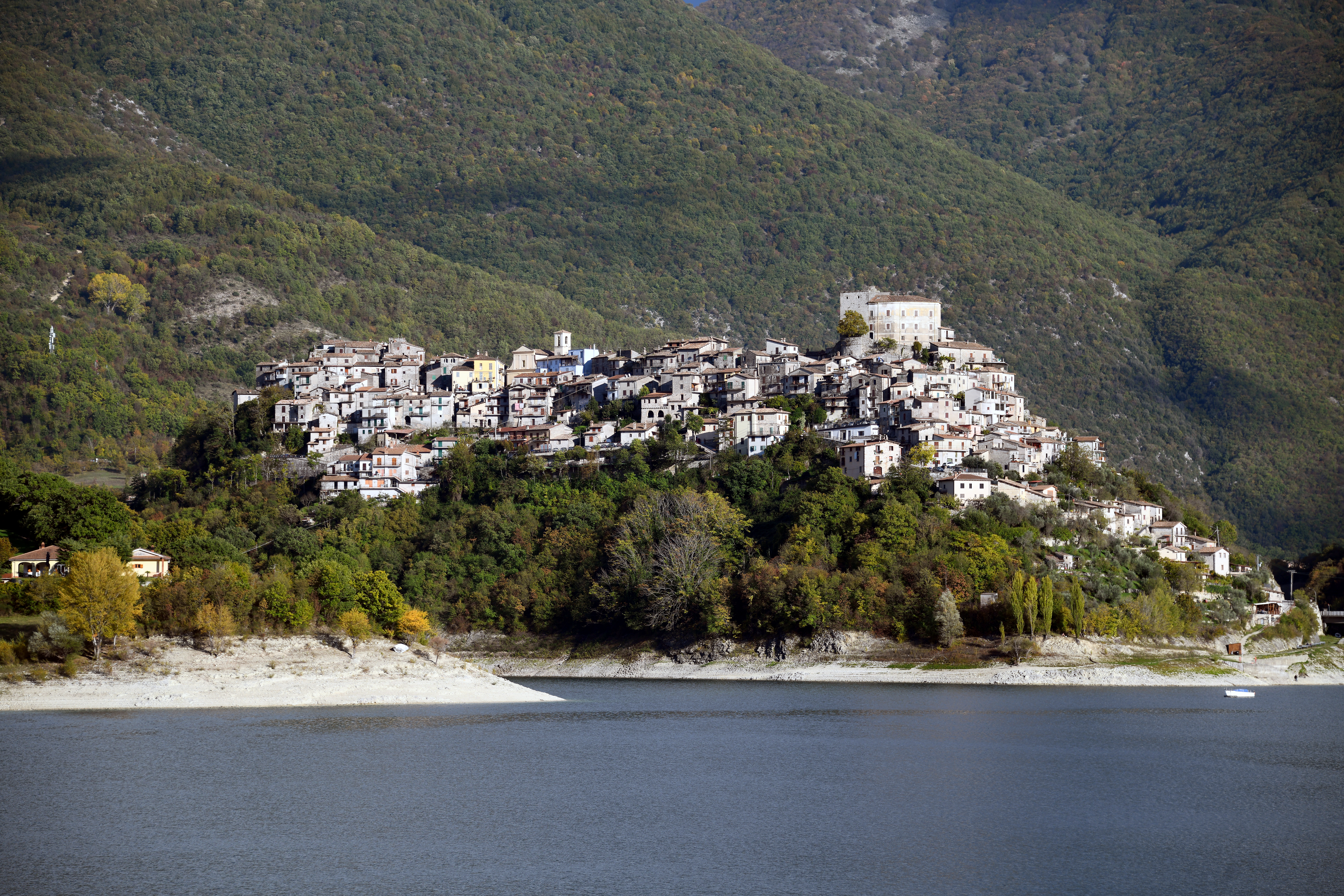
- View of Castel di Tora

- Location within Italy Location within Lazio
- Coordinates: 42°13′N 12°58′E
- Country: Italy
- Region: Lazio
- Province: Rieti (RI)

Government
  - Mayor: Cesarina D'Alessandro

Area
  - Total: 15.49 km^{2} (5.98 sq mi)
- Elevation: 607 m (1,991 ft)

Population (31 March 2017)
  - Total: 278
  - Density: 17.9/km^{2} (46.5/sq mi)
- Demonym: Castelvecchiesi
- Time zone: UTC+1 (CET)
  - Summer (DST): UTC+2 (CEST)
- Postal code: 02020
- Dialing code: 0765
- Website: Official website

Castel di Tora is a comune (municipality) in the Province of Rieti in the Italian region of Lazio, located about 50 kilometres (31 mi) northeast of Rome and about 20 kilometres (12 mi) southeast of Rieti.

Castel di Tora borders the following municipalities: Ascrea, Colle di Tora, Pozzaglia Sabina, Rocca Sinibalda, Varco Sabino. It is located on the shores of Lake Turano.

Sights include the pentagonal tower of the former castle, the hermitage of San Salvatore, and the sanctuary of Santa Anatolia. It is one of I Borghi più belli d'Italia ("The most beautiful villages of Italy").
