= Ascrea =

- Comune
- Comune di Ascrea
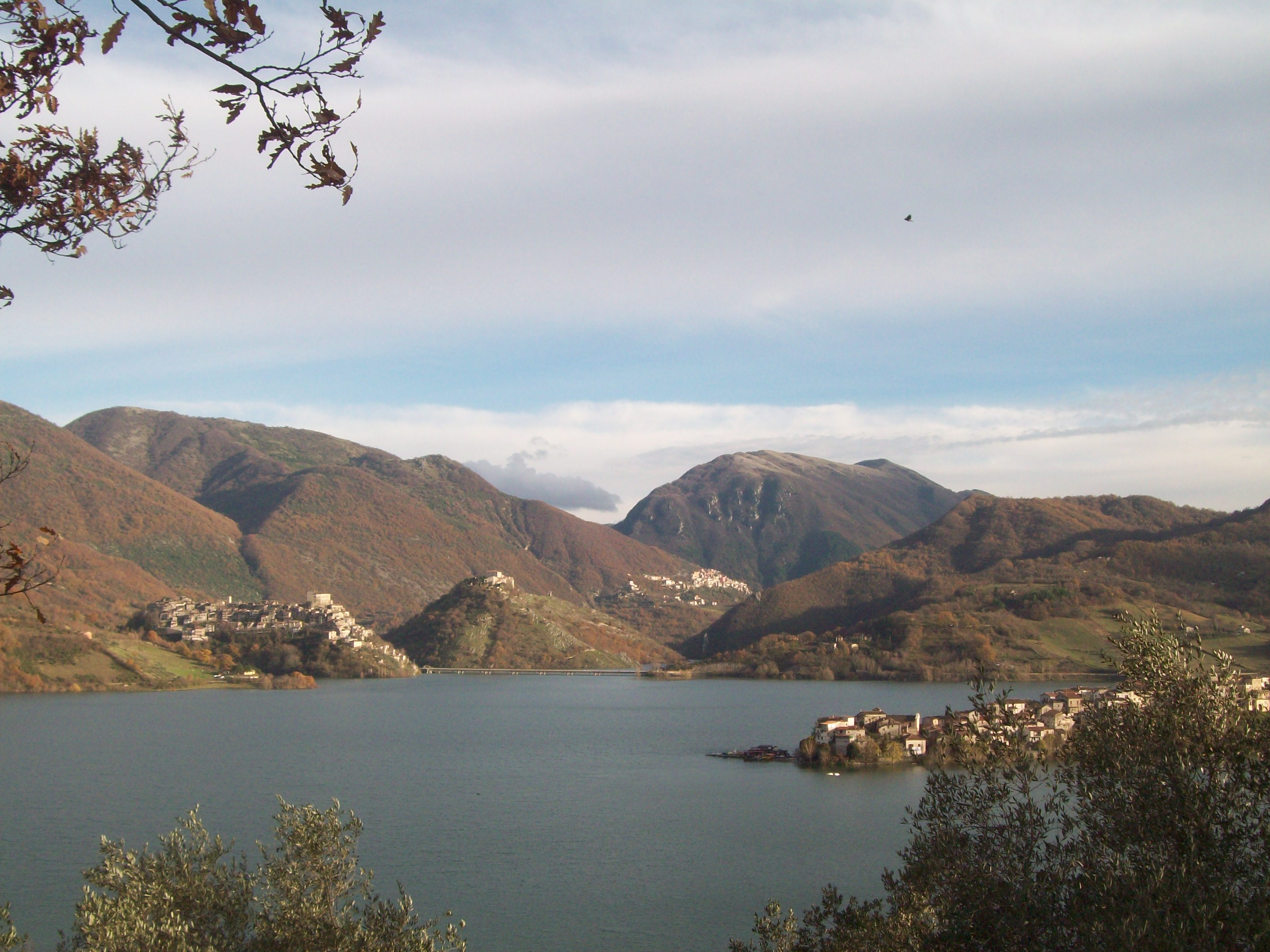
- Turano Lake with Ascrea in background

- Coat of arms

- Ascrea within the Province of Rieti

- Location of Ascrea in Italy Ascrea (Lazio)
- Coordinates: 42°11′49″N 12°59′51″E
- Country: Italy
- Region: Lazio
- Province: Rieti (RI)
- Frazioni: Stipes, Valleverde Stipes

Government
  - Mayor: Dante D'Angeli

Area
  - Total: 14.4 km^{2} (5.6 sq mi)
- Elevation: 318 m (1,043 ft)

Population (31 March 2017)
  - Total: 250
  - Density: 17/km^{2} (45/sq mi)
- Demonym: Ascreani
- Time zone: UTC+1 (CET)
  - Summer (DST): UTC+2 (CEST)
- Postal code: 02020
- Dialing code: 0765
- Website: Official website

Ascrea is a comune (municipality) in the Province of Rieti in the Italian region of Latium, located about 50 kilometres (31 mi) northeast of Rome and about 25 kilometres (16 mi) southeast of Rieti.

== Geography ==
It is an agricultural centre in the middle valley of the river Turano}. The municipality borders with Castel di Tora, Collegiove, Longone Sabino, Marcetelli, Paganico Sabino, Pozzaglia Sabina, Rocca Sinibalda and Varco Sabino.

The municipal territory includes a northern exclave in which are located its hamlets (frazioni): Stipes and Valleverde Stipes. A southeastern exclave is located few kilometers from the town.
