= Poggio Moiano =

- Comune
- Comune di Poggio Moiano
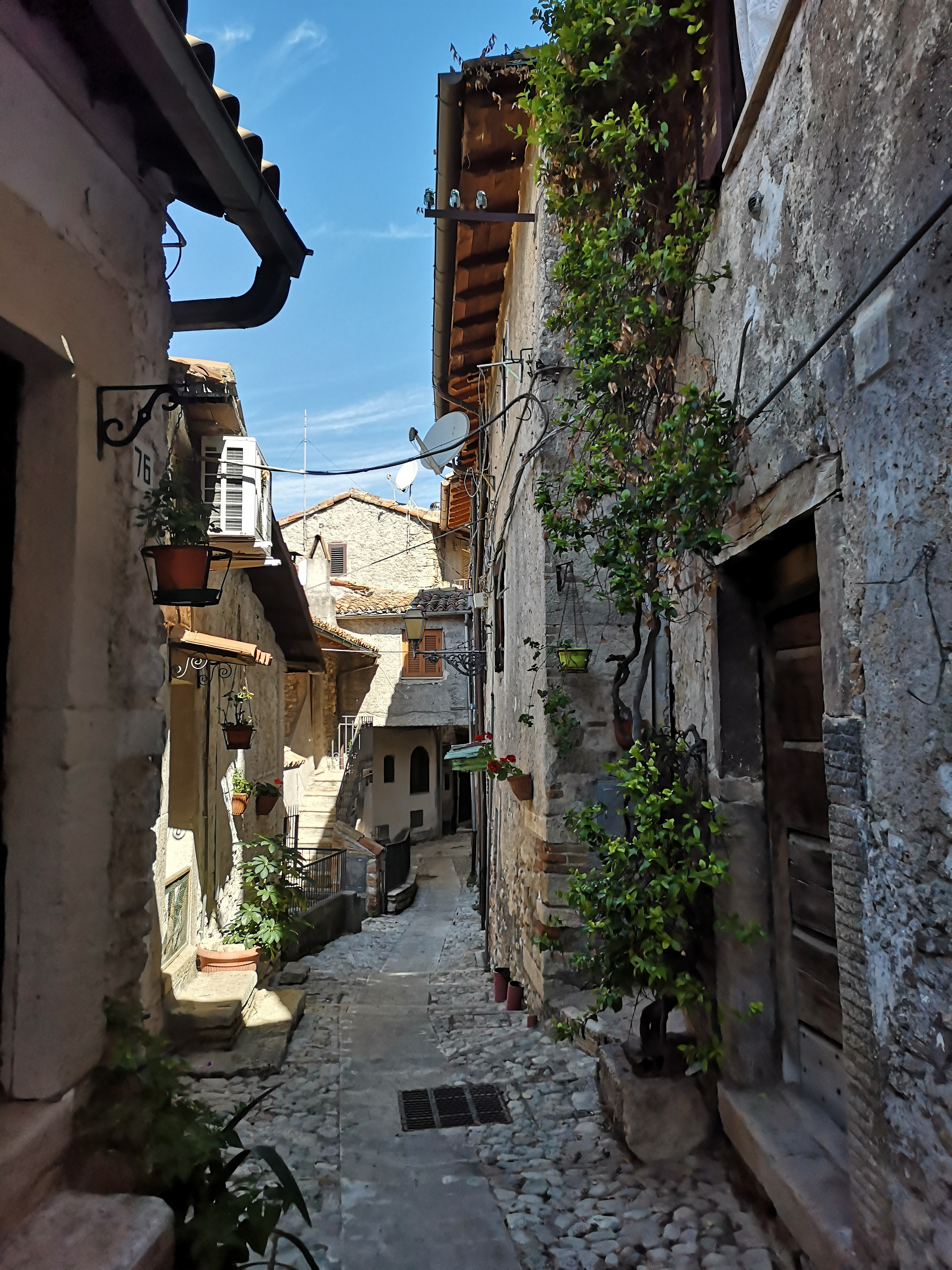
- View of Poggio Moiano

- Location within Italy Location within Lazio
- Coordinates: 42°12′N 12°53′E
- Country: Italy
- Region: Lazio
- Province: Rieti (RI)

Government
  - Mayor: Sandro Grossi

Area
  - Total: 26.95 km^{2} (10.41 sq mi)
- Elevation: 520 m (1,710 ft)

Population (30 November 2016)
  - Total: 2,705
  - Density: 100.4/km^{2} (260.0/sq mi)
- Demonym: Poggiomoianesi
- Time zone: UTC+1 (CET)
  - Summer (DST): UTC+2 (CEST)
- Postal code: 02037
- Dialing code: 0765
- Website: Official website

Poggio Moiano is a comune (municipality) in the Province of Rieti in the Italian region of Latium, located about 45 kilometres (28 mi) northeast of Rome and about 20 kilometres (12 mi) south of Rieti.

Poggio Moiano borders the following municipalities: Colle di Tora, Frasso Sabino, Monteleone Sabino, Poggio Nativo, Pozzaglia Sabina, Rocca Sinibalda, Scandriglia, Torricella in Sabina.
