= Marcetelli =

- Comune
- Comune di Marcetelli
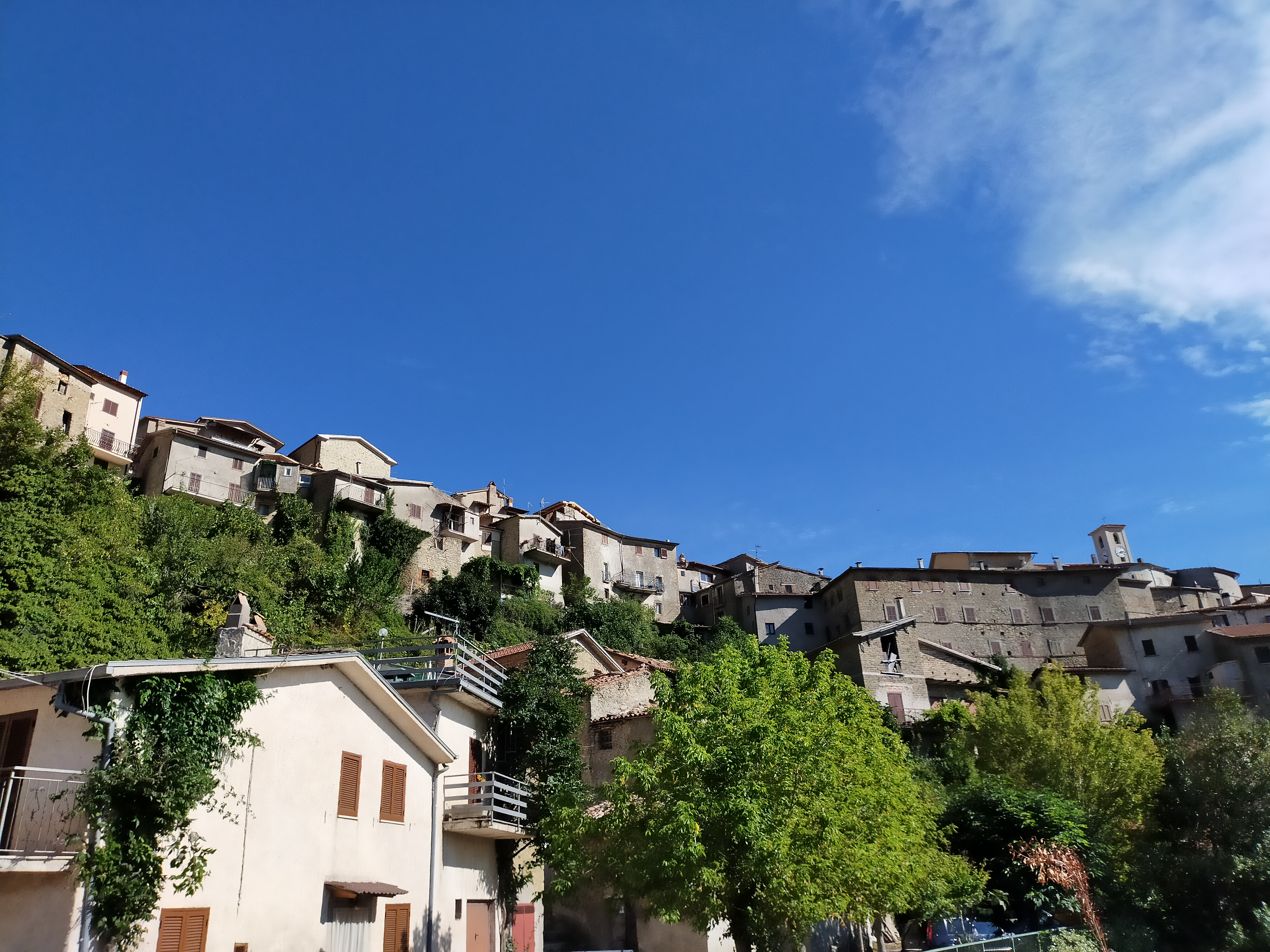
- View of Marcetelli

- Location within Italy Location within Lazio
- Coordinates: 42°14′N 13°3′E
- Country: Italy
- Region: Lazio
- Province: Rieti (RI)

Government
  - Mayor: Daniele Raimondi

Area
  - Total: 11.08 km^{2} (4.28 sq mi)
- Elevation: 930 m (3,050 ft)

Population (2026)
  - Total: 53
  - Density: 4.8/km^{2} (12/sq mi)
- Demonym: Marcetellani
- Time zone: UTC+1 (CET)
  - Summer (DST): UTC+2 (CEST)
- Postal code: 02020
- Dialing code: 0765
- Website: Official website

Marcetelli (Sabino: Marcitelli) is a village and comune (municipality) in the Province of Rieti in the region of Lazio in Italy, located about 60 kilometres (37 mi) northeast of Rome and about 25 kilometres (16 mi) southeast of Rieti. With a population of 53, it is the least populous municipality in Lazio and one of the least populous in Italy.

Marcetelli borders the municipalities of Ascrea, Collalto Sabino, Collegiove, Paganico Sabino, Pescorocchiano, and Varco Sabino.

== Demographics ==
As of 2026, the population is 53, of which 58.5% are male, and 41.5% are female. Minors make up 7.5% of the population, and seniors make up 39.6%.

Historical population

| Year | Pop. | ±% |
|---|---|---|
| 1861 | 608 | — |
| 1871 | 657 | +8.1% |
| 1881 | 636 | −3.2% |
| 1901 | 748 | +17.6% |
| 1911 | 798 | +6.7% |
| 1921 | 788 | −1.3% |
| 1931 | 763 | −3.2% |
| 1936 | 763 | +0.0% |

| Year | Pop. | ±% |
|---|---|---|
| 1951 | 723 | −5.2% |
| 1961 | 629 | −13.0% |
| 1971 | 407 | −35.3% |
| 1981 | 228 | −44.0% |
| 1991 | 182 | −20.2% |
| 2001 | 126 | −30.8% |
| 2011 | 97 | −23.0% |
| 2021 | 69 | −28.9% |

Source: ISTAT

=== Immigration ===
As of 2025, immigrants make up 1.9% of the total population. The foreign country of birth is Belgium.
