= Madonna della Speranza, Collalto Sabino =

Catholic church in Lazio, Italy

Coordinates: 42°08′12.1″N 13°02′55.2″E

Church of the Madonna della Speranza

Religion
- Affiliation: Roman Catholic

Location
- Location: Lazio, Italy
- Interactive map of Church of the Madonna della Speranza

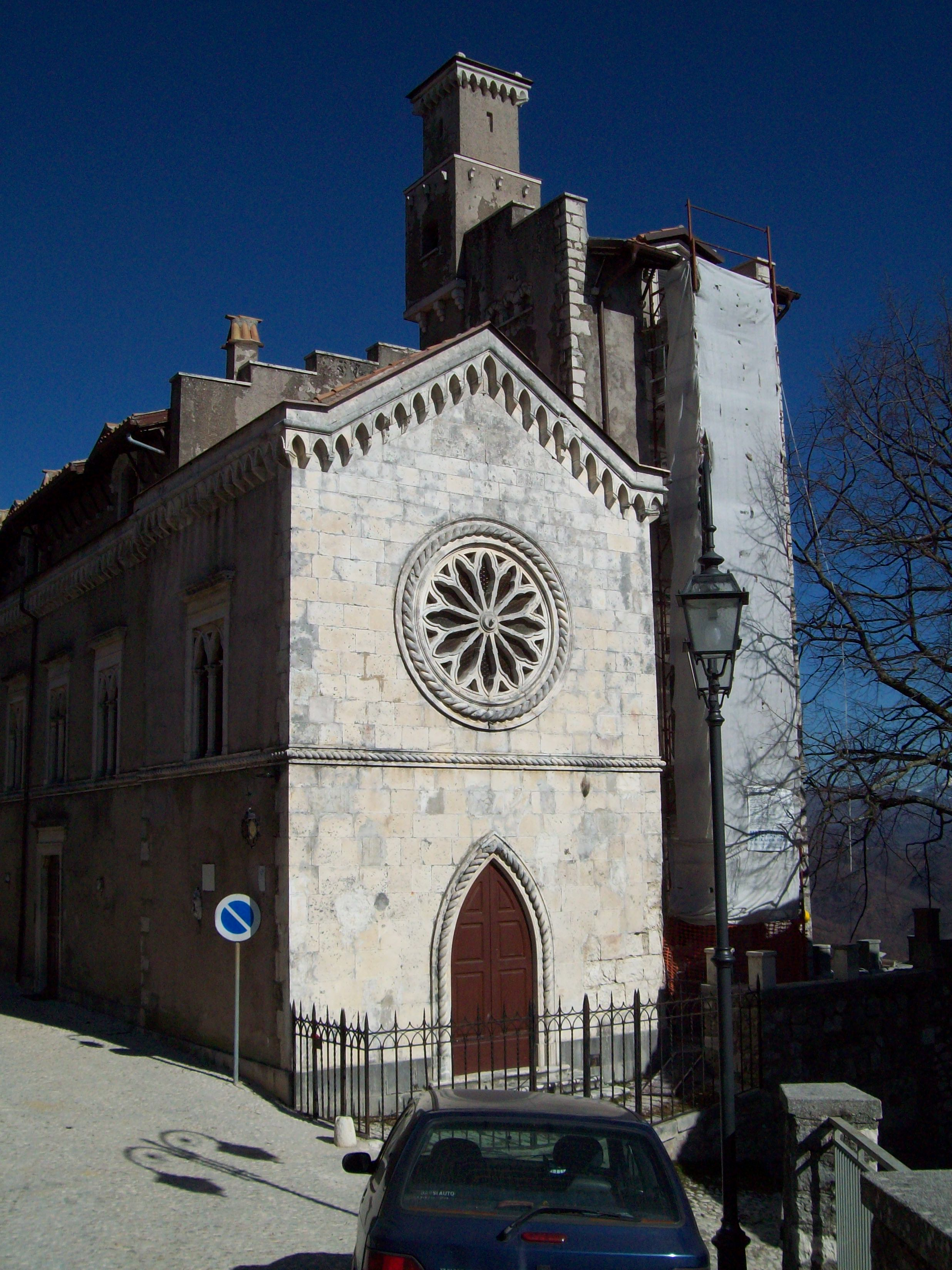
Madonna della Speranza

The Church of the Madonna della Speranza is a Roman Catholic chapel attached to a small palace known as Villino Latini, located just outside the town walls of Collalto Sabino, province of Rieti, in the region of Lazio, Italy.

The chapel and house were built in 1774 by the Latini family in a Neo-Gothic style with a large rose window in the facade. The Bell-tower, noted for its rectangular awkward asymmetries was added after the second world war. The chapel is mainly used for cultural celebrations or weddings. The villino has a notable garden.
