= Collalto Sabino =

- Comune
- Comune di Collalto Sabino
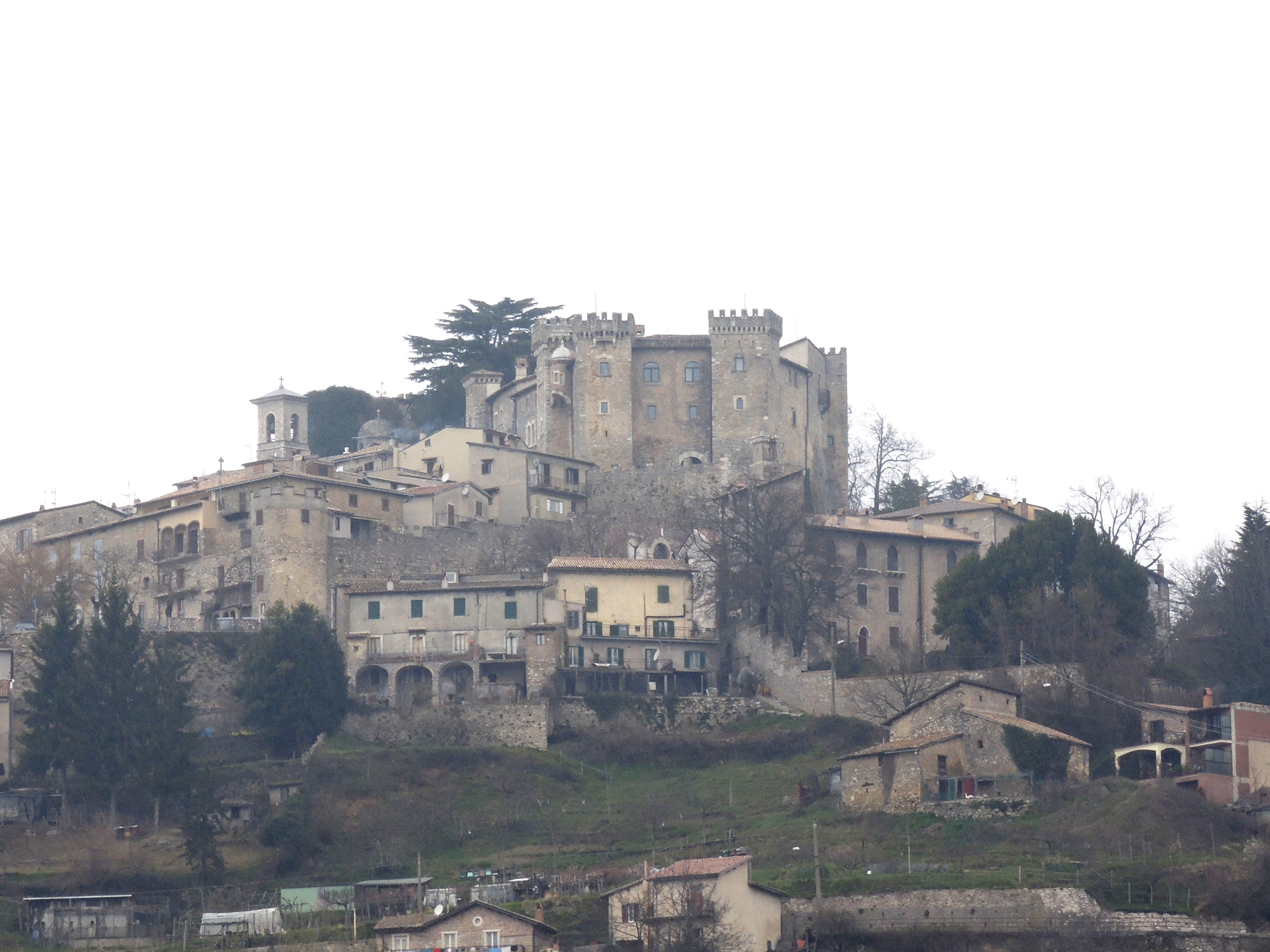
- View of Collalto Sabino

- Coat of arms

- Location within Italy Location within Lazio
- Coordinates: 42°8′N 13°3′E
- Country: Italy
- Region: Lazio
- Province: Rieti (RI)
- Frazioni: Ricetto, San Lorenzo

Government
  - Mayor: Maria Pia Mercuri

Area
  - Total: 22.2 km^{2} (8.6 sq mi)
- Elevation: 980 m (3,220 ft)

Population (30 June 2017)
  - Total: 421
  - Density: 19.0/km^{2} (49.1/sq mi)
- Demonym: Collaltesi
- Time zone: UTC+1 (CET)
  - Summer (DST): UTC+2 (CEST)
- Postal code: 02022
- Dialing code: 0765
- Patron saint: St. Gregory the Great
- Saint day: 3 September
- Website: Official website

Collalto Sabino (Sabino: Collartu) is a comune (municipality) in the Province of Rieti in the Italian region of Latium, located about 50 kilometres (31 mi) northeast of Rome and about 35 kilometres (22 mi) southeast of Rieti. It is one of I Borghi più belli d'Italia ("The most beautiful villages of Italy").

Collalto Sabino borders the following municipalities: Carsoli, Collegiove, Marcetelli, Nespolo, Pescorocchiano, Turania. It is located near the Lake Turano. It is home to a baronial Castle, which was owned by the Savelli, Strozzi, Soderini and, from 1641, by the Barberini families. The town is surrounded by a 15th-century line of walls.

Among the sites to the town are Palazzo Latini and the small church of Madonna della Speranza.

== Twin towns ==
- La Tagnière, France
