= Civitella d'Agliano =

- Comune
- Comune di Civitella d'Agliano
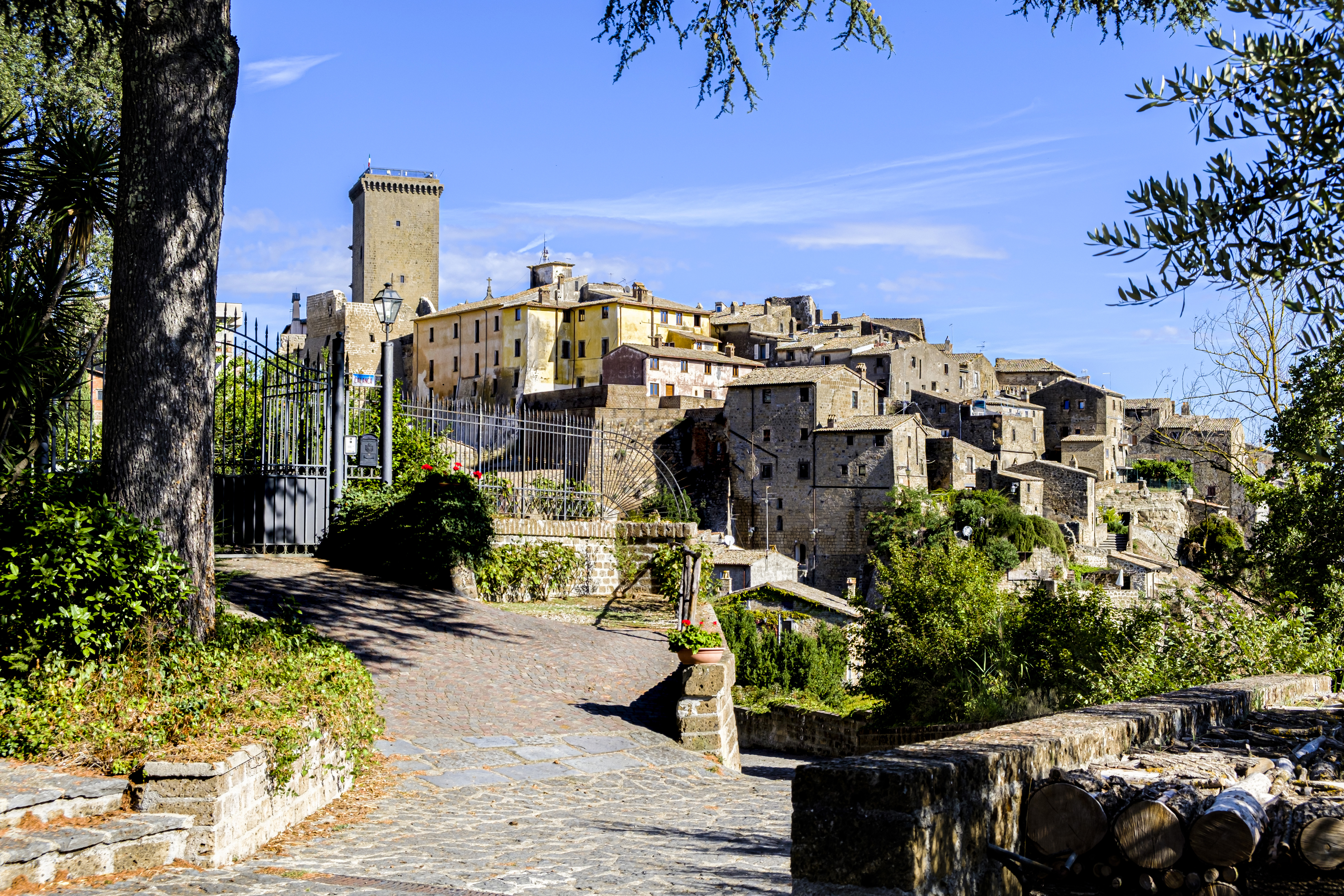

- Coat of arms

- Location within Italy Location within Lazio
- Coordinates: 42°36′N 12°11′E
- Country: Italy
- Region: Lazio
- Province: Viterbo (VT)
- Frazioni: San Michele in Teverina, San Sebastiano, Spoletino, Pian della Breccia, Case nuove

Government
  - Mayor: Giuseppe Mottura

Area
  - Total: 32.96 km^{2} (12.73 sq mi)
- Elevation: 262 m (860 ft)

Population (30 June 2017)
  - Total: 1,572
  - Density: 47.69/km^{2} (123.5/sq mi)
- Demonym: Civitellesi
- Time zone: UTC+1 (CET)
  - Summer (DST): UTC+2 (CEST)
- Postal code: 01020
- Dialing code: 0761
- Patron saint: St. Gorgonius
- Saint day: September 9
- Website: Official website

Civitella d'Agliano is a comune (municipality) in the Province of Viterbo in the Italian region of Latium, located about 80 kilometres (50 mi) northwest of Rome and about 20 kilometres (12 mi) northeast of Viterbo.

Civitella d'Agliano borders the following municipalities: Alviano, Bagnoregio, Castiglione in Teverina, Graffignano, Guardea, Montecchio, Orvieto, Viterbo.
