= Nespolo =

- Comune
- Comune di Nespolo
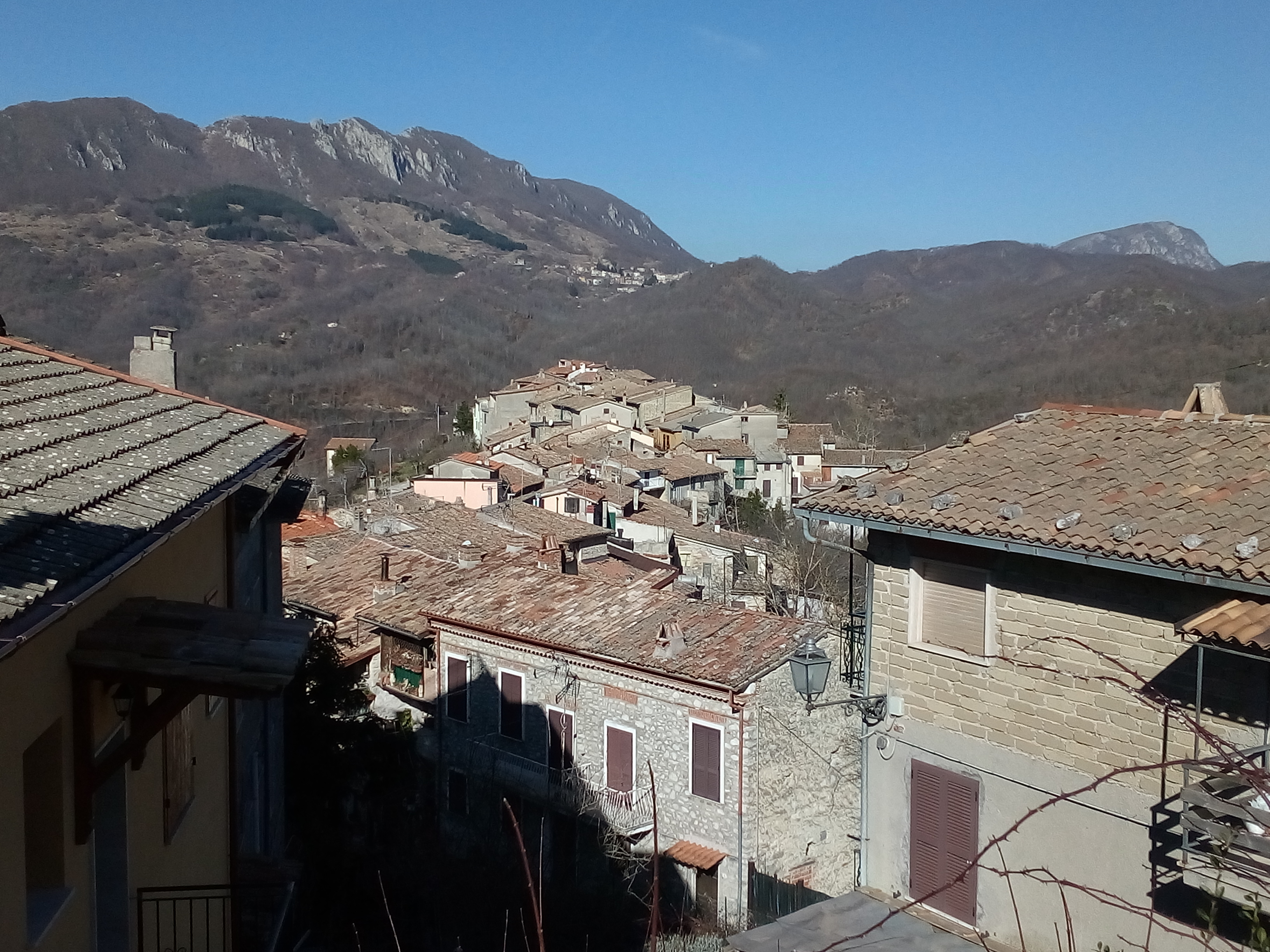
- View of Nespolo

- Coat of arms

- Location within Italy Location within Lazio
- Coordinates: 42°9′N 13°4′E
- Country: Italy
- Region: Lazio
- Province: Rieti (RI)

Government
  - Mayor: Giuseppe Angelini

Area
  - Total: 8.6 km^{2} (3.3 sq mi)
- Elevation: 886 m (2,907 ft)

Population (2008)
  - Total: 287
  - Density: 33/km^{2} (86/sq mi)
- Demonym: Nespolesi
- Time zone: UTC+1 (CET)
  - Summer (DST): UTC+2 (CEST)
- Postal code: 02020
- Dialing code: 0765
- Website: https://www.comunedinespolo.it

Nespolo (Sabino: Nespru) is a comune (municipality) in the Province of Rieti in the Italian region of Lazio. It is located about 50 kilometres (31 mi) northeast of Rome and about 30 kilometres (19 mi) southeast of Rieti.

Nespolo borders the municipalities of Carsoli and Collalto Sabino.

Nespolo is a rural community, with an economy originally based on farming and chestnut orchards, and has a population of 281. The town sits on a mountain ridge and extends over a half circle shape. Its origins date back to the 14th century, somewhere between 1350 and 1400 when a number of scattered populations of the area joined together into a village proper, mainly for defense purpose.

The town is composed of two distinct sections, the Colle di qua ("Hill on this side") facing north, and the Colle di là ("Hill on that side") facing west, probably two distinct settlements each headed by a leading strong family. The town church, built oh a high point between the two sections was founded in 1357 and renovated in 1521.

Since the high part of town is known as Castelluccio, it is possible that it may have been the site of a small castle likely built by the nearby lords of Collalto who presided over the territory.
