= Paganico Sabino =

- Comune
- Comune di Paganico Sabino
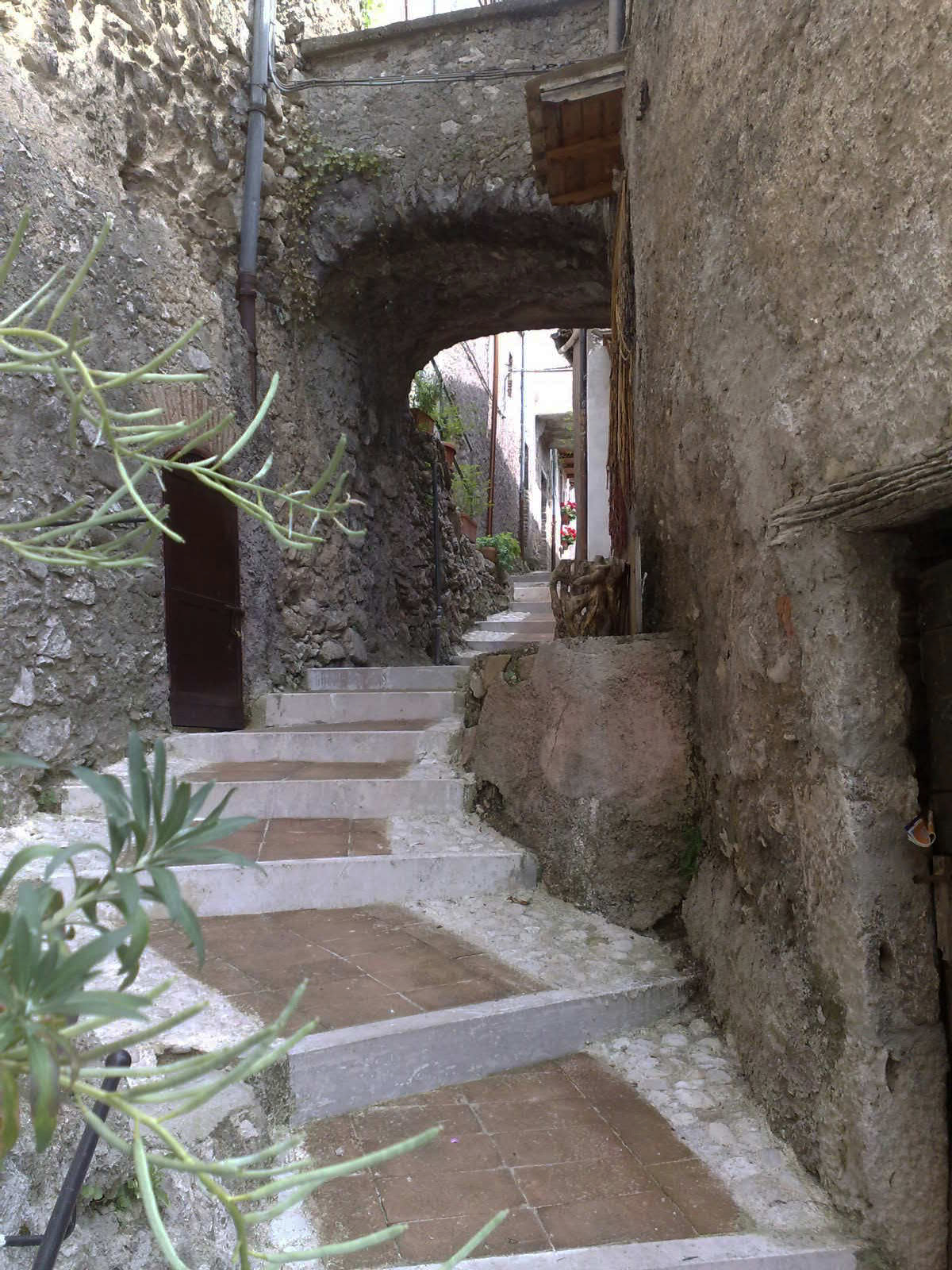
- View of Paganico Sabino

- Location within Italy Location within Lazio
- Coordinates: 42°11′N 12°59′E
- Country: Italy
- Region: Lazio
- Province: Rieti (RI)

Government
  - Mayor: Danilo D'Ignazi

Area
  - Total: 9.31 km^{2} (3.59 sq mi)
- Elevation: 720 m (2,360 ft)

Population (31 December 2017)
  - Total: 166
  - Density: 17.8/km^{2} (46.2/sq mi)
- Time zone: UTC+1 (CET)
  - Summer (DST): UTC+2 (CEST)
- Postal code: 02020
- Dialing code: 0765
- Website: Official website

Paganico Sabino is a comune (municipality) in the Province of Rieti in the Italian region of Latium, located about 50 kilometres (31 mi) northeast of Rome and about 25 kilometres (16 mi) southeast of Rieti.

Paganico Sabino borders the following municipalities: Ascrea, Collegiove, Marcetelli, Pozzaglia Sabina, Varco Sabino.
