= Pescorocchiano =

- Comune
- Comune di Pescorocchiano
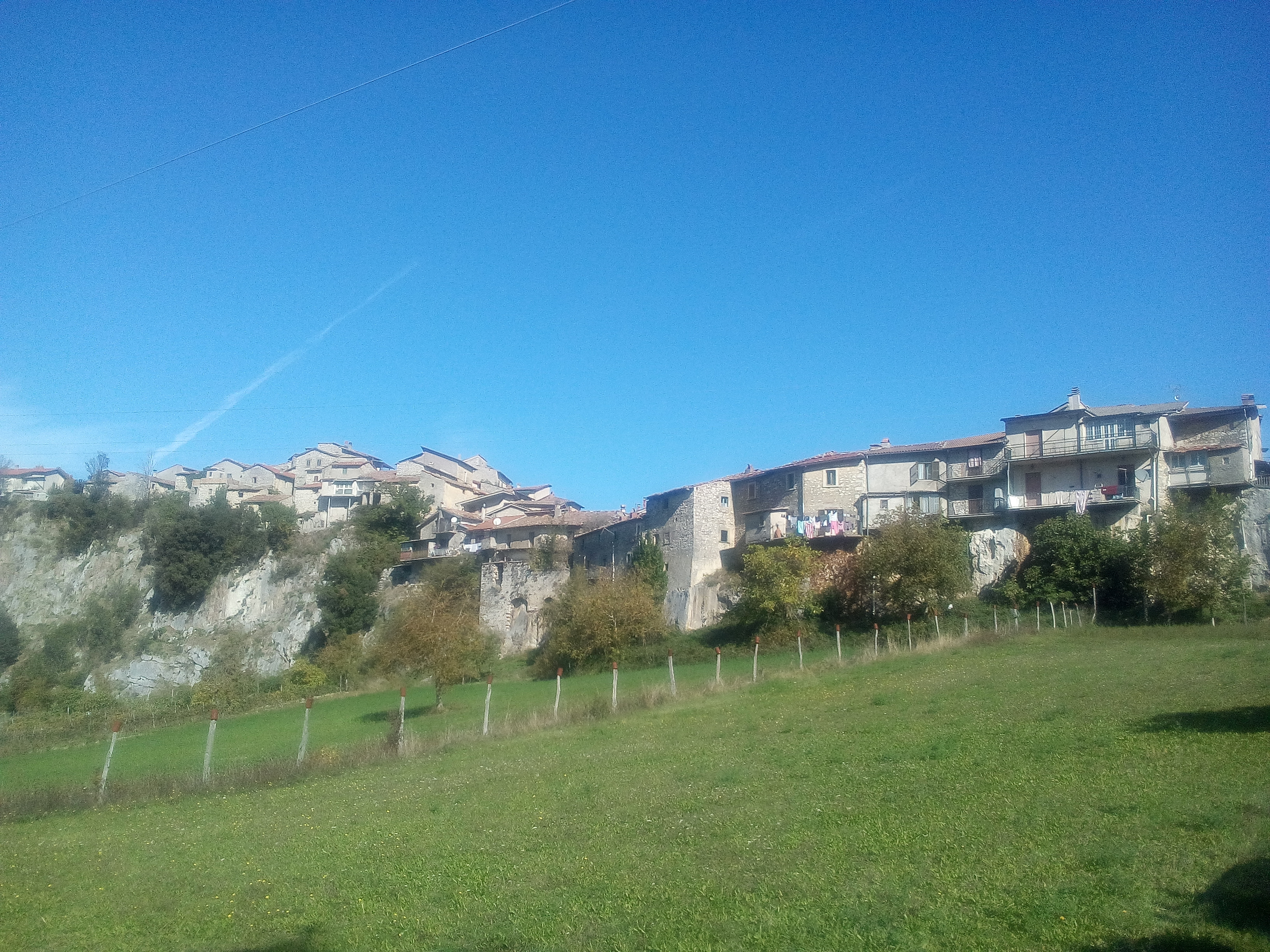
- View of Pescorocchiano

- Coat of arms

- Location within Italy Location within Lazio
- Coordinates: 42°12′N 13°9′E
- Country: Italy
- Region: Lazio
- Province: Rieti (RI)
- Frazioni: Alzano, Castelluccio Baccarecce, Castagneta, Civitella di Nesce, Colle di Pace, Girgenti, Granara, Leofreni, Nesce, Pace, Petrignano, Poggio San Giovanni, Roccaberardi, Roccarandisi, Santa Lucia di Gioverotondo, Sant'Elpidio, Torre di Taglio, Val de' Varri

Government
  - Mayor: Mario Gregori

Area
  - Total: 94.78 km^{2} (36.59 sq mi)
- Elevation: 806 m (2,644 ft)

Population (31 March 2018)
  - Total: 2,031
  - Density: 21.43/km^{2} (55.50/sq mi)
- Demonym: Pescorocchianesi
- Time zone: UTC+1 (CET)
  - Summer (DST): UTC+2 (CEST)
- Postal code: 02024
- Dialing code: 0746
- Patron saint: St. Andrew the Apostle
- Saint day: 30 November
- Website: Official website

Pescorocchiano (Sabino: U Pesc'hu) is a comune (municipality) in the Province of Rieti in the Italian region of Latium, located about 60 kilometres (37 mi) northeast of Rome and about 30 kilometres (19 mi) southeast of Rieti.

Pescorocchiano borders the following municipalities: Borgorose, Carsoli, Collalto Sabino, Fiamignano, Marcetelli, Petrella Salto, Sante Marie, Tornimparte, Varco Sabino. It is located not far from the Lago del Salto and is a typical agricultural municipality, renowned for the production of chestnut. The frazione (separated hamlet) of Civitella di Nesce, was most likely the seat of the Res publica Aequiculorum, an ancient Roman municipium in the former territory of the Aequi.
