= Collegiove =

- Comune
- Comune di Collegiove
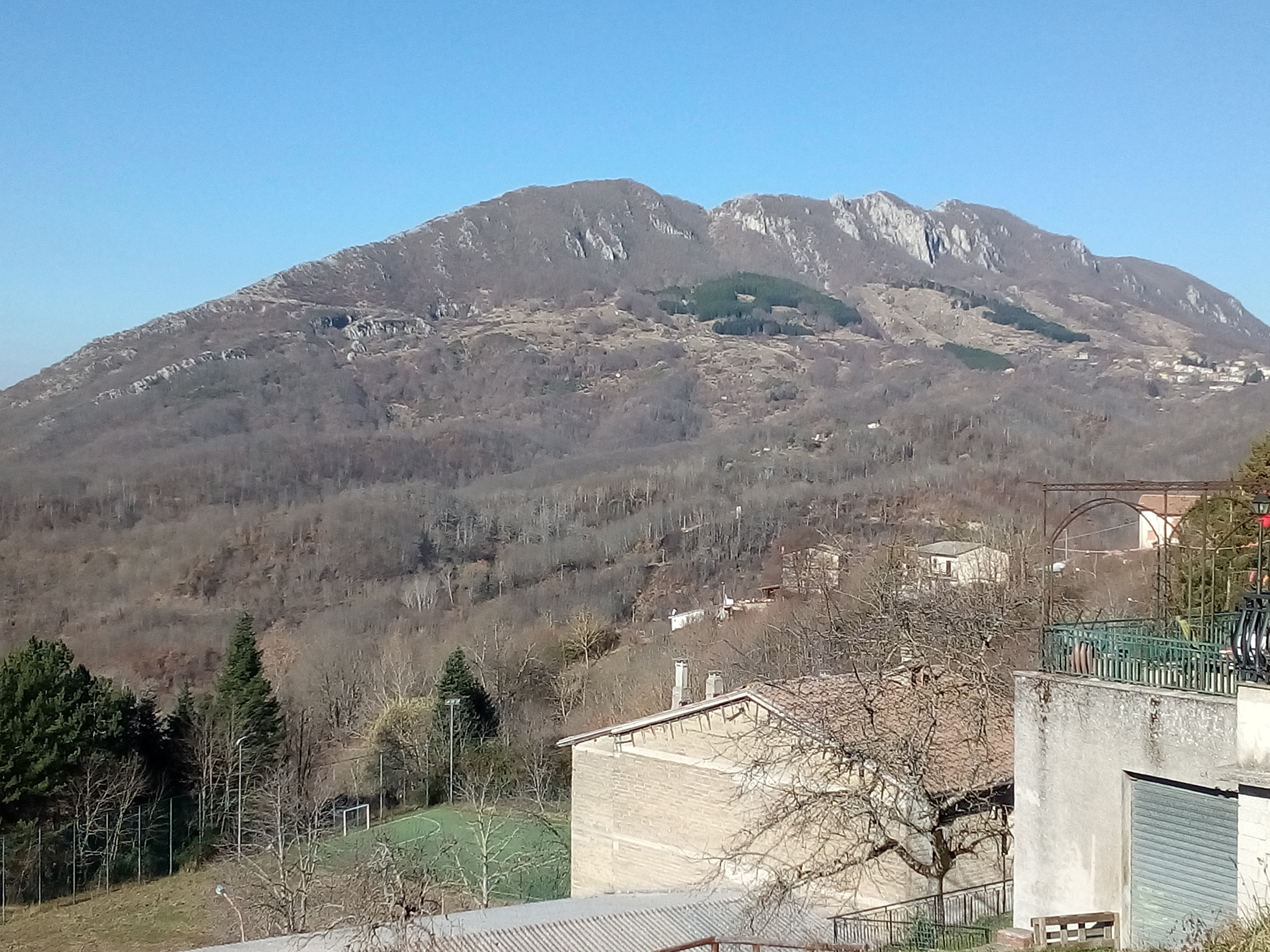
- View of Collegiove

- Location within Italy Location within Lazio
- Coordinates: 42°11′N 13°2′E
- Country: Italy
- Region: Lazio
- Province: Rieti (RI)

Government
  - Mayor: Domenico Manzocchi

Area
  - Total: 10.7 km^{2} (4.1 sq mi)
- Elevation: 1,001 m (3,284 ft)

Population (30 June 2017)
  - Total: 189
  - Density: 17.7/km^{2} (45.7/sq mi)
- Demonym: Collegiovesi
- Time zone: UTC+1 (CET)
  - Summer (DST): UTC+2 (CEST)
- Postal code: 02020
- Dialing code: 0765
- Website: Official website

Collegiove is a comune (municipality) in the Province of Rieti in the Italian region of Latium, located about 50 kilometres (31 mi) northeast of Rome and about 30 kilometres (19 mi) southeast of Rieti.

Collegiove borders the following municipalities: Ascrea, Collalto Sabino, Marcetelli, Paganico Sabino, Pozzaglia Sabina, Turania.
