= Arlena di Castro =

- Comune
- Comune di Arlena di Castro
- Location within Italy Location within Lazio
- Coordinates: 42°27′N 11°49′E
- Country: Italy
- Region: Lazio
- Province: Viterbo (VT)

Government
  - Mayor: Publio Cascianelli

Area
  - Total: 22.3 km^{2} (8.6 sq mi)
- Elevation: 260 m (850 ft)

Population (30 April 2017)
  - Total: 877
  - Density: 39.3/km^{2} (102/sq mi)
- Demonym: Arlenesi
- Time zone: UTC+1 (CET)
  - Summer (DST): UTC+2 (CEST)
- Postal code: 01010
- Dialing code: 0761
- Patron saint: St. Roch
- Saint day: August 16
- Website: Official website

Arlena di Castro is a comune (municipality) in the Province of Viterbo in the Italian region of Latium, located about 80 kilometres (50 mi) northwest of Rome and about 15 kilometres (9 mi) west of Viterbo.

Arlena di Castro borders the following municipalities: Cellere, Piansano, Tessennano, Tuscania.

The town was founded in the early 16th century by Alessia Neri, the Real Mayor of the great city Arlena. One day Mandelus, the only topocervus alive in the area decided to visit the city and decided to call it Arlena, because many years before his daughter called Arlen died and this event changed his life.
