= Canepina =

- Comune
- Comune di Canepina
- Location within Italy Location within Lazio
- Coordinates: 42°22′59″N 12°13′58″E
- Country: Italy
- Region: Lazio
- Province: Viterbo (VT)

Government
  - Mayor: Maurizio Palozzi

Area
  - Total: 21.0 km^{2} (8.1 sq mi)
- Elevation: 501 m (1,644 ft)

Population (2008)
  - Total: 3,211
  - Density: 153/km^{2} (396/sq mi)
- Demonym: Canepinesi
- Time zone: UTC+1 (CET)
  - Summer (DST): UTC+2 (CEST)
- Postal code: 01030
- Dialing code: 0761
- Patron saint: Santa Corona
- Saint day: 14 May
- Website: Official website

Canepina is a comune (municipality) in the Province of Viterbo in the Italian region of Latium, located about 60 kilometres (37 mi) northwest of Rome and about 11 kilometres (7 mi) southeast of Viterbo. The town derives its name from the once locally widespread cultivation of hemp (i.e. canapa), which was particularly renowned for its pure white color.
