= Spigno Saturnia =

- Comune
- Comune di Spigno Saturnia
- Coat of arms

- Location within Italy Location within Lazio
- Coordinates: 41°18′N 13°44′E
- Country: Italy
- Region: Lazio
- Province: Latina (LT)
- Frazioni: Campodivivo, Santo Stefano, Piscinola, Capodacqua

Government
  - Mayor: Salvatore Vento (Civic list)

Area
  - Total: 38 km^{2} (15 sq mi)
- Elevation: 51 m (167 ft)

Population (31 March 2015)
  - Total: 2,963
  - Density: 78/km^{2} (200/sq mi)
- Demonym: Spignesi
- Time zone: UTC+1 (CET)
  - Summer (DST): UTC+2 (CEST)
- Postal code: 04020
- Dialing code: 0771
- Website: Official website

Spigno Saturnia is a town and comune in the province of Latina, in the Lazio region of central Italy.

Medieval Spinium, which had its own counts in the Norman period, corresponds to the frazione of Spigno Vecchio.

== Origin of name ==
The toponym "Spigno" derives from the spread over the territory of two thorny plants, the hawthorn and the wild plum, and from the fact that the latter was used with its thorns by the Spigno inhabitants to make fences.
