= Turania =

- Comune
- Comune di Turania
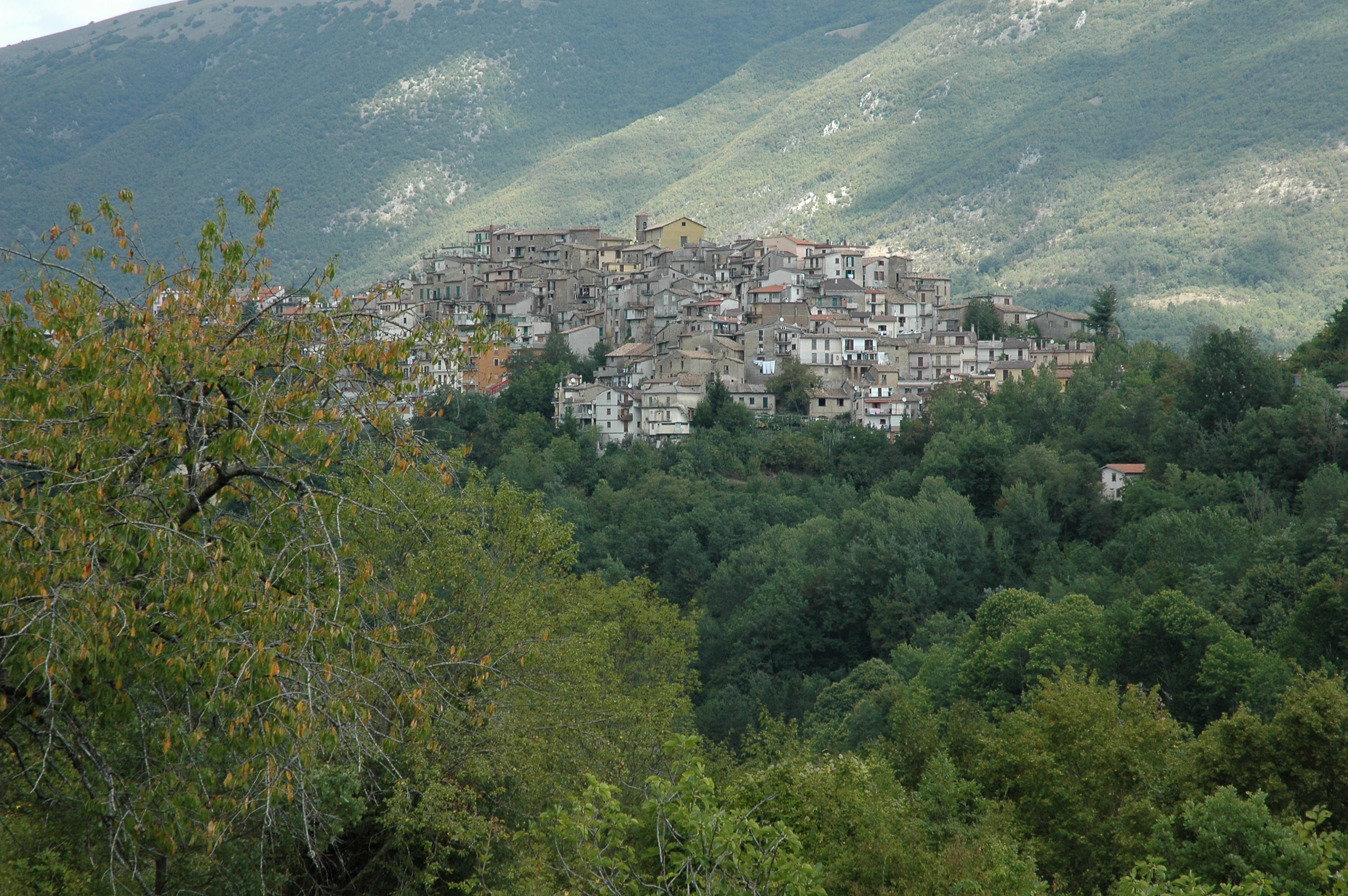
- View of Turania

- Location within Italy Location within Lazio
- Coordinates: 42°8′N 13°1′E
- Country: Italy
- Region: Lazio
- Province: Rieti (RI)

Government
  - Mayor: Roberto Proietti

Area
  - Total: 8.6 km^{2} (3.3 sq mi)
- Elevation: 703 m (2,306 ft)

Population (31 December 2012)
  - Total: 236
  - Density: 27/km^{2} (71/sq mi)
- Time zone: UTC+1 (CET)
  - Summer (DST): UTC+2 (CEST)
- Postal code: 02020
- Dialing code: 0765

Turania is a comune (municipality) in the Province of Rieti in the Italian region of Latium, located about 50 kilometres (31 mi) northeast of Rome and about 30 kilometres (19 mi) southeast of Rieti.

Turania borders the following municipalities: Carsoli, Collalto Sabino, Collegiove, Pozzaglia Sabina, Vivaro Romano.
