= Vallinfreda =

- Comune
- Comune di Vallinfreda
- Coat of arms

- Location within Italy Location within Lazio
- Coordinates: 42°5′N 12°58′E
- Country: Italy
- Region: Lazio
- Metropolitan city: Rome (RM)

Government
  - Mayor: Filippo Sturabotti

Area
  - Total: 16.72 km^{2} (6.46 sq mi)
- Elevation: 870 m (2,850 ft)

Population (31 August 2020)
  - Total: 290
  - Density: 17/km^{2} (45/sq mi)
- Demonym: Vallinfredani
- Time zone: UTC+1 (CET)
  - Summer (DST): UTC+2 (CEST)
- Postal code: 00020
- Dialing code: 0774
- Website: Official website

Vallinfreda is a comune (municipality) in the Metropolitan City of Rome in the Italian region Lazio, located approximately 45 kilometres (28 mi) northeast of Rome.
