= Graffignano =

- Comune
- Comune di Graffignano
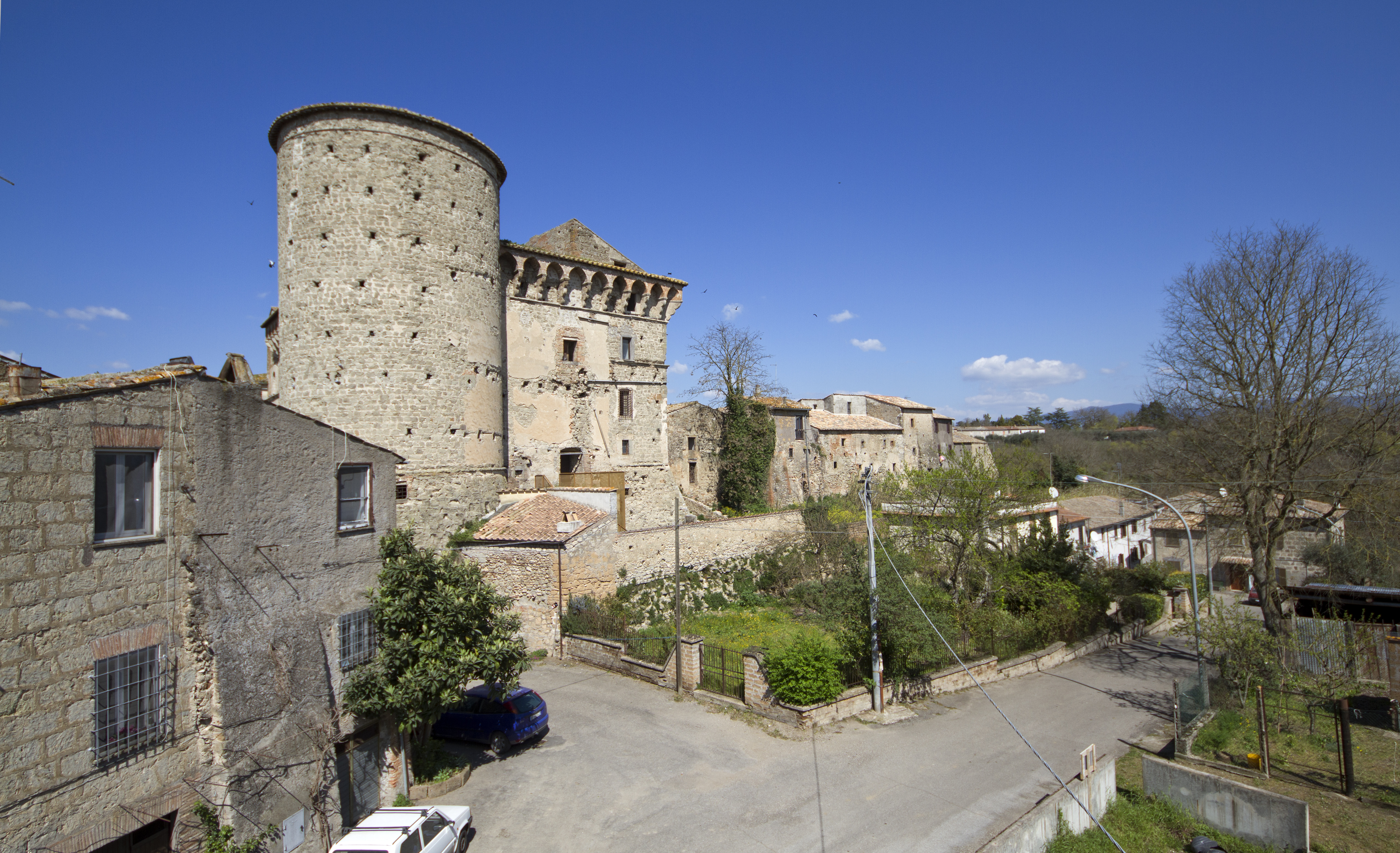

- Location within Italy Location within Lazio
- Coordinates: 42°34′N 12°12′E
- Country: Italy
- Region: Lazio
- Province: Viterbo (VT)
- Frazioni: Sipicciano, Tardani, Pisciarello

Government
  - Mayor: Anselmo Uzzoletti

Area
  - Total: 29.1 km^{2} (11.2 sq mi)
- Elevation: 187 m (614 ft)

Population (31 August 2017)
  - Total: 2,211
  - Density: 76.0/km^{2} (197/sq mi)
- Demonym: Graffignanesi
- Time zone: UTC+1 (CET)
  - Summer (DST): UTC+2 (CEST)
- Postal code: 01020
- Dialing code: 0761
- Website: Official website

Graffignano is a comune (municipality) in the Province of Viterbo in the Italian region of Latium, located about 80 kilometres (50 mi) northwest of Rome and about 20 kilometres (12 mi) northeast of Viterbo.

Graffignano borders the following municipalities: Alviano, Attigliano, Bomarzo, Civitella d'Agliano, Lugnano in Teverina, Viterbo.

Sights include the Baglioni Castle (13th century), church of San Martino Vescovo.
