= Villa San Giovanni in Tuscia =

- Comune
- Comune di Villa San Giovanni in Tuscia
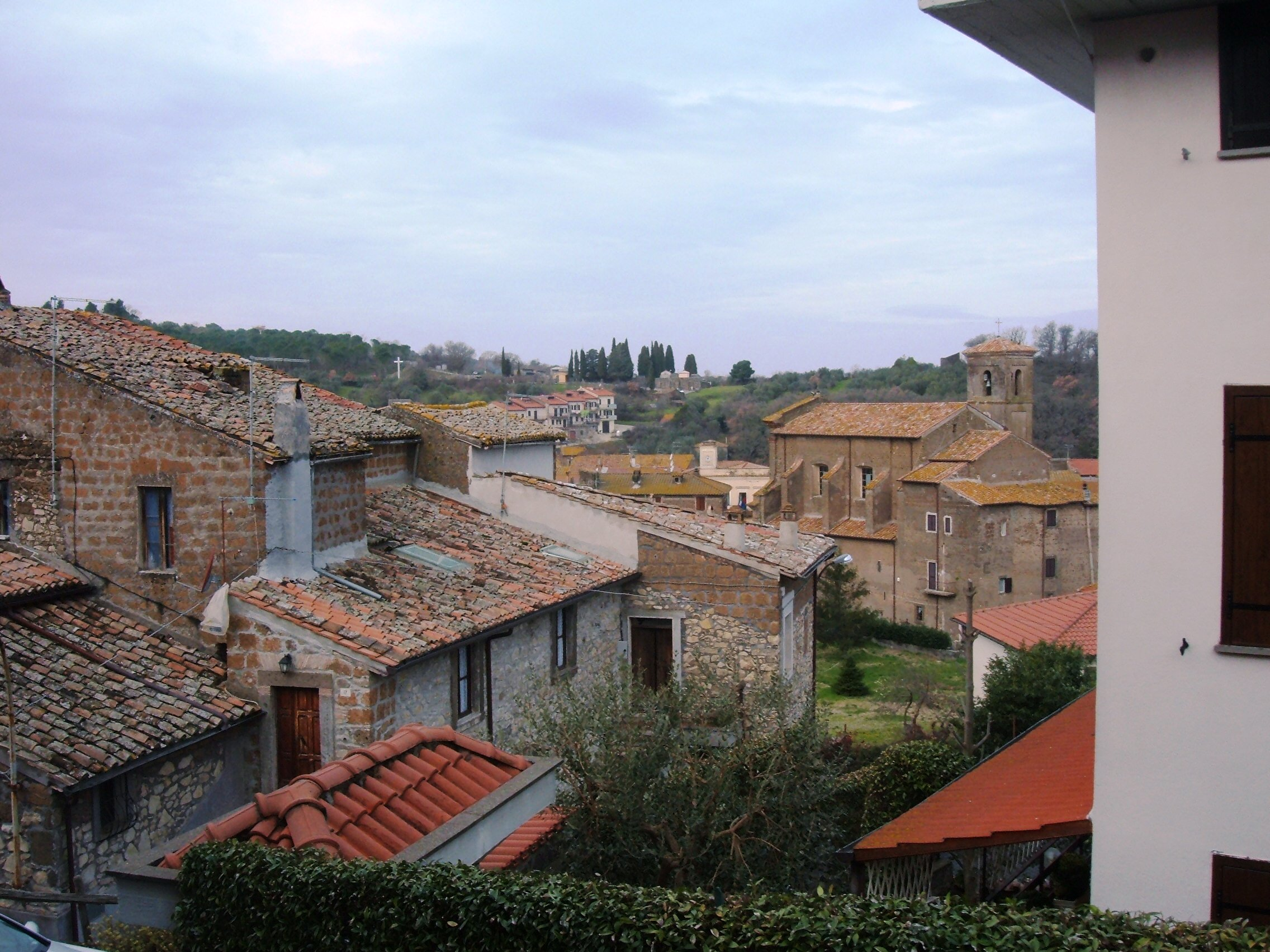

- Coat of arms

- Location within Italy Location within Lazio
- Coordinates: 42°16′N 12°3′E
- Country: Italy
- Region: Lazio
- Province: Viterbo (VT)

Government
  - Mayor: Fabio Latini

Area
  - Total: 5.3 km^{2} (2.0 sq mi)
- Elevation: 329 m (1,079 ft)

Population (31 December 2012)
  - Total: 1,305
  - Density: 250/km^{2} (640/sq mi)
- Demonym: Sangiovannesi
- Time zone: UTC+1 (CET)
  - Summer (DST): UTC+2 (CEST)
- Postal code: 01010
- Dialing code: 0761
- Patron saint: St. John the Baptist
- Saint day: First Sunday in August
- Website: Official website

Villa San Giovanni in Tuscia is a comune (municipality) in the Province of Viterbo in the Italian region of Latium, located about 60 kilometres (37 miles) northwest of Rome and about 15 km (9 mi) southwest of Viterbo.

Villa San Giovanni in Tuscia borders the following municipalities: Barbarano Romano, Blera, Vetralla.
