= Santi Cosma e Damiano, Lazio =

Santi Cosma e Damiano
- Comune
- Comune di Santi Cosma e Damiano
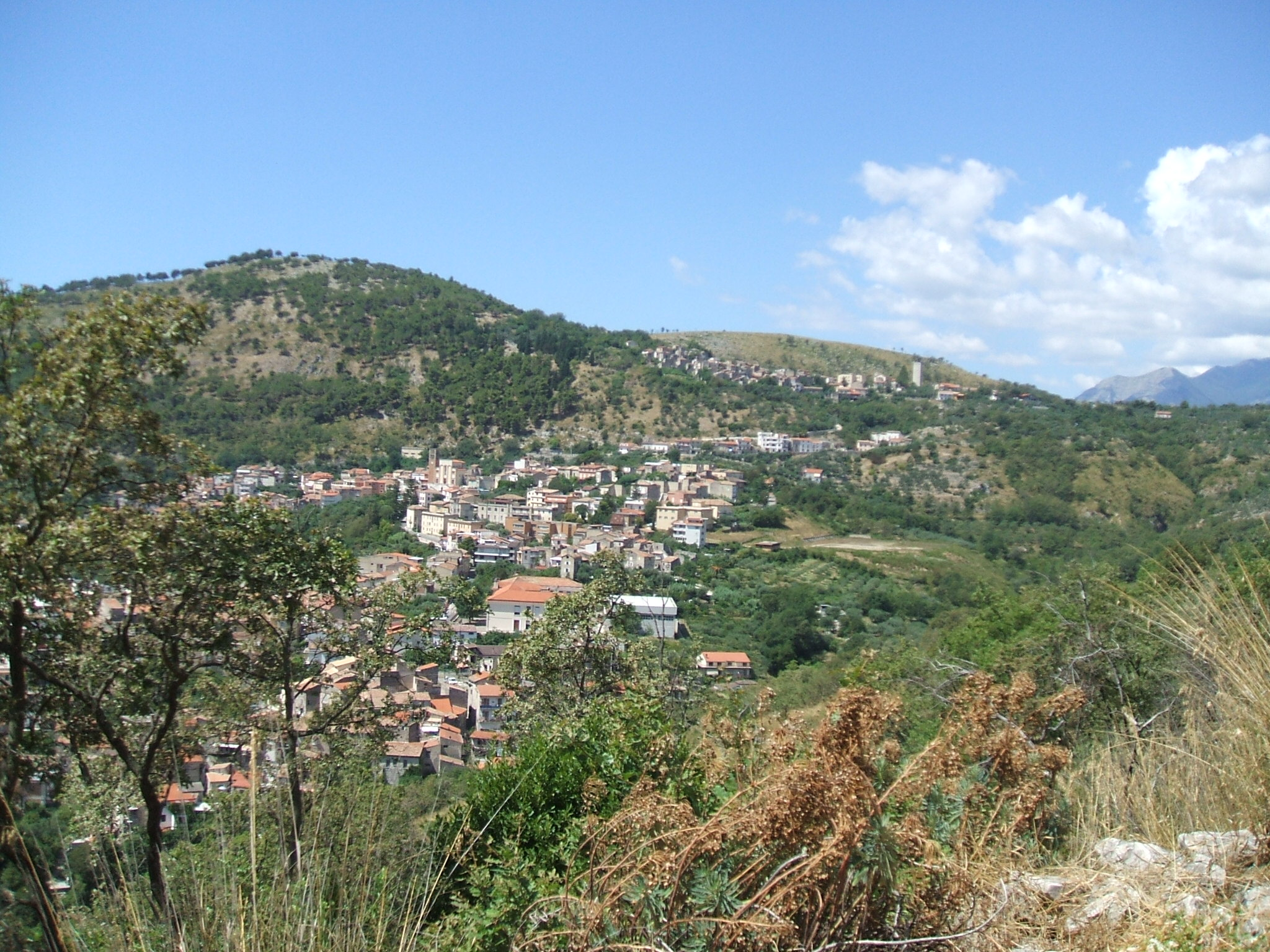
- View of Santi Cosma e Damiano

- Coat of arms

- Location within Italy Location within Lazio
- Coordinates: 41°18′N 13°49′E
- Country: Italy
- Region: Lazio
- Province: Latina (LT)
- Frazioni: Cerri Aprano, Grunuovo, San Lorenzo, Ventosa

Government
  - Mayor: Franco Taddeo

Area
  - Total: 31.61 km^{2} (12.20 sq mi)
- Elevation: 181 m (594 ft)

Population (30 June 2017)
  - Total: 6,967
  - Density: 220.4/km^{2} (570.8/sq mi)
- Demonym: Sancosemesi
- Time zone: UTC+1 (CET)
  - Summer (DST): UTC+2 (CEST)
- Postal code: 04020
- Dialing code: 0771
- ISTAT code: 059026
- Patron saint: Sts. Cosmas and Damian
- Saint day: September 26
- Website: Official website

Santi Cosma e Damiano is a town and comune in the province of Latina, in the Lazio region of central Italy, whose territory is located partly in the Monti Aurunci area and partly in the Garigliano plain.

Sights include an 11th-century tower in the frazione of Ventosa.

== Geography ==
The municipality is part of the Mountain Community Zone XVII of the Aurunci Mountains; it is located partly on one of the hilly slopes of the mountains and partly in the Garigliano plain, in the south-eastern area of the Province of Latina; it borders to the east with the Province of Frosinone and is separated from Minturno by the Ausente river and from Campania by the Garigliano river.

== History ==
It is mentioned for the first time in a Gaetan document from 830 AD, although the area was inhabited in ancient times by the Ausoni/Aurunci (nearby was the ancient town of Vescia).

Here, in the locality known as Vattaglia (local dialect for "battle"), was fought in 915 the Battle of Garigliano between the Italian league and the Saracens. After the battle the place was part of the Duchy of Gaeta, then of the Montecassino Abbey until the Norman conquest in 1140, after which it followed the history of the Kingdom of Naples.

During World War II, Santi Cosma e Damiano was located on the Gustav Line, and therefore suffered heavy bombings in 1943–44.
