= Rocca Massima =

- Comune
- Comune di Rocca Massima
- Coat of arms

- Location within Italy Location within Lazio
- Coordinates: 41°41′N 12°55′E
- Country: Italy
- Region: Lazio
- Province: Latina (LT)

Government
  - Mayor: Mario Lucarelli (Civic list)

Area
  - Total: 18.1 km^{2} (7.0 sq mi)
- Elevation: 735 m (2,411 ft)

Population (30 June 2016)
  - Total: 1,136
  - Density: 62.8/km^{2} (163/sq mi)
- Demonym: Rocchiggiani or Roccheggiani
- Time zone: UTC+1 (CET)
  - Summer (DST): UTC+2 (CEST)
- Postal code: 04010
- Dialing code: 06
- Patron saint: St. Michael Archangel
- Website: Official website

Rocca Massima is a comune (municipality) in the Province of Latina in the Italian region Lazio, located about 40 kilometres (25 mi) southeast of Rome and about 25 kilometres (16 mi) north of Latina, in the Monti Lepini area.
