= Piansano =

- Comune
- Comune di Piansano
- Location within Italy Location within Lazio
- Coordinates: 42°31′N 11°49′E
- Country: Italy
- Region: Lazio
- Province: Province of Viterbo (VT)

Government
  - Mayor: Roseo Melaragni (since June 2004 - Second mandate)

Area
  - Total: 26.5 km^{2} (10.2 sq mi)
- Elevation: 409 m (1,342 ft)

Population (31 December 2004)
  - Total: 2,232
  - Density: 84.2/km^{2} (218/sq mi)
- Demonym: Piansanesi
- Time zone: UTC+1 (CET)
  - Summer (DST): UTC+2 (CEST)
- Postal code: 01010
- Dialing code: 0761
- Patron saint: St. Bernardino of Siena
- Saint day: May 20
- Website: Official website

Piansano is a comune (municipality) in the Province of Viterbo in the Italian region of Latium, located about 90 kilometres (56 mi) northwest of Rome and about 25 kilometres (16 mi) northwest of Viterbo. As of 31 December 2004, it had a population of 2,232 and an area of 26.5 square kilometres (10.2 mi^{2}).

Piansano borders the following municipalities: Arlena di Castro, Capodimonte, Cellere, Tuscania, Valentano.

== Demographic evolution ==
Historical population

| Year | Pop. | ±% |
|---|---|---|
| 1861 | ? | — |
| 1871 | 1,894 | — |
| 1881 | 1,936 | +2.2% |
| 1901 | 2,175 | +12.3% |
| 1911 | 2,418 | +11.2% |

| Year | Pop. | ±% |
|---|---|---|
| 1921 | 2,563 | +6.0% |
| 1931 | 2,751 | +7.3% |
| 1936 | 2,834 | +3.0% |
| 1951 | 2,882 | +1.7% |
| 1961 | 2,486 | −13.7% |

| Year | Pop. | ±% |
|---|---|---|
| 1971 | 2,295 | −7.7% |
| 1981 | 2,337 | +1.8% |
| 1991 | 2,306 | −1.3% |
| 2001 | 2,220 | −3.7% |

Source: Data from ISTAT
