= Castiglione in Teverina =

- Comune
- Comune di Castiglione in Teverina
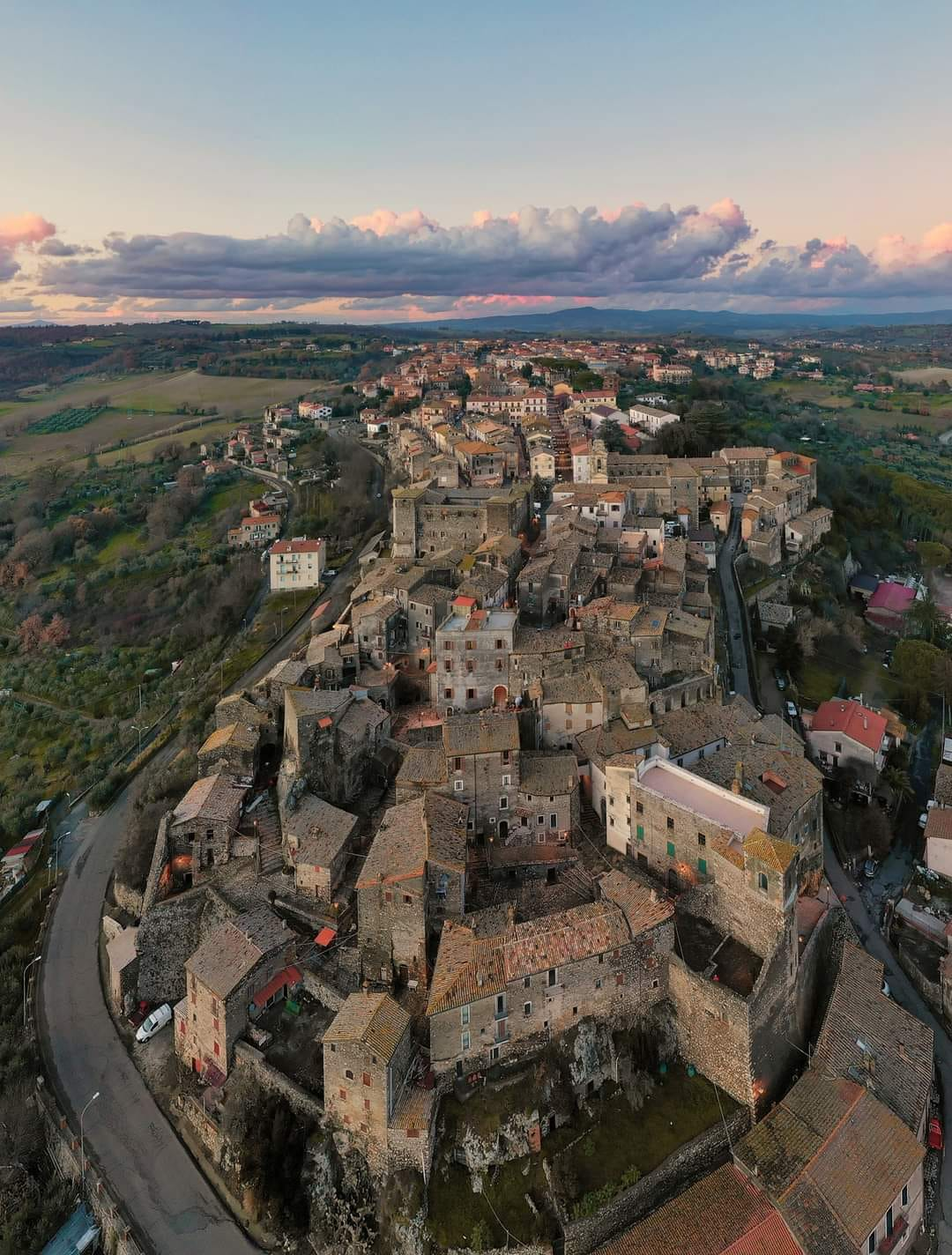

- Coat of arms

- Location within Italy Location within Lazio
- Coordinates: 42°38′N 12°12′E
- Country: Italy
- Region: Lazio
- Province: Viterbo (VT)
- Frazioni: Sermugnano, Vaiano

Government
  - Mayor: Mirco Luzi

Area
  - Total: 19.89 km^{2} (7.68 sq mi)
- Elevation: 228 m (748 ft)

Population (30 June 2017)
  - Total: 2,315
  - Density: 116.4/km^{2} (301.4/sq mi)
- Demonym: Castiglionesi
- Time zone: UTC+1 (CET)
  - Summer (DST): UTC+2 (CEST)
- Postal code: 01024
- Dialing code: 0761
- Patron saint: Sts. Philip and James
- Saint day: May 3
- Website: Official website

Castiglione in Teverina is a comune (municipality) in the Province of Viterbo in the Italian region Lazio, located about 90 kilometres (56 mi) northwest of Rome and about 25 kilometres (16 mi) northeast of Viterbo.

== History ==
Castiglione is located in an area once settled by the Etruscans. The current town developed from around the year 1000 from a castle and, in 1351, it housed the inhabitants of the destroyed Paterno. It was a fief of the Monaldeschi della Cervara and of the Savelli families. Sold to the House of Farnese in 1539, it was part of the Duchy of Castro until 1637, when the citizens bought back their freedom for 20,000 ducats.

It remained part of the Papal States until 1870, when it was annexed to the newly unified Kingdom of Italy.

== Main sights ==
- Collegiata of Sts. Philip and James. It includes a late 15th-century baptistery
- Church of Madonna della Neve
- Museum of Wine
