= Concerviano =

- Comune
- Comune di Concerviano
- Coat of arms

- Location within Italy Location within Lazio
- Coordinates: 42°19′N 12°59′E
- Country: Italy
- Region: Lazio
- Province: Rieti (RI)
- Frazioni: Cenciara, Pratoianni, Vaccareccia

Government
  - Mayor: Pierluigi Buzzi

Area
  - Total: 21.39 km^{2} (8.26 sq mi)
- Elevation: 560 m (1,840 ft)

Population (30 June 2017)
  - Total: 277
  - Density: 12.9/km^{2} (33.5/sq mi)
- Demonym: Concervianesi
- Time zone: UTC+1 (CET)
  - Summer (DST): UTC+2 (CEST)
- Postal code: 02020
- Dialing code: 0765
- Patron saint: St. Nicholas
- Saint day: 6 December
- Website: Official website

Concerviano is a comune (municipality) in the Province of Rieti in the Italian region of Latium, located about 60 kilometres (37 mi) northeast of Rome and about 13 kilometres (8 mi) southeast of Rieti.

Its frazione Pratoianni is the site of the Benedictine Territorial Abbacy of San Salvatore Maggiore.
