= Tessennano =

- Comune
- Comune di Tessennano
- Location within Italy Location within Lazio
- Coordinates: 42°28′45″N 11°47′28″E
- Country: Italy
- Region: Lazio
- Province: Viterbo (VT)

Government
  - Mayor: Ermanno Nicolai

Area
  - Total: 14.65 km^{2} (5.66 sq mi)
- Elevation: 302 m (991 ft)

Population (31 December 2012)
  - Total: 336
  - Density: 22.9/km^{2} (59.4/sq mi)
- Demonym: Tessennanesi
- Time zone: UTC+1 (CET)
  - Summer (DST): UTC+2 (CEST)
- Postal code: 01010
- Dialing code: 0761
- Patron saint: San Felice
- Saint day: August 30

Tessennano is a comune (municipality) in the Province of Viterbo in the Italian region of Latium, located about 90 kilometres (56 mi) northwest of Rome and about 25 kilometres (16 mi) west of Viterbo.
