= Rocca Sinibalda =

- Comune
- Comune di Rocca Sinibalda
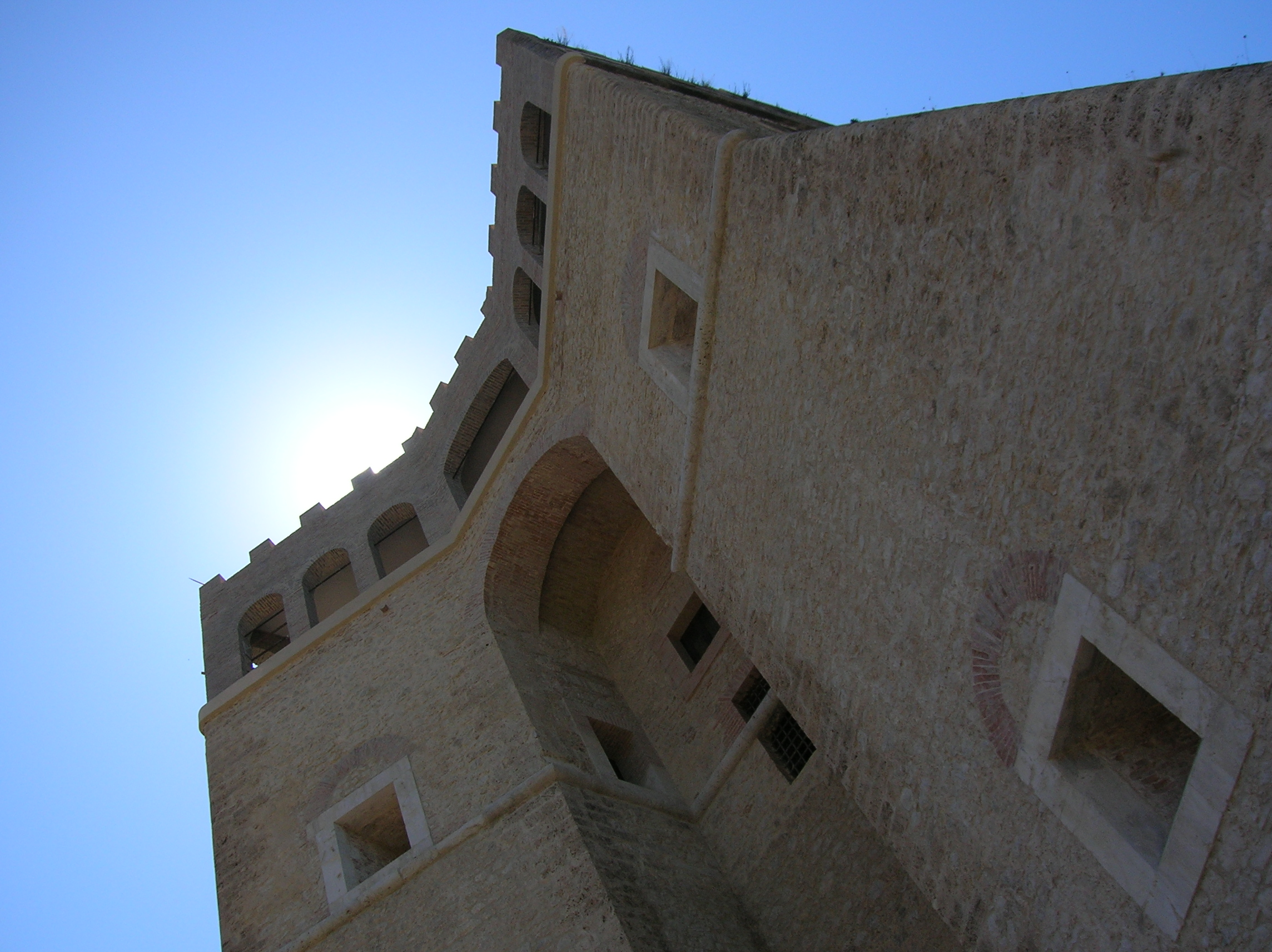
- The Sforza Cesarini Castle.

- Coat of arms

- Location within Italy Location within Lazio
- Coordinates: 42°16′28″N 12°55′32″E
- Country: Italy
- Region: Lazio
- Province: Rieti (RI)
- Frazioni: Magnalardo, Pantana, Posticciola, Tomassella, Torricchia, Trampani, Vallecupola

Government
  - Mayor: Stefano Micheli

Area
  - Total: 49.56 km^{2} (19.14 sq mi)
- Elevation: 552 m (1,811 ft)

Population (31 December 2010)
  - Total: 844
  - Density: 17.0/km^{2} (44.1/sq mi)
- Demonym: Rocchegiani
- Time zone: UTC+1 (CET)
  - Summer (DST): UTC+2 (CEST)
- Postal code: 02026
- Dialing code: 0765
- Website: Official website

Rocca Sinibalda is a comune (municipality) in the Province of Rieti in the Italian region Lazio, located about 50 kilometres (31 mi) northeast of Rome and about 15 kilometres (9 mi) southeast of Rieti.

It is home to the Sforza Cesarini Castle, built in 1084 and later transformed into a more modern fortress in the 1530s by Baldassare Peruzzi, commissioned by Cardinal Alessandro Cesarini. The interior has frescoes from the 17th and 18th centuries.

The remains of the ancient Sabine town of Trebula Mutusca are not far.
