= Monte Livata =

Mountain and ski resort in Lazio, Italy

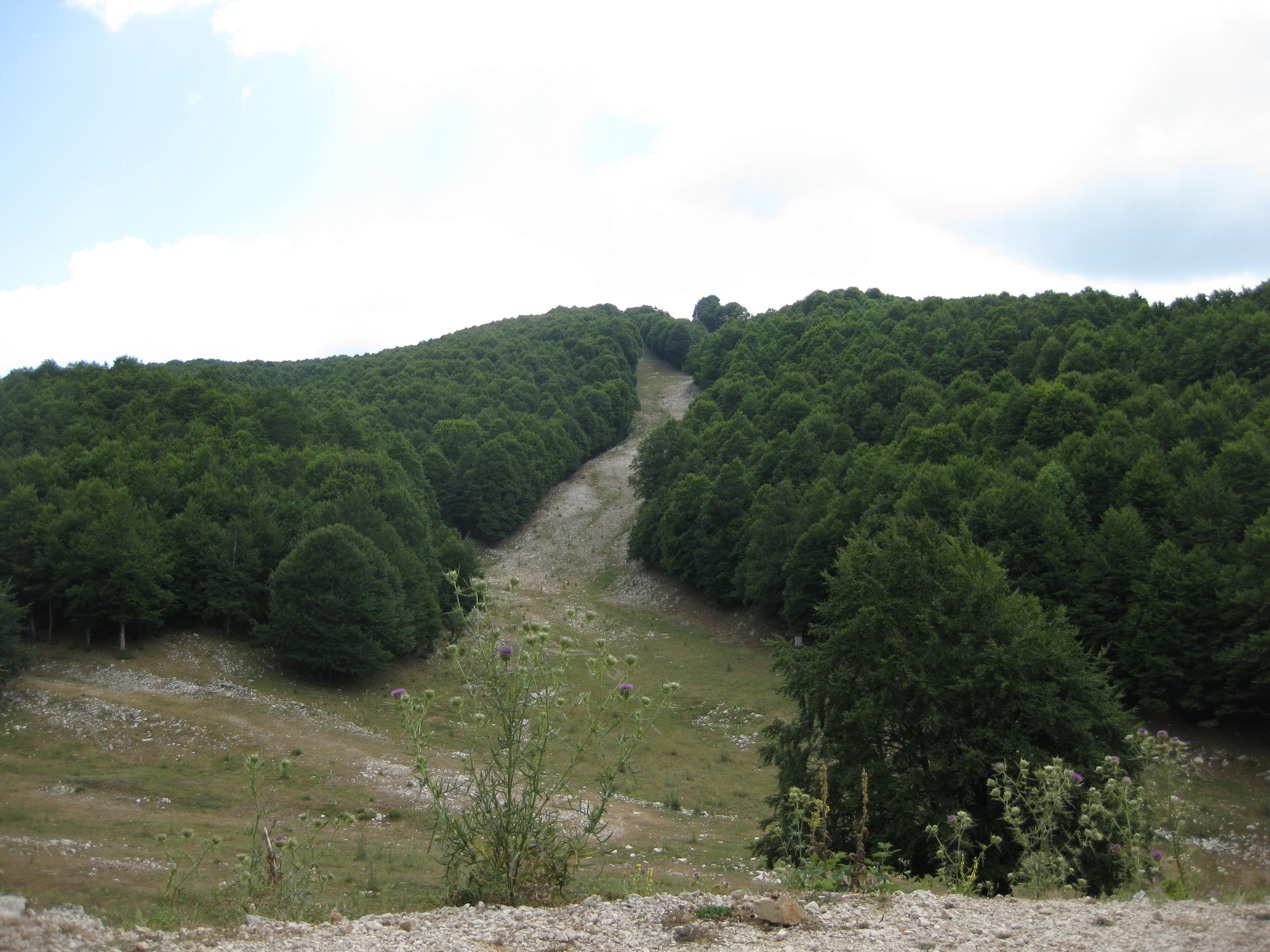
- View of the black slope of Monna dell’Orso

Highest point
- Elevation: 1,429 m (4,688 ft)
- Coordinates: 41°55′53″N 13°08′52″E

Geography
- Country: Italy
- Region: Lazio
- Parent range: Monti Simbruini (in the Lazio Subapennine)

The Monte Livata is a medium-altitude mountain (1,429 m (4,688 ft) a.s.l.) belonging to the Monti Simbruini range, in Lazio, in the Metropolitan City of Rome Capital, within the territory of the municipality of Subiaco, bordering the territories of the municipalities of Camerata Nuova, Cervara di Roma, Jenne, and Vallepietra. It hosts a ski resort, divided into two zones, among the most important in Lazio. The mountain is characterized by the presence of grazing animals, such as many buffaloes, cows, and horses.

== Description ==
Located not far from the border with Abruzzo, just 15 kilometers from Subiaco, the Livata resort extends over some 3,000 hectares in the Monti Simbruini Regional Natural Park, surrounded by the beech forests of the Monti Simbruini. Generally identified with the toponym Monte Livata, or simply Livata, it is divided internally into two districts or zones, all sharing the karstic nature of the terrain, but differing in altitude, vegetation, and level of human development:

- La Bandita, or Livata proper, located in the lower part of the territory at an altitude of approximately 1,350–1,425 m a.s.l., includes the areas of the Anello and the Valletta. Equipped with shops and services of all kinds (restaurants, bars, residences, hotels, sports and recreational equipment rentals, etc.), it offers various sports facilities, including a riding stable, tennis courts, a modern bike park/trial center, and a recently built rail toboggan run. It is also known for being the finish line of the Speata, a famous footrace that starts from Subiaco and reaches the summit of the Livata mountain. It is reachable by bus from Subiaco (Piazza Falcone) (Lazio regional transport service COTRAL), from which it is just 15 km away.
- Campo dell’Osso, located at an intermediate position, at about 1,560 m, includes the area of the Fossa dell’Acero. The area is crossed by the Viale dei boschi, the main road connecting Monte Livata to the ski facilities of Campo dell’Osso. The urban structure consists mainly of private residences, as well as a hiking refuge, a residence, a hotel (temporarily closed), two restaurants, a bar, a pizzeria, a sports equipment rental, and a church. After the boom in summer and winter tourism at Monte Livata in the 1960s, the area offers various sports facilities in need of modernization, including the "I Miceti" soccer field, a tennis court, and several ski facilities no longer in operation. In recent years, efforts have been made to use the Campo dell’Osso slopes with a travelator as a lift. In the 2012–2013 season, a cross-country skiing trail was opened, with a 10 km route immersed in the natural landscape of the Monti Simbruini, extending toward Vallepietra, where, in the summer season, trails lead to the Santuario della Santissima Trinità, a pilgrimage destination especially on the Sunday after Pentecost. The trails continue into Abruzzo, toward Camporotondo-Cappadocia-Tagliacozzo. Campo dell’Osso is also the starting point for snowshoeing to the SAIFAR refuge.

The municipality of Subiaco, on 26 June 1965, developed a "General Plan for the Development and Enhancement of the Municipal Mountain from Livata to Campo dell’Osso," obtaining authorization from the Ministry of Agriculture and Forests for the alienation and change of use of the civic domain lands (MAF decrees of 19 October 1959 and 21 October 1968). The General Development and Enhancement Plan was approved and regulated by the municipality of Subiaco with technical regulations outlined in resolution no. 55 of 30 June 1965 (see also: resolution no. 17 of 18 April 1966, concerning the extension and subdivision of Monte Livata-Campo dell’Osso; resolution of 29 April 1967, resolution of 15 May 1967 concerning the land use plan for the Monte Livata-Campo dell’Osso areas). The extent of this subdivision thus marks the boundary between the portion of parcel 15/p located within the “Livata-Campo dell’Osso” resort (1,429–1,560 m a.s.l.) and the portion of the same parcel corresponding to the different Monna dell’Orso area, located outside the resort’s boundaries, at a higher altitude (1,618–1,758 m a.s.l.).

- Monna dell’Orso (so-called La Monna), located in the summit area of the territory. In 2013, thanks to the joint efforts of the public and private sectors, the new Monna dell’Orso four-person chairlift was inaugurated, capable of transporting skiers, hikers, and visitors from 1,618 m to 1,758 m in altitude. At the departure station plaza, there are several buildings of various types and purposes, including: a chalet (Cafeteria Bistrot Restaurant) with an attached solarium, a recently built Bar-Rest Stop equipped with picnic tables, the ski/snowboard school, a sports equipment rental, a Forest Service post, a technical room, the chairlift control cabin, and ticket office, as well as a large garage for tracked vehicles and equipment.

Its user base is the lower province of Rome, along with the nearby Campo Staffi and Campocatino in the Frosinone area.

There are various opportunities for hiking in the forests up to Monte Calvo and Monte Autore; about 5 km away, it is possible to reach Campaegli (1,430 m a.s.l.), another tourist-mountain locality in the municipality of Cervara di Roma, while about 12 km from Monte Livata (Anello locality), the town of Subiaco is located, where it is possible to visit the Subiaco monasteries, open every day of the year.

== History ==
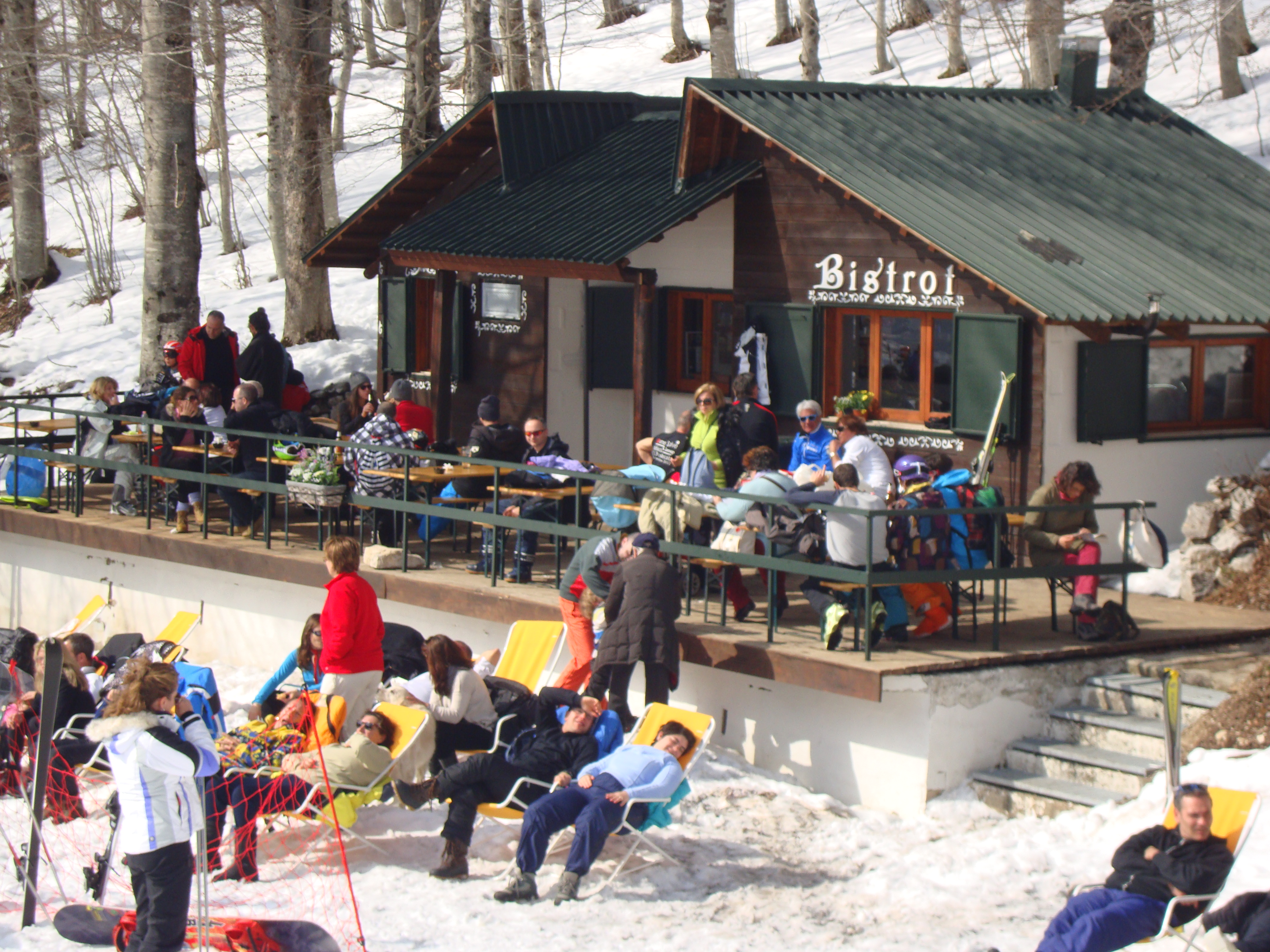
Monna dell’Orso Refuge

Until 1956, Monte Livata was reached on foot or by donkey or mule. In the same year, the drivable road, desired by the Subiaco administration and the then head of the Forestry Corps, was inaugurated; until that time, the place had been a destination for skiers who, thanks to the historic "Subiaco skiers’ group," founded in 1927, reached the mountain to engage in winter sports such as Nordic skiing, alpine skiing, and jumping. In 1957, the first cable lifts were built on the Bandita and Fascia hills, while in 1959, the first hotel structure was inaugurated: the Hotel Italia, built by Giacomo Orlandi, a pioneer of Livata mountain tourism.

In the following years, other local operators began commercial and mountain tourism activities: thanks to winter tourism and summer mountain tourism, many families from the “Rome elite” began to frequent Livata and built the first chalets in the Livata and Campo dell’Osso plains. Meanwhile, in 1965, the ski club Livata was established, with its first president, Filippo Morini, also a co-owner of the first cable lifts built on the Cesone, Fascia, Rotoli, Valletta, Fossa dell’Acero, and Monna dell’Orso hills. In 1965, at the Hotel Italia, the Rome education authority began organizing winter stays in the mountains for middle school students, who, in addition to studying, learned to ski under the guidance of ISEF professors.

In 1968, the first alpine ski school was established at the Hotel Italia, and thanks to the generosity of Giacomo Orlandi and the pro loco of Livata, ski instructors from Cortina d’Ampezzo were hired, forming the Italian F.I.S.I. school. The following year, in addition to the three Cortina instructors, two instructors from Predazzo joined, who were the founders of the Monte Livata Italian ski school of the "Guadagnini" brothers. Thanks to the efforts of these instructors, an important period of promoting alpine skiing in central-southern Italy began. Meanwhile, some Subiaco residents had also established an alpine ski school in Livata called "Cimon Della Pala.”

In 1975, the "SUBIACO" alpine ski school was founded, composed of F.I.S.I. ski instructors. Many students learned to ski at Monte Livata, and for years, "Roman schools" organized ski weeks in the hotels. Exceptions include the Pensione Genziana and the Hotel Italia, still managed by the Orlandi clan, now in its "fourth generation," descendants of "Giacomino ju Ricciu," a Livata pioneer.

The turning point for tourism came with the Livata 2001 SPA company, which in 1976 began building new ski lifts, replacing those made by previous operators in the Livata, Campo dell’Osso, and Monna dell’Orso resorts. Summer tourism effectively began in 1977, when Livata 2001 built the Anello sports center in the Monte Livata plain. Numerous alpine ski races have been held in Livata over the years, organized by ski clubs.

=== Decline and revival ===
From the early 1980s until the end of the millennium, for the Subiaco mountain, as for other Lazio ski resorts, a slow and inexorable decline began, mainly due to competition from Abruzzo ski resorts (Campo Felice, Ovindoli, Roccaraso), also easily accessible from Rome, equipped with modern and advanced slopes and facilities, compounded by the mismanagement of services (potable water and sewer connections are still lacking today). However, until 2008, the ski lift "La Monna dell’Orso" was in operation, offering visitors five alpine skiing slopes: Del Sole, Dell’Orso, Delle Signore, Nordica, and Topolino. Due to the expiration (repeatedly extended) of the concession, the ski lift had to close to make way for a chairlift, still in operation for tourists. Despite Livata 2001, now an LLC, having presented development projects for the Monna dell’Orso – Campominio ski resort over the years, currently blocked by environmental restrictions and vetoes (since 1983, the Livata resort is part of the Monti Simbruini Regional Natural Park) and recent unprofessional management by the same company, alpine skiing has effectively ceased.

Monte Livata, like all Lazio winter resorts, loses users because the regional environment department's policy has blocked the expansion of alpine skiing and ski areas, causing severe and irreparable damage to the economic and social fabric of Lazio's mountain territories. Livata no longer has ski lifts, as the last cable lifts at La Monna, the only true "attractors" generating reliable cash flows for the Subiaco mountain resort's economy, were closed in 2008. With the closure of the lifts, the alpine ski schools also shut down, and despite the many Subiaco ski instructors, nothing could be done. The latest generation of Subiaco alpine ski instructors now works in Abruzzo or the Alps, in Cortina d’Ampezzo and Madonna di Campiglio.

However, since the 2010s, there seems to be good news on several fronts:

1. At the meeting held among the mayor, entrepreneurs, and apartment owners (public meeting on 14 July 2013), it was reported that the materials from Leitner for the completion of the chairlift would arrive by the end of the month. The deadline was met, and after a brief summer break, assembly work resumed in late August, and the chairlift was inaugurated on 22 December 2013 and will be operational from the 2013/2014 winter season;
2. Work has begun to complete the sewer collectors, and restoration has been completed, with procedures for connecting residential units soon to begin.
3. Funds have been secured from the Lazio Region for the completion of the aqueduct, and the work on the aqueduct (previously started and then interrupted) will soon resume.

It is hoped that the Region will issue a law dedicated to Lazio's ski resorts, respectful of mountain territories and local populations, based on a 360° "sustainability": economic, social, and ecological, to protect the work of the many tourism operators in Lazio's winter resorts.

=== Cycling ===
The climb to Monte Livata from Subiaco has an overall elevation gain of about 1,200 m and average gradients of around 6% over a total length of about 19 km. In 1975, it was the finish line of the second half-stage of the second stage of the Tirreno-Adriatico (Frascati > Monte Livata), with a victory by Italo Zilioli.

== See also ==
- Subiaco
