= Monti Simbruini =

Mountain range in Italy

Coordinates: 41°47′28″N 13°38′45″E

The Monti Simbruini are a mountain range in central Italy, a part of Apennines mountain system.

The 'Simbruini' name derives from Simbruvium, a lake formed by the river Anio, situated in the territory of the Aequi; it may derive from Latin sub imbribus ("under the rain"). They are also popularly known as "Rome's Alps".

== Geography ==
The Monti Simbruini mark a part of the border between Abruzzo and Lazio. The Monti Simbruini border with the Monti Cantari and the Carseolani Mountains. The range's highest peak is Monte Cotento, at 2,015 metres (6,611 ft) in elevation.

The headwaters of the River Aniene are in the range. The Liri river, one of the main Italian rivers, also originates in the mountains (Petrella Liri).

On the Lazio side of the mountain range, between the provinces of Rome and Frosinone, a natural park has been established, the Parco naturale regionale Monti Simbruini.

== Regional Park of the Monti Simbruini ==
The Regional Park of the Monti Simbruini, which also includes the Monti Cantari range, was established in 1983. It has an area of 300 square kilometres (120 mi^{2}).

The regional park and mountains include the comuni (villages) of: Camerata Nuova, Cervara di Roma (Campaegli), Filettino, Jenne, Subiaco (Monte Livata), Trevi nel Lazio and Vallepietra.

== Natural history ==
=== Habitats ===
Habitats in the Monti Simbruini include: the Apennine deciduous montane forests ecoregion, in the temperate broadleaf and mixed forests biome; and the Italian sclerophyllous and semi-deciduous forests ecoregion, in the Mediterranean forests, woodlands, and scrub biome.

==== Flora ====
- European beech — Fagus sylvatica (primary tree species)
- Sweet Chestnut — Castanea sativa
- Common Hazel — Corylus avellana
- Downy Oak — Quercus pubescens
- Gentian — Gentiana species
- European Hornbeam — Carpinus betulus
- Lily — Lilium species
- Iris - Iris marsica and Iris germanica
- Montpellier Maple — Acer monspessulanum
- Red raspberry — Rubus idaeus
- Alpine currant — Ribes alpinum
- European mountain-ash — European mountain-ash (aka: Rowan, European Rowan)
- Dwarf Whitebeam — Sorbus chamaemespilus
- Strawberry tree — Arbutus unedo
- Yew — Taxus baccata
- Terebinth — Pistacia terebinthus
- Lingonberry — Vaccinium vitis-idaea
- Violet species

==== Fauna ====
- Aesculapian snake
- Barn owl
- Beech marten
- Boar
- Brown trout
- Carrion crow
- Green whip snake — Coluber viridiflavus
- Crested porcupine
- Edible dormouse
- Eurasian badger
- Eurasian jay
- Eurasian sparrowhawk
- European hedgehog
- Fox
- Golden eagle
- Northern goshawk
- House mouse
- Italian wolf
- Least weasel
- Little owl
- Roe deer
- Marsican brown bear — Ursus arctos marsicanus
- Salamandrina terdigitata
- Tawny owl
- Vipera aspis
- Wild cat
