= Arcinazzo Romano =

Comune in Latium, Italy

- Comune
- Comune di Arcinazzo Romano
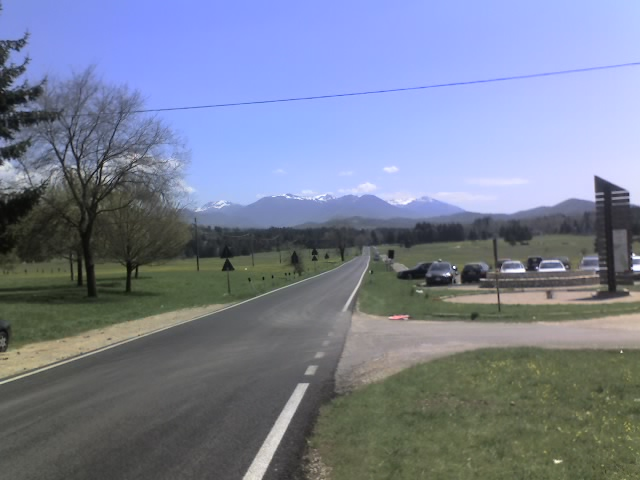
- View of Arcinazzo's plateau.

- Coat of arms

- Location of Arcinazzo Romano in Italy Arcinazzo Romano (Lazio)
- Coordinates: 41°53′N 13°7′E
- Country: Italy
- Region: Lazio
- Metropolitan city: Rome (RM)
- Frazioni: Altipiani di Arcinazzo

Government
  - Mayor: Luca Marocchi

Area
  - Total: 28.3 km^{2} (10.9 sq mi)
- Elevation: 831 m (2,726 ft)

Population (30 April 2017)
  - Total: 1,334
  - Density: 47.1/km^{2} (122/sq mi)
- Demonym: Ponzesi
- Time zone: UTC+1 (CET)
  - Summer (DST): UTC+2 (CEST)
- Postal code: 00020
- Dialing code: 0774
- Patron saint: St. George
- Saint day: 23 April
- Website: Official website

Arcinazzo Romano is a comune (municipality) in the Metropolitan City of Rome in the Italian region of Lazio, located about 50 kilometres (31 mi) east of Rome.

Arcinazzo Romano borders the following municipalities: Affile, Jenne, Piglio, Roiate, Serrone, Subiaco, Trevi nel Lazio. It was called Ponza until 1891.

The area of Arcinazzo includes a wide plateau (altopiano in Italian), a popular holiday resort; the plateau is home to the remains of the Villa of Trajan, the summer palace and hunting residence of emperor Trajan.
