= Quirico Pignalberi =

Italian Roman Catholic priest

Venerable Quirico Pignalberi O.F.M. Conv.

Priest
- Born: 11 July 1891; Serrone, Frosinone, Kingdom of Italy
- Died: 18 July 1982 (aged 91); Anzio Colonia, Rome, Italy
- Venerated in: Roman Catholic Church
- Attributes: Franciscan habit

Quirico Pignalberi, O.F.M. Conv. (11 July 1891 – 18 July 1982) was an Italian Roman Catholic priest and a professed member of the Conventual Franciscans. Pignalberi served as a medic on the front lines during World War I and served as a novice master and rector of seminarians in the interwar period until the conclusion of World War II, when he acted as a sought-after confessor and preacher across his region. He was a friend of Saint Maximilian Kolbe and was the last custodian of the late saint's work until his death.

Pignalberi's beatification cause commenced under Pope John Paul II in 1992 after the late priest was titled as a Servant of God and he was proclaimed as Venerable on 3 March 2016 after Pope Francis confirmed his life of heroic virtue.

== Life ==
Quirico Pignalberi was born on 11 July 1891 in Frosinone as the last of five children to the peasants Egidio Pignalberi and Caterina Proietti. He received his baptism on 12 July 1891 in the church of the Sacred Heart in La Forma – a small district in Serrone. He received his Confirmation on 29 September 1893 at the age of two from Cardinal Angelo Bianchi.

In his childhood, while at school, his teacher asked him to manage the classroom and left. Moments later, a shot was heard, and his teacher had killed himself in order to avoid repercussions from Freemasons who had ordered him to assassinate King Umberto I. This had a profound effect on Pignalberi, who decided to fight against the enemies of God where it was possible. Before the reception of his First Communion he decided to pursue the ecclesiastical life after a nun spoke about the dignities of such a life. After attending primary school, he continued his high school studies privately with the parish priest of Serrone.

Pignalberi joined the Franciscan Conventuals on 30 October 1908 in Zagarolo in Rome and made his religious profession on 14 November 1909 after the conclusion of his novitiate. He studied at the Pontifical Gregorian from 1911 to 1913 and later studied at the Saint Bonaventure institute that his order managed from 1914 until 1917. It was while he studied that he met and befriended Saint Maximilian Kolbe. He was ordained to the priesthood on 10 August 1917.

During the onslaught that became World War I, he worked as a medic on the front lines (after being drafted) and, after the war, was stationed in Rome in 1920 as the rector of seminarians. He served as a novice master from 1925 first in Bagnoregio and then in the convent of San Lorenzo in Piglio where he served for almost five decades. He had been sent to a Franciscan house in 1919 in Capranica and then to Cave in Rome in 1920 before he was made as novice master. Pignalberi became a popular and sought-after confessor and preacher who travelled across the region at the request of parish priests and bishops alike. He met with Maximilian Kolbe for the final time in 1937 when the priest returned from Japan to the Italian Peninsula. The end of World War II in Europe saw him work for the reconstruction of communities and the search for lost or damaged assets as a result of the war.

Father Pignalberi continued to cultivate a lifelong passion for repairing clocks, and he liked to work with precision instruments and technologies that allowed him to craft and repair things. As such, he participated in the European Exhibition of Cribs in Milan with an artistic crib that he himself made and received an award. In 1958 he took a pilgrimage to Lourdes. He travelled to Poland in 1971 in connection with the beatification of Maximilian Kolbe, whom Pope Paul VI beatified, and he visited the late priest's cell at the Auschwitz concentration camp.

He had serious health issues as he aged, and was soon reliant on a wheelchair. Nevertheless, he continued to work wherever it was possible for as long as he could manage to do so. He was admitted to the Hospital of Santo Spirito in Rome for pleurisy and then treated at a hospital in Anagni after he had a fall, at which point he was placed in a nursing home for greater care and rehabilitation. On 1 April 1979, he met Pope John Paul II, who embraced the frail priest and recognized him as the last custodian of Maximilian Kolbe's life and works.

== Death ==
Pignalberi died in 1982 at the nursing home of "La Francescana". His remains were interred in the Pignalberi plot in Frosinone but his remains were later re-interred on 30 March 1985 in the chapel of the San Lorenzo convent in Piglio.

== Beatification ==
On 11 February 1992, the then postulator for the Conventual Franciscans made a request to Bishop Dante Bernini of Albano to begin the cause of canonization for the late Pignalberi. The beatification process was set to commence on 27 March 1992 after the transfer of the competent forum from Albano to the Diocese of Anagni-Alatri. The diocesan process was inaugurated under Bishop Luigi Belloli on 20 June 1992 and closed on 1 July 2005 under Bishop Lorenzo Loppa. As the diocesan process took place, he was proclaimed a Servant of God on 9 July 1992 after the Congregation for the Causes of Saints issued the official "nihil obstat" (nothing against) to the cause. The C.C.S. validated the process on 9 February 2007.

The Positio was taken to the C.C.S. in 2011 and passed on to consulting theologians on 3 February 2015, who voiced their approval while the cardinal and bishop members of the C.C.S. also voiced their approval of the cause on 9 February 2016. On 3 March 2016, he was proclaimed to be Venerable after Pope Francis confirmed that the late priest had lived a model Christian life of heroic virtue.

The current postulator assigned to the cause is Angelo Paleri.
