= Trebania gens =

Ancient Roman family

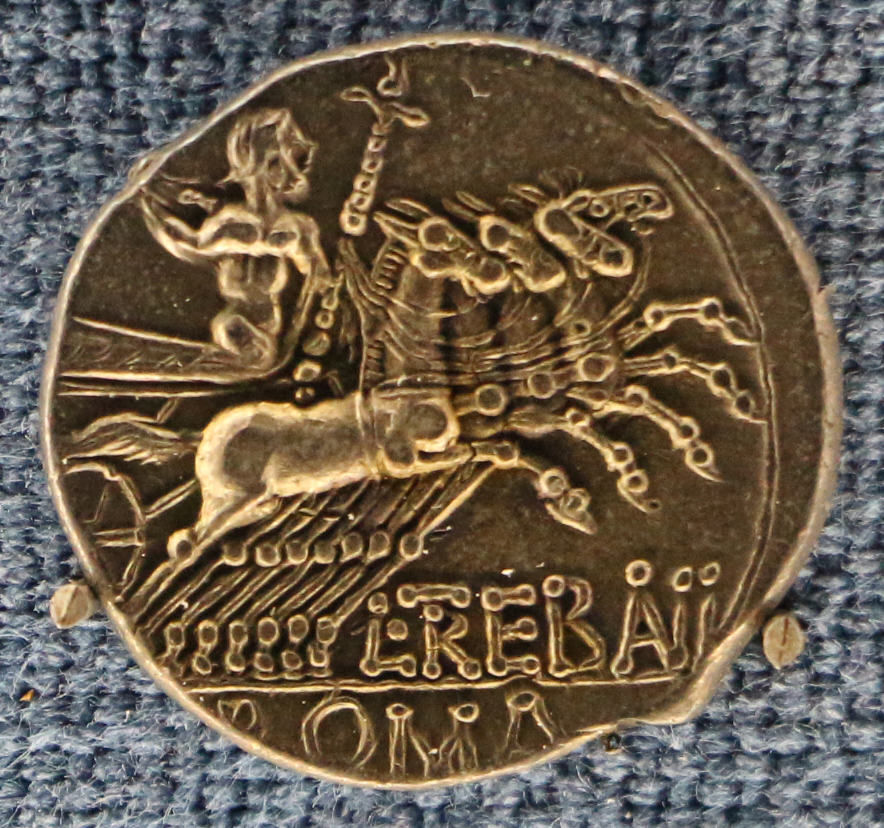
Denarius of Lucius Trebanius. This side is the reverse, depicting Jupiter driving a quadriga, with the inscriptions "L. Treban." and "Roma". The obverse features a head of Pallas, or perhaps Roma.

The gens Trebania or Trebana was an obscure plebeian family at ancient Rome. Only a few members of this gens are known, chiefly from inscriptions.

== Origin ==
The nomen Trebanius belongs to a class of gentilicia formed from cognomina ending in -as and -atis, usually derived from place names, or ending in -atus. Trebanius appears to be derived from the city of Treba in Sabinum, near the border with Latium. The similarly-named Trebatia gens likely derives its nomen from the same root.

== Members ==
- Lucius Trebanius, triumvir monetalis at some point between about 135 and 126 BC. His coins feature a head of Pallas on the obverse, while the reverse depicts Jupiter driving a quadriga.
- Gaius Trebanius Rufus, named in a bronze inscription from Neapolis in Campania.
- Publius Trebanus Salistianus, buried at Trebula Mutusca, aged thirty, in a first-century tomb built by his wife, Ulpia Sabina.

== See also ==
- List of Roman gentes

== Bibliography ==
- Joseph Hilarius Eckhel, Doctrina Numorum Veterum (The Study of Ancient Coins, 1792–1798).
- Dictionary of Greek and Roman Biography and Mythology, William Smith, ed., Little, Brown and Company, Boston (1849).
- Theodor Mommsen et alii, Corpus Inscriptionum Latinarum (The Body of Latin Inscriptions, abbreviated CIL), Berlin-Brandenburgische Akademie der Wissenschaften (1853–present).
- George Davis Chase, "The Origin of Roman Praenomina", in Harvard Studies in Classical Philology, vol. VIII, pp. 103–184 (1897).
- T. Robert S. Broughton, The Magistrates of the Roman Republic, American Philological Association (1952–1986).
