= Trebatia gens =

Ancient Roman family

The gens Trebatia was a minor plebeian family at ancient Rome. Members of this gens are first mentioned at the time of the Social War, in which one of the Samnite generals was a Trebatius, but the best-known of the Trebatii is likely the jurist Gaius Trebatius Testa, a contemporary and friend of Cicero, Caesar, and Augustus.

== Origin ==
The nomen Trebatius belongs to a class of gentilicia usually formed from cognomina ending in -as or -atis, usually derived from place names, as well as from surnames ending in -atus. Like the nomen of the similarly named Trebania gens, it likely derives from the town of Treba in Sabinum.

== Praenomina ==
The main praenomina of the Trebatii were Gaius, Gnaeus, and Marcus. From their filiations, we also know that the Trebatii who lived at Mevania used Lucius, while those who lived at Aeclanum used Publius.

== Branches and cognomina ==
A family of the Trebatii lived at Mevania in Umbria during the first century BC and first century AD. A larger family of this name seems to have lived at Aeclanum in Samnium from the first to the third century.

== Members ==
This list includes abbreviated praenomina. For an explanation of this practice, see filiation.

- Trebatius, according to Appian, a general of the Samnites during the Social War. He defeated the Roman general Gaius Cosconius, and raised the siege of Canusium, but was badly beaten by Cosconius while fording the Aufidus with his army, and forced to take refuge within the walls of Canusium.
- Gaius Trebatius Testa, an advocate and contemporary of Cicero, who recommended him to Caesar as an authority on the civil law. Trebatius accompanied Caesar during the Gallic Wars and the Civil War, and his opinions were highly regarded by Augustus. He was the teacher of the noted jurist Marcus Antistius Labeo, and is frequently cited by the Digest, although his own works have not survived.
- Gaius Trebatius Rufio, named in an inscription from Casilinum in Campania, dating between the middle of the first century BC, and the Battle of Actium.
- Trebatia, named in a sepulchral inscription from Mevania in Umbria, dating from the late first century BC, along with the priests Trebatius and Sextus Titellius.
- Trebatius L. f., a priest at Mevania, named along with his colleague, Sextus Titellius, and a woman named Trebatia, in an inscription dating from the late first century BC.
- Gnaeus Trebatius Cn. l., a freedman and priest, was buried at Mevania at the end of the first century BC, or the beginning of the first century AD.
- Gaius Trebatius Cn. f. L. n. Maximus, along with his uncle, Gnaeus Trebatius Clemens, built an early first-century tomb at Mevania for his father, Gnaeus Trebatius.
- Gnaeus Trebatius L. f., buried in an early first-century tomb at Mevania, built by his son, Gaius Trebatius Maximus, and brother, Gnaeus Trebatius Clemens.
- Gnaeus Trebatius L. f. Clemens, along with his nephew, Gaius Trebatius Maximus, built an early first-century tomb at Mevania for his brother, Gnaeus Trebatius.
- Trebatia C. l. Epistole, a freedwoman named along with Gaius Trebatius Seleucus in an inscription from Rome, dating from the first half of the first century.
- Gaius Trebatius Seleucus, named along with the freedwoman Trebatia Epistole in an inscription from Rome, dating from the first half of the first century.
- Gaius Trebatius C. l. Stephanus, named along with the freedwoman Terentia Favor in an inscription from Rome, dating from the first half of the first century.
- Titus Trebatius Tarentinus, purchased two pots each from Quintus Dirvitius and Titus Edusius Mantaeus, dating from the first half of the first century.
- Trebatia P. f. Procilla, buried in a first-century tomb dedicated by one of her children at Aeclanum in Samnium, along with two persons named Marcus Trebatius Rufus.
- Marcus Trebatius C. f. Rufus, buried in a first-century tomb at Aeclanum, along with another Marcus Trebatius Rufus and Trebatia Procilla.
- Marcus Trebatius M. f. Rufus, buried in a first-century tomb at Aeclanum, along with another Marcus Trebatius Rufus and Trebatia Procilla.
- Trebatia, together with Avonia T[...], made a first- or second-century offering to the Magna Mater near Capena in Etruria.
- Gaius Trebatius Faustus, together with his wife, Festa, built a first- or second-century tomb at Rome for their young son, Mercurius, aged three years and four months.
- Marcus Trebatius Priscus, consul suffectus in AD 108, during the reign of Trajan. He and his colleague, Publius Aelius Hadrianus, the future emperor Hadrian, held the fasces from the Kalends of May to the Kalends of September.
- Gaius Trebatius C. f., together with Theia Justina, dedicated a second-century tomb at Aeclanum for Aulus Ignius Crispinus, Aula Ignia Crispina, and another Theia Justina. Trebatius is identified as frater, but it is unclear from the inscription whose brother he was.
- Trebatia Januaria, buried in a second-century tomb at Aeclanum, built by her husband, Lucius Eggius Proculus.
- Trebatia Januaria, buried in a second-century tomb at Aeclanum, built by her son, Marcus Trebatius Valens.
- Gnaeus Trebatius Logus, along with Quintus Metilius Mario and Marcus Rossius Ampliatus, made an offering to the Magna Mater at Venusia in Samnium, recorded in a second-century inscription.
- Marcus Trebatius Philetus, built a second-century tomb at Aeclanum for his wife, whose name has not been preserved.
- Marcus Trebatius Quartus, dedicated a second-century tomb at Aeclanum for a woman, perhaps a wife or daughter, whose name is uncertain.
- Marcus Trebatius Valens, dedicated a second-century tomb at Aeclanum for his mother, Trebatia Januaria.
- Gaius Trebatius Zoilus, built a second-century cinerarium at Rome for his friend, Aulus Sempronius Salutaris.
- Trebatius Clarus, a second-century Roman senator and the former master of Gnaeus Trebatius Pisinacte.
- Gnaeus Trebatius Pisinacte, freedman of the senator Trebatius Clarus, manumitted his natural daughter, Trebatia Eutychia, at Rome in AD 183.
- Trebatia Eutychia, a slave freed by her natural father, Gnaeus Trebatius Pisinacte, freedman of the senator Trebatius Clarus, at Rome on the eleventh day before the Kalends of February, (Note: January 22, by modern reckoning.) AD 183.
- Trebatius Marinus, the addressee of a rescript by the jurist Ulpian, indicating that whether a parent has a good reason for refusing to support his children is a matter to be determined by a judge. Marinus had written that a father could refuse to support a son who had informed against him.
- Trebatius Eroticus, together with his wife, Quete, dedicated a tomb at Aeclanum, dating between the middle of the second century and the end of the third, for their son, Vibius Felix, aged nineteen years, ten months, and eight days.
- Trebatius Sabinus, buried at Aeclanum, in a tomb dating between the middle of the second century and the end of the third, built by his wife, Cerrinia Veneria. They were the parents of Trebatia Sabina.
- Trebatia Sabina, the daughter of Trebatius Sabinus, built a tomb at Aeclanum, dating between the middle of the second century and the end of the third, for her mother, Cerrinia Veneria.
- Trebatia Secunda, together with her children, built a third-century tomb at Asisium in Umbria for her husband, Primitivus.
- Trebatia Rufina, buried in a fourth- or fifth-century tomb at Rome, built by her husband, Aurelius Sapricius.

=== Undated Trebatii ===
- Gaius Trebatius Heracla, dedicated a tomb at Rome for Caecilia Nice.
- Trebatia Herois, named in an inscription from Ravenna in Cisalpine Gaul.
- Trebatia Marcellina, a woman of the upper class, whose name was found on a lead pipe at Rome.
- Trebatia Paulina, along with her children, Terentia Basila, Terentia Julianus, and Terentia Juliane, dedicated a tomb at Pompeiopolis in Galatia, for her husband, Gaius Terentius Macro, aged seventy.
- Trebatia Phyllis, buried at Rome.
- Gaius Trebatius Priamus, built a sepulchre at Seperna in Sabinum for himself and Cornelia Philumina.
- Gaius Trebatius Primigenius, named in a bronze inscription from an uncertain province.
- Gaius Trebatius Rufio, together with Gaius Vibius Macer, built a sepulchre at Rome for the family of Quintus Cornelius Rufus, out of the legacy left for them by will.
- Gaius Trebatius Salassus, named on a piece of pottery from Rome.
- Trebatius Victorinus, a child buried at the site of modern Torre Le Nocelle in Campania, aged thirty-five months.

== See also ==
- List of Roman gentes

== Bibliography ==
- Marcus Tullius Cicero, Epistulae ad Familiares.
- Pomponius Porphyrion, Commentarii in Q. Horatium Flaccum (Commentaries on Horace).
- Appianus Alexandrinus (Appian), Bellum Civile (The Civil War).
- Digesta, or Pandectae (The Digest).
- Institutiones Justiniani.
- Dictionary of Greek and Roman Biography and Mythology, William Smith, ed., Little, Brown and Company, Boston (1849).
- Theodor Mommsen et alii, Corpus Inscriptionum Latinarum (The Body of Latin Inscriptions, abbreviated CIL), Berlin-Brandenburgische Akademie der Wissenschaften (1853–present).
- René Cagnat et alii, L'Année épigraphique (The Year in Epigraphy, abbreviated AE), Presses Universitaires de France (1888–present).
- George Davis Chase, "The Origin of Roman Praenomina", in Harvard Studies in Classical Philology, vol. VIII, pp. 103–184 (1897).
- Paul von Rohden, Elimar Klebs, & Hermann Dessau, Prosopographia Imperii Romani (The Prosopography of the Roman Empire, abbreviated PIR), Berlin (1898).
