= Serrone =

- Comune
- Comune di Serrone
- Coat of arms

- Location within Italy Location within Lazio
- Coordinates: 41°50′N 13°6′E
- Country: Italy
- Region: Lazio
- Province: Frosinone (FR)
- Frazioni: La Forma, San Quirico

Government
  - Mayor: Giancarlo Proietto

Area
  - Total: 15.39 km^{2} (5.94 sq mi)
- Elevation: 738 m (2,421 ft)

Population (1 January 2017)
  - Total: 3,060
  - Density: 199/km^{2} (515/sq mi)
- Demonym: Serronesi
- Time zone: UTC+1 (CET)
  - Summer (DST): UTC+2 (CEST)
- Postal code: 03040
- Dialing code: 0775
- Patron saint: St. Michael Archangel
- Saint day: 29 September
- Website: Official website

Serrone (Central Italian: Jo Serone) is a comune (municipality) in the Province of Frosinone in the Italian region Lazio, located in the Monti Ernici area about 50 kilometres (31 mi) east of Rome and about 30 kilometres (19 mi) northwest of Frosinone.

Serrone borders the following municipalities: Arcinazzo Romano, Olevano Romano, Paliano, Piglio, Roiate.
