= Vallepietra =

- Comune
- Comune di Vallepietra
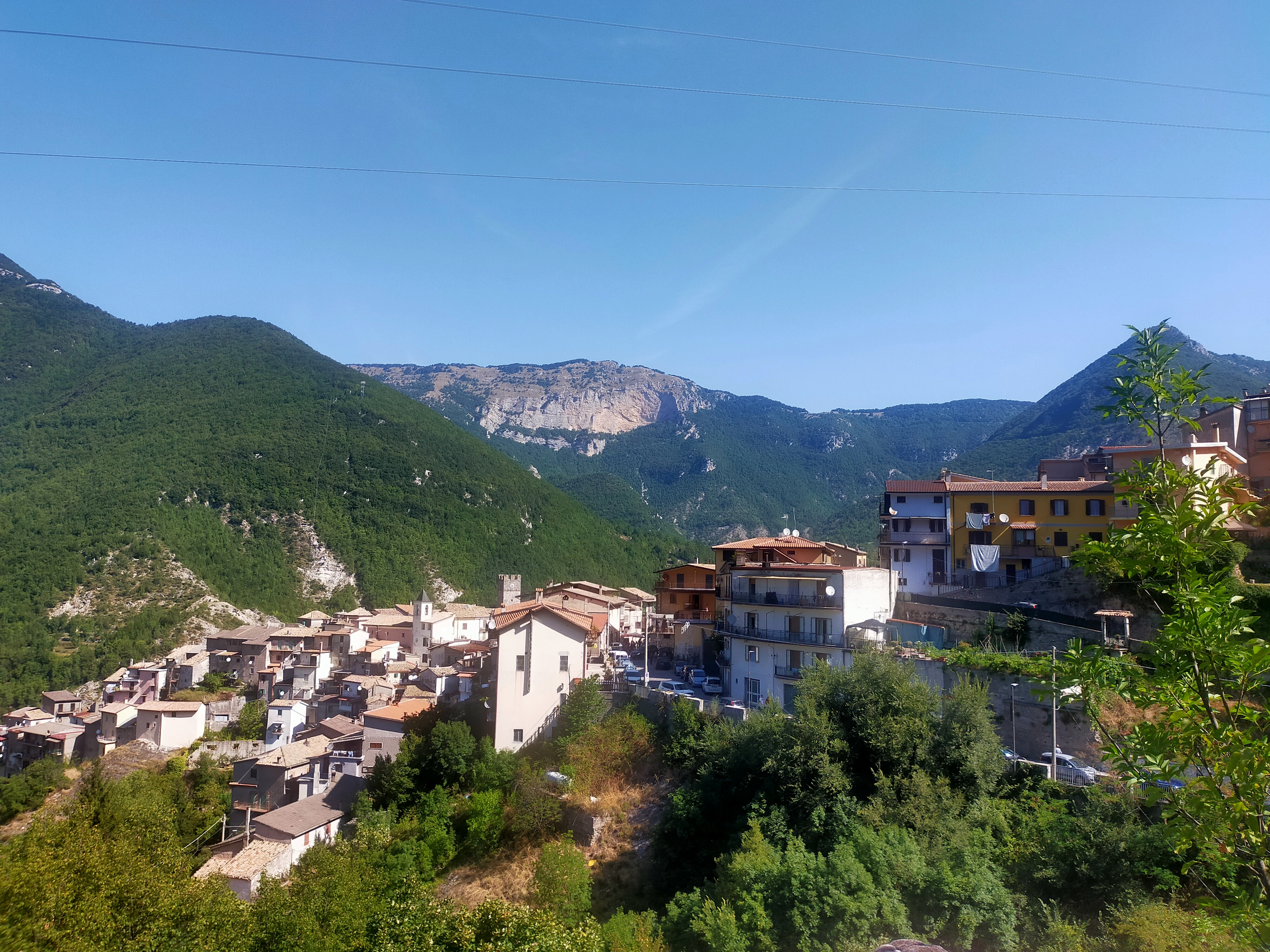

- Coat of arms

- Location within Italy Location within Lazio
- Coordinates: 41°56′N 13°14′E
- Country: Italy
- Region: Lazio
- Metropolitan city: Rome (RM)

Government
  - Mayor: Francesco Palmieri

Area
  - Total: 51.5 km^{2} (19.9 sq mi)
- Elevation: 825 m (2,707 ft)

Population (1 January 2010)
  - Total: 318
  - Density: 6.17/km^{2} (16.0/sq mi)
- Demonym: Vellepietrani
- Time zone: UTC+1 (CET)
  - Summer (DST): UTC+2 (CEST)
- Postal code: 00020
- Dialing code: 0774
- Website: Official website

Vallepietra is a comune (municipality) in the Metropolitan City of Rome in the Italian region Lazio, located about 60 kilometres (37 mi) east of Rome, in the Monti Simbruini area.

Vallepietra borders the following municipalities: Camerata Nuova, Cappadocia, Filettino, Jenne, Subiaco, Trevi nel Lazio.

== Main sights ==
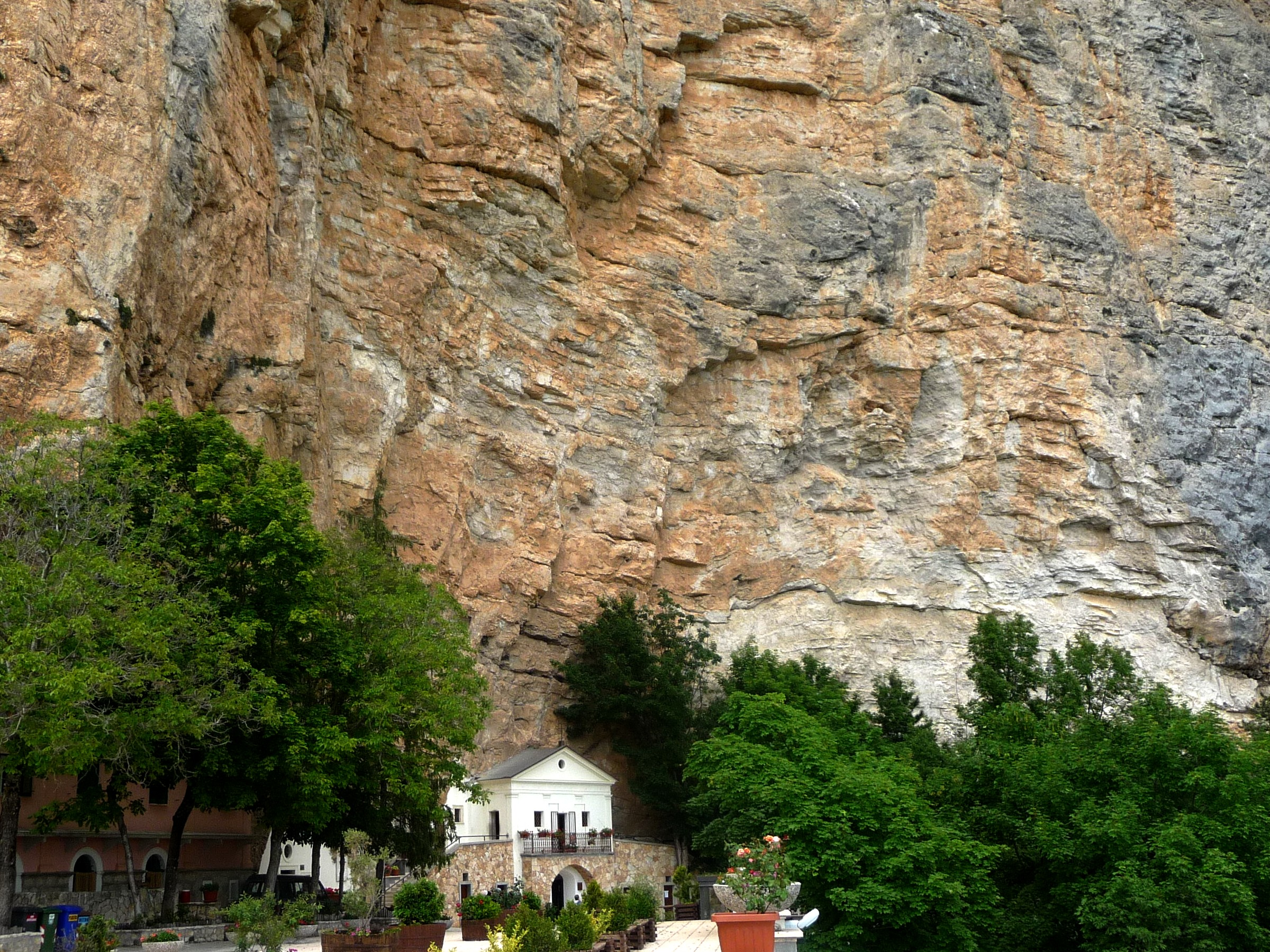
Sanctuary of the Santissima Trinità

Sanctuary of the Santissima Trinità, probably a rock settlement from the Neolithic era, and later a place of popular adoration connected to the Benedictine abbeys in Subiaco. It is still today the end of pilgrimages, often led by feet. The object of the popular adoration is a fresco portraying the Trinity, dating probably from the 12th century, and which has strong Byzantine influences.
