= Verrecchie =

Coordinates: 42°02′09″N 13°14′54″E

- Frazione
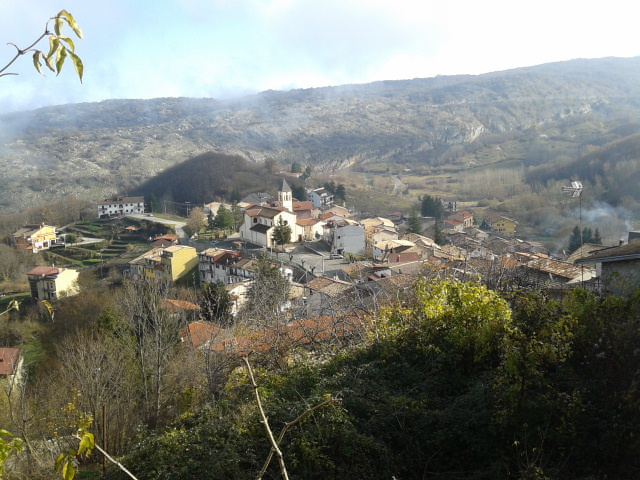
- Interactive map of Verrecchie
- Country: Italy
- Region: Abruzzo
- Province: L'Aquila
- Commune: Cappadocia
- Time zone: UTC+1 (CET)
  - Summer (DST): UTC+2 (CEST)

Verrecchie is a frazione of Cappadocia, in the Province of L'Aquila in the Abruzzo, region of Italy.
