= Camerata Nuova =

- Comune
- Comune di Camerata Nuova
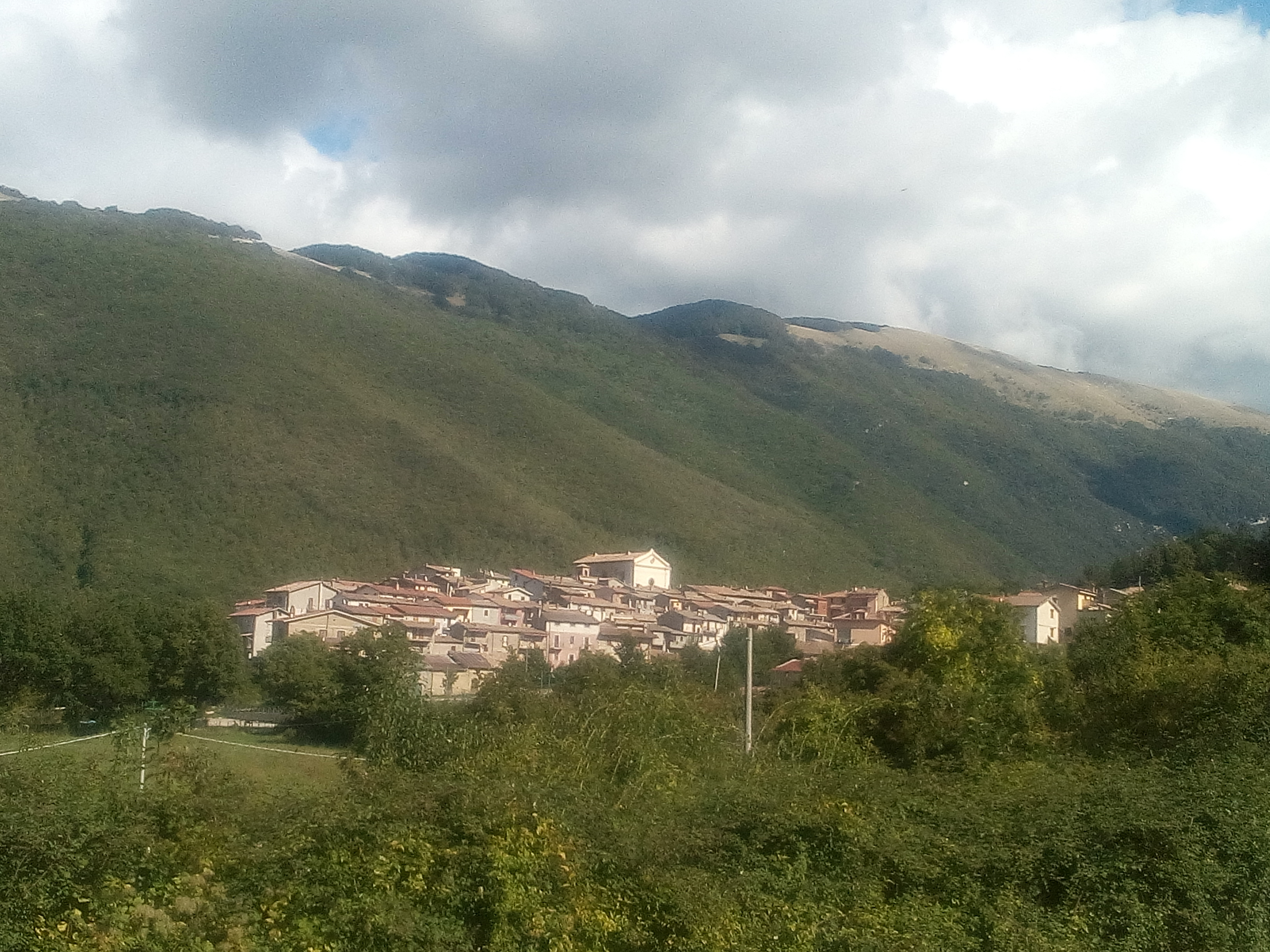
- View of Camerata Nuova

- Coat of arms

- Location within Italy Location within Lazio
- Coordinates: 42°1′N 13°6′E
- Country: Italy
- Region: Lazio
- Metropolitan city: Rome (RM)

Government
  - Mayor: Settimo Liberati

Area
  - Total: 40.5 km^{2} (15.6 sq mi)
- Elevation: 810 m (2,660 ft)

Population (30 March 2022)
  - Total: 407
  - Density: 10.0/km^{2} (26.0/sq mi)
- Demonym: Cameratani
- Time zone: UTC+1 (CET)
  - Summer (DST): UTC+2 (CEST)
- Postal code: 00020
- Dialing code: 0774
- Website: Official website

Camerata Nuova is a comune (municipality) in the Metropolitan City of Rome in the Italian region of Lazio, located about 50 kilometres (31 miles) east of Rome.

Camerata Nuova borders the following municipalities: Cappadocia, Cervara di Roma, Rocca di Botte, Subiaco, Vallepietra.
