= Cervara di Roma =

- Comune
- Comune di Cervara di Roma
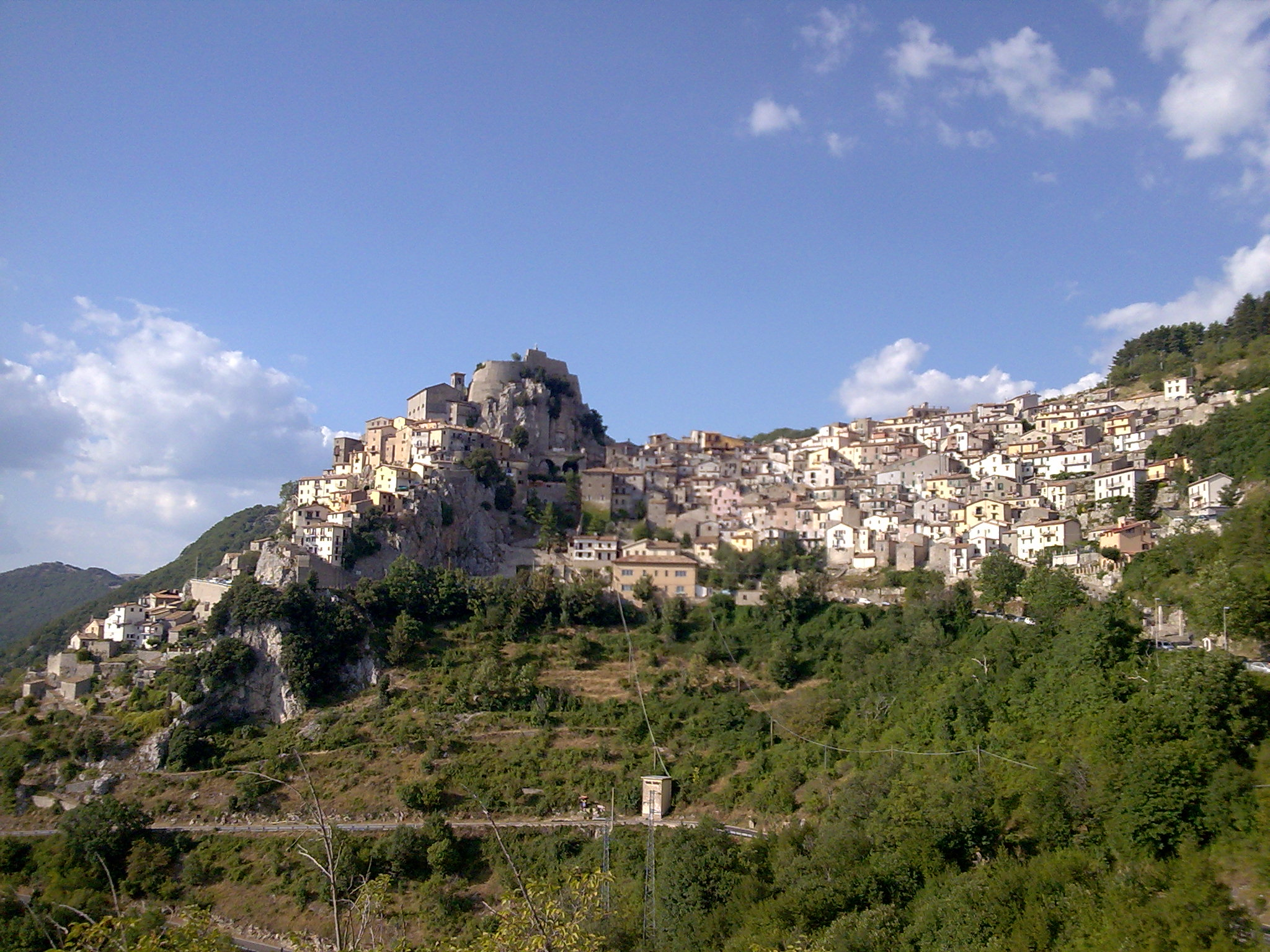
- View of Cervara di Roma

- Coat of arms

- Location within Italy Location within Lazio
- Coordinates: 41°59′N 13°4′E
- Country: Italy
- Region: Lazio
- Metropolitan city: Rome (RM)

Government
  - Mayor: Adriano Alivernini

Area
  - Total: 31.75 km^{2} (12.26 sq mi)
- Elevation: 1,053 m (3,455 ft)

Population (30 June 2017)
  - Total: 444
  - Density: 14.0/km^{2} (36.2/sq mi)
- Demonym: Cervaroli
- Time zone: UTC+1 (CET)
  - Summer (DST): UTC+2 (CEST)
- Postal code: 00020
- Dialing code: 0774
- Website: Official website

Cervara di Roma is a comune (municipality) in the Metropolitan City of Rome in the Italian region of Latium, located about 50 kilometres (31 mi) east of Rome. Cervara di Roma borders the following municipalities: Agosta, Arsoli, Camerata Nuova, Marano Equo, Rocca di Botte, Subiaco.

It was founded by Benedictine monks in the 8th or 9th century. The historic center of Cervara can only be reached by foot after a 35-metre (115 ft) climb. The village is located in the Monti Simbruini Regional Park.

Cervara has experienced a steady loss of population since World War II as residents left farming for jobs in nearby Rome. With approximately 75 percent of Cervara's inhabitants over the age of 60, the town's population dipped to 471 in 2015.
