= Giallo antico =

Yellow marble used by ancient Africans

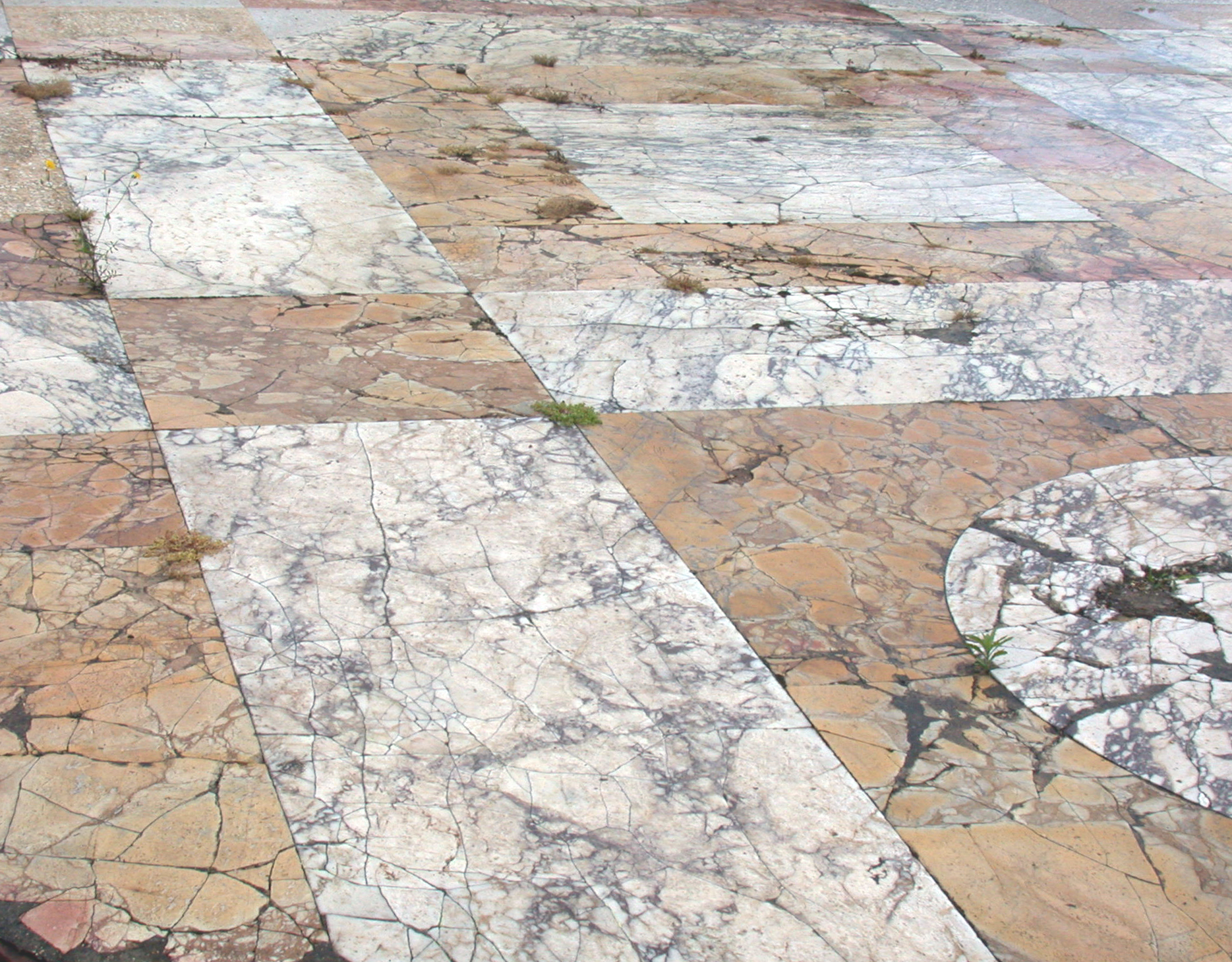
Flooring in giallo antico marble and pavonazzetto marble in Trajan's Forum in Rome (exedra behind the eastern portico)

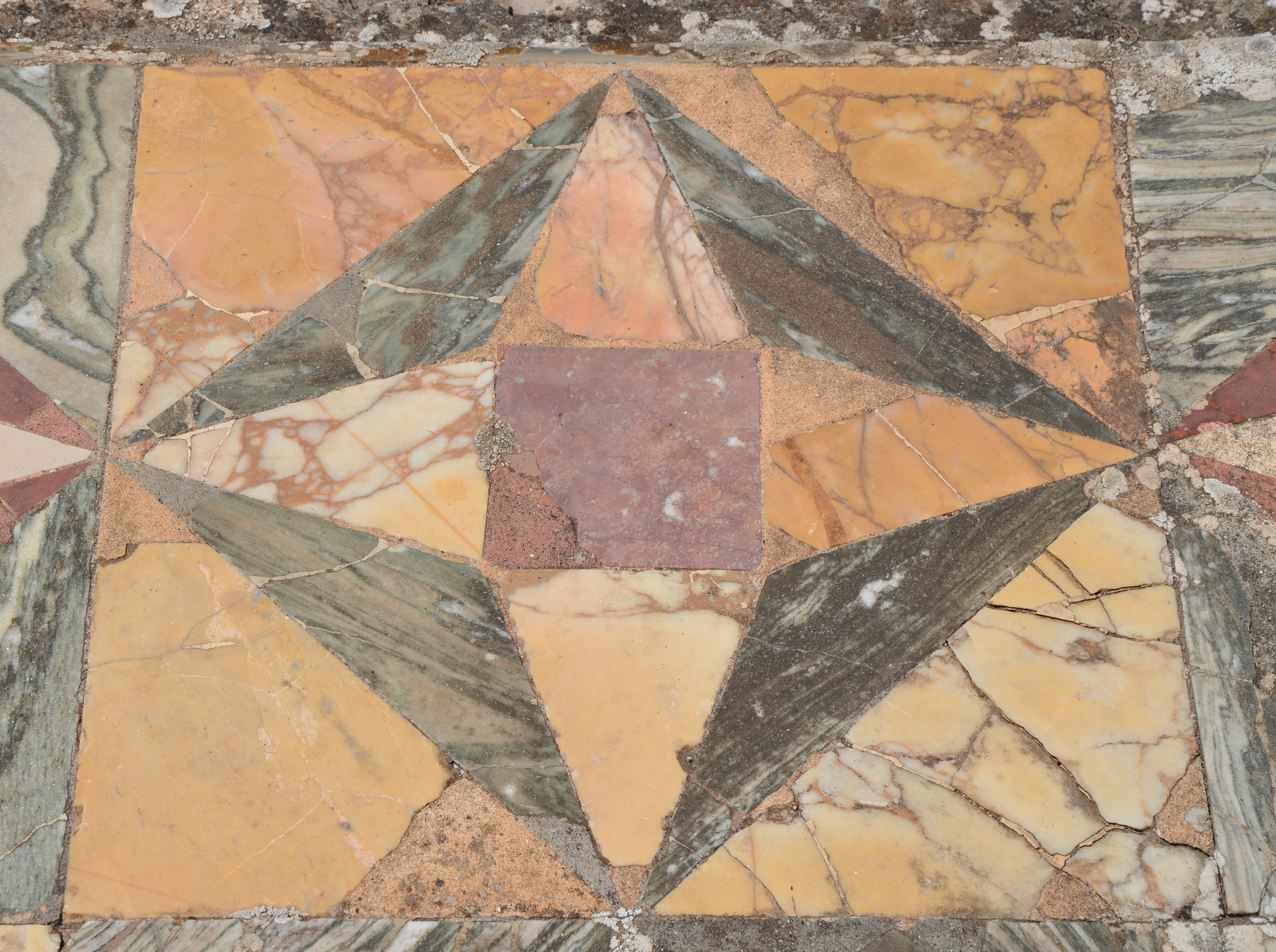
Floor in Opus sectile, Villa Adriana, Tivoli

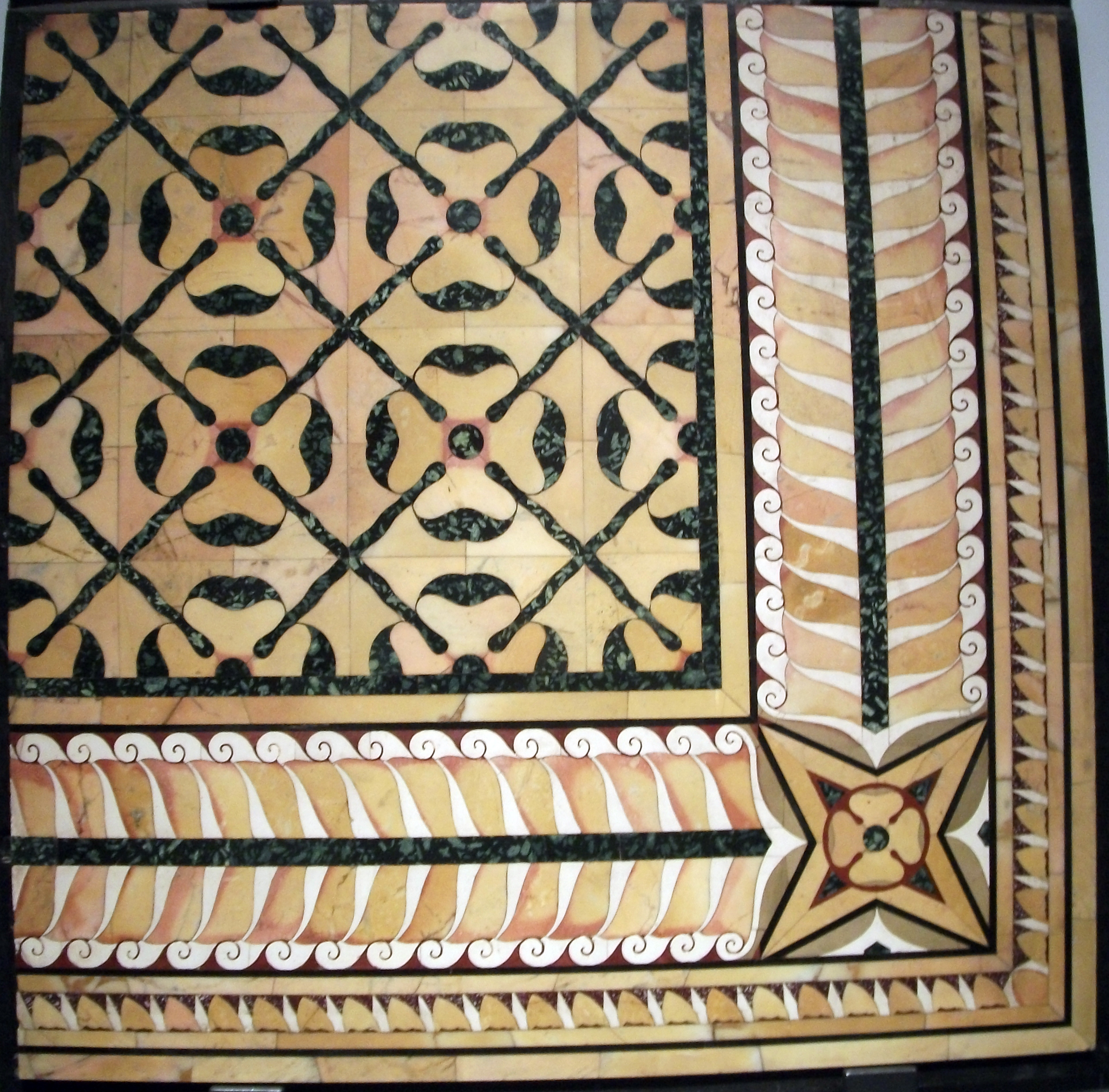
Giallo antico from the Domus Tiberiana, Palatine Hill, Rome

Giallo antico (antique yellow) is a precious yellow marble used first by the ancient Africans and later by the ancient Romans (which they called marmor numidicum (marble of Numidia). It was one of the marbles most favoured by the Romans because of its beautiful yellow colour.

== Description ==
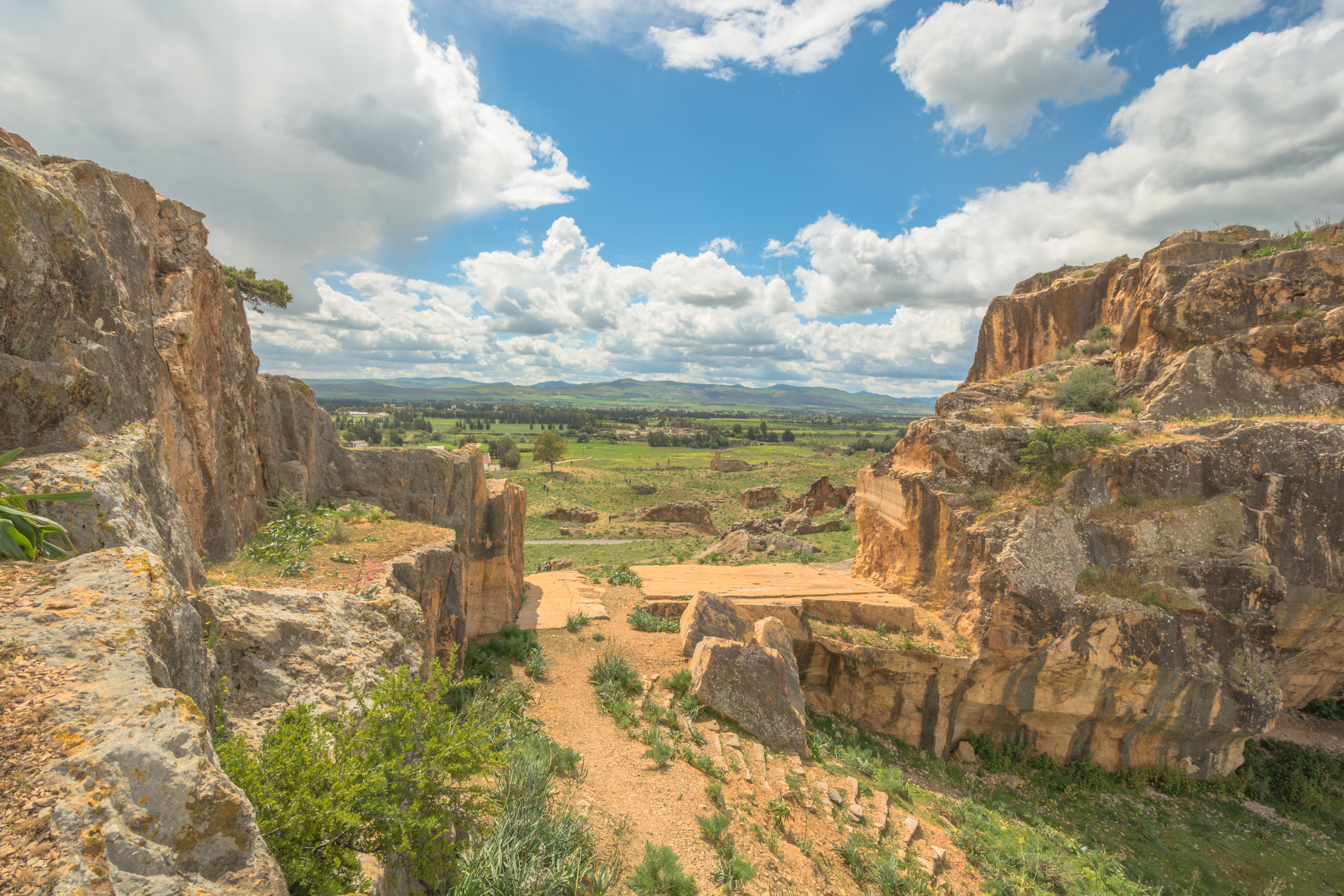
Marble quarry in Chemtou

It was extracted in quarries which can be seen today near the ancient city of Simitthus, near the current village of Chemtou, Tunisia.

Its colour varies from intense yellow to lighter, almost white hues, with dark yellow, reddish or brown veins, and angular clasts of various sizes and colours (shades of yellow, rosy red, brown). Varieties with a uniform background were considered more valuable than the brecciated ones, especially the "golden", and the very rare "of a colour similar to the rose".

It is a crystalline limestone compacted by marked diagenesis.

== History ==
For the second half of the 2nd century BC, giallo antico was used by the Numidian kings. Once Carthage was conquered and the province of Roman Africa was established, the quarries soon became state property and then, under the Principate, imperial property as elsewhere in the empire. The marble was widely used for column shafts and wall and floor coverings in public buildings of cities closest to the coast of the Mediterranean. The Romans began to import it in increasing quantities across the empire where it was also used in prestigious rich private villas.

Pliny attributes its introduction in Rome to Lepidus in 78 BC who used blocks of it for the thresholds of his house. Suetonius reports that the people had an honorific column of Numidian marble dedicated to Caesar erected in the Roman Forum. Augustus used the marble for the columns of the peristyle of his house on the Palatine together with portasanta and pavonazzetto marble, and he also made extensive use of it in his Forum. It was also used for statues of particularly of barbarians or wild beasts. In the 3rd century the quarries gradually became exhausted and the giallo antico was progressively replaced by yellow breccias of other origins and of lesser value.

It is mentioned in Diocletian's Price Edict at the beginning of the 4th century, where a high price is established.

== Bibliography ==
- Dennis Mario Beck, Marmor numidicum. Gewinnung, Verarbeitung und Distribution eines antiken Buntmarmors [Marmor numidicum. Extraction, processing and distribution of an ancient coloured marble], Reichert, Wiesbaden 2024, ISBN 978-3-7520-0755-8
- Gabriele Borghini, Marmi antichi, Leonardo De Luca editori, Roma 1992, pp. 214–215
- Raniero Gnoli, Marmora Romana, Edizioni dell'Elefante, Roma 1988 (III ed.), pp. 166–168.
- Lorenzo Lazzarini, "La determinazione della provenienza delle pietre decorative usate dai Romani", in Lucrezia Ungaro, Marilda De Nuccio (a cura di), I marmi colorati della Roma imperiale (catalogo mostra), Roma 2002, pp. 243–244.
