= Jenne, Lazio =

Jenne
- Comune
- Comune di Jenne
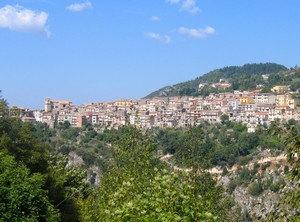
- View of Jenne, Lazio

- Coat of arms

- Location within Italy Location within Lazio
- Coordinates: 41°53′N 13°10′E
- Country: Italy
- Region: Lazio
- Metropolitan city: Rome (RM)

Government
  - Mayor: Giorgio Pacchiarotti

Area
  - Total: 31.5 km^{2} (12.2 sq mi)
- Elevation: 834 m (2,736 ft)

Population (31 August 2017)
  - Total: 356
  - Density: 11.3/km^{2} (29.3/sq mi)
- Demonym: Jennesi
- Time zone: UTC+1 (CET)
  - Summer (DST): UTC+2 (CEST)
- Postal code: 00020
- Dialing code: 0774
- Website: Official website

Jenne is a comune (municipality) in the Metropolitan City of Rome in the Italian region Lazio, located about 60 kilometres (37 mi) east of Rome.

Jenne borders the following municipalities: Arcinazzo Romano, Subiaco, Trevi nel Lazio, Vallepietra.

In the late 12th century, it was the birthplace of Pope Alexander IV.
