= Roiate =

- Comune
- Comune di Roiate
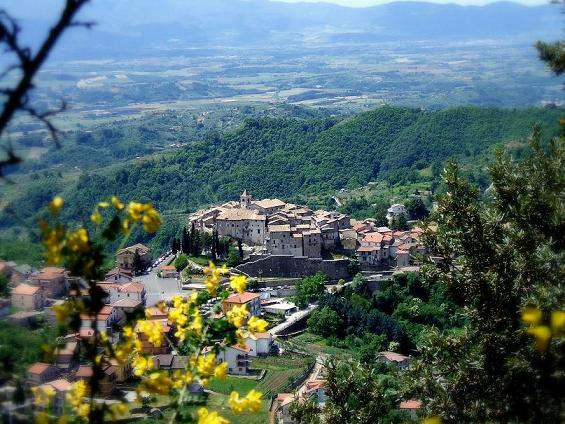
- View of Roiate

- Location within Italy Location within Lazio
- Coordinates: 41°52′N 13°4′E
- Country: Italy
- Region: Lazio
- Metropolitan city: Rome (RM)

Government
  - Mayor: Antonio Proietti

Area
  - Total: 10.36 km^{2} (4.00 sq mi)
- Elevation: 697 m (2,287 ft)

Population (1 January 2016)
  - Total: 737
  - Density: 71.1/km^{2} (184/sq mi)
- Demonym: Roiatesi
- Time zone: UTC+1 (CET)
  - Summer (DST): UTC+2 (CEST)
- Postal code: 00030
- Dialing code: 06
- Patron saint: St. Salvatore
- Saint day: November 9
- Website: Official website

Roiate is a comune (municipality) in the Metropolitan City of Rome in the Italian region of Lazio, located on the slope of Monte Scalambra on the hills between the Sacco and Aniene Rivers, about 45 kilometres (28 mi) east of Rome.
