= Piglio =

- Comune
- Comune di Piglio
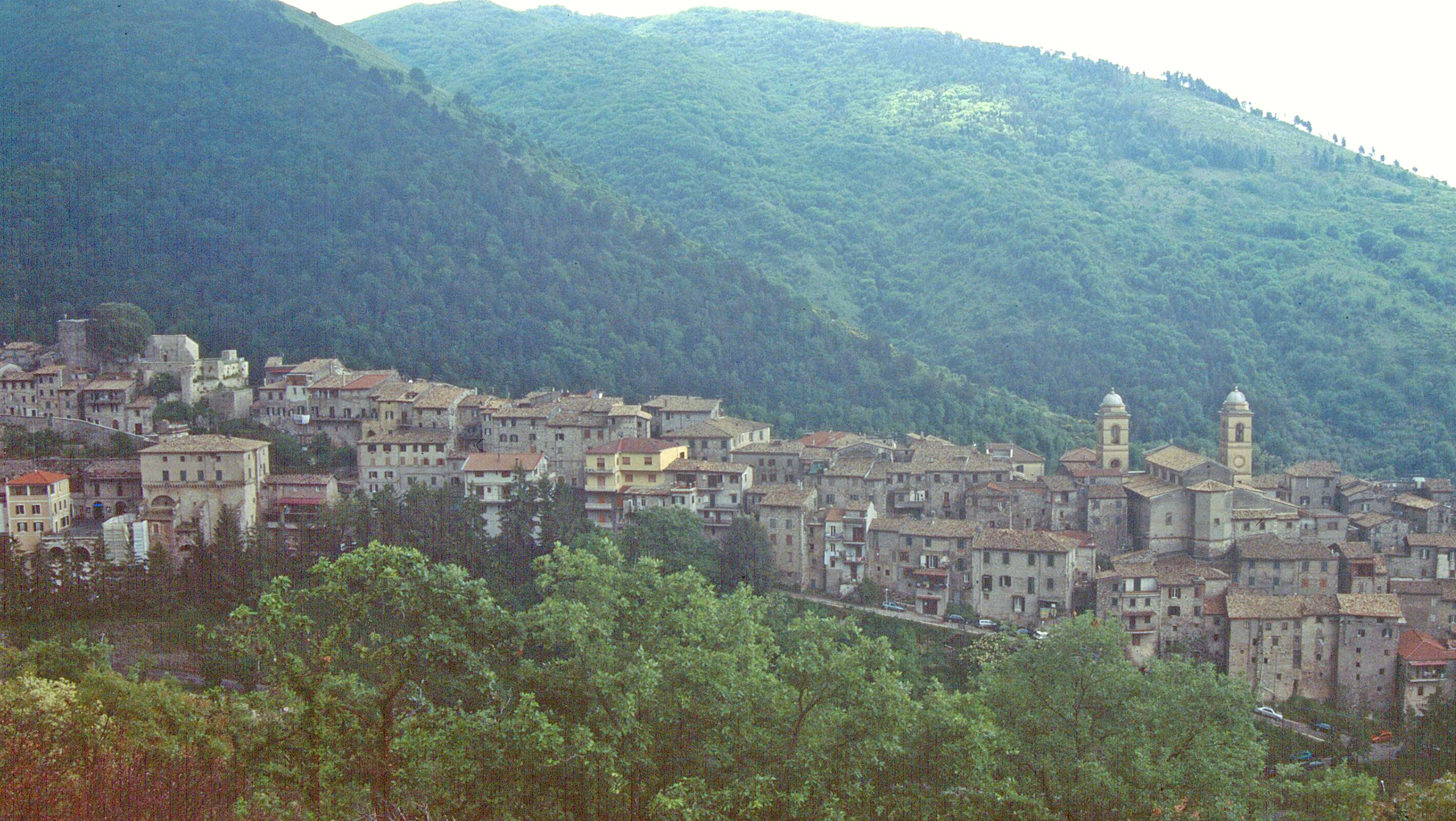
- View of Piglio

- Coat of arms

- Location within Italy Location within Lazio
- Coordinates: 41°50′N 13°9′E
- Country: Italy
- Region: Lazio
- Province: Frosinone (FR)

Government
  - Mayor: Mario Felli

Area
  - Total: 35.38 km^{2} (13.66 sq mi)
- Elevation: 620 m (2,030 ft)

Population (30 November 016)
  - Total: 4,629
  - Density: 130.8/km^{2} (338.9/sq mi)
- Demonym: Pigliesi
- Time zone: UTC+1 (CET)
  - Summer (DST): UTC+2 (CEST)
- Postal code: 03010
- Dialing code: 0775
- Patron saint: St. Lawrence
- Saint day: 12 August
- Website: Official website

Piglio is a comune (municipality) in the Province of Frosinone in the Italian region Lazio, located about 50 kilometres (31 mi) east of Rome and about 30 kilometres (19 mi) northwest of Frosinone, offering a panoramic view on the valleys of the Sacco and Aniene rivers.

== History ==
It has been identified with the ancient Roman Capitulum, a Hernican town. Its area was the seat of several Roman patrician towns.

In 1088 it is mentioned as Castrum Pileum; according to a legend, the name would stem from the Latin pileum, the helmet of Roman general Quintus Fabius Maximus Verrucosus. In that period it depended from the bishop of Anagni and, from the late 12th century, it was first a fief of the De Pileo and then of the De Antiochia families. In 1347 it was captured by Cola di Rienzo and, from the late 14th century, it was under the Colonna family, who held it until 1816. In 1656 the town was decimated by plague.

Piglio became part of the newly formed Kingdom of Italy in 1870. During World War II, it was bombed by Allied planes, which destroyed about 30 percent of the edifices.

== Main sights ==
- Colonna Castle, probably dating to the early 11th century. The lower part, better preserved, is from the 14th century.
- Church of Santa Maria Maggiore (13th century), destroyed in 1944 and remade in Baroque style afterwards.
- Church of San Rocco, with a 15th-century fresco of Madonna, St. Lawrence and Saints.
- Church of St. Lawrence, remade in 1773 and again in 1954.
