= Cappadocia, Abruzzo =

Cappadocia
- Comune
- Comune di Cappadocia
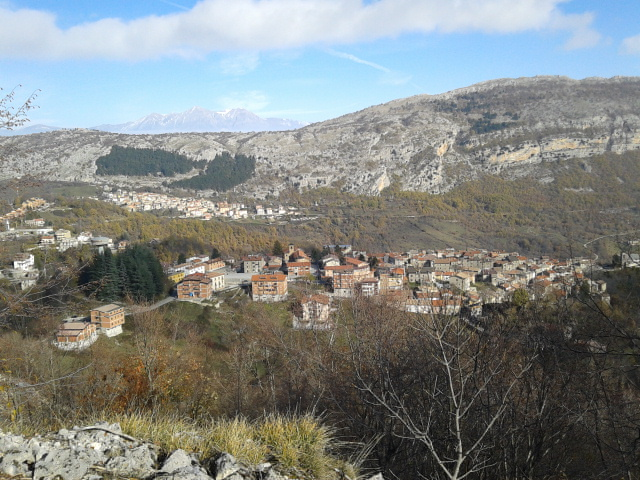

- Location within Italy Location within Abruzzo
- Coordinates: 42°00′27″N 13°16′51″E
- Country: Italy
- Region: Abruzzo
- Province: L'Aquila (AQ)
- Frazioni: Camporotondo, Petrella Liri, Verrecchie

Government
  - Mayor: Lucilla Lilli

Area
  - Total: 67.20 km^{2} (25.95 sq mi)
- Elevation: 1,108 m (3,635 ft)

Population (31 July 2015)
  - Total: 529
  - Density: 7.87/km^{2} (20.4/sq mi)
- Demonym: Cappadociani
- Time zone: UTC+1 (CET)
  - Summer (DST): UTC+2 (CEST)
- Postal code: 67060
- Dialing code: 0863
- Patron saint: St. Blaise and St. Margaret
- Saint day: 3 February
- Website: Official website

Cappadocia (In Marsican Dialect: Cappadoza) is a comune and town with approximately 550 inhabitants in the province of L'Aquila in the Abruzzo region of central Italy. It is part of Marsica. It's also part of the "Borghi autentici d'Italia" (English: Autentic Boroughs of Italy) club.

== Physical Geography ==
The area, collected in the Valley of The Nerfa, between the south-ovest versant of the Caresolain Mountains (Padiglione and Aurunzo), and it marks the border between Abruzzo and Lazio, in the centre of the Appenino Centrale Abbruzzese.

It's 100 km to Rome 135 km to Pescara, 68 to L'Aquila and 22 from Avezzano. In the comune are included the frazione of Petrella Liri, Verrechie and the touristic destination of Camporotondo, collocated on the Cesca Mountains, and the Homonym ski station.

== Etymology ==
There are various hypothesis on the name origin, and all are disputed

▪︎ From the Latin Caput Duodecim, according to which, the town was founded by 12 criminals, who allegedly committed a "Rape of the Sabine Woman" at the near Petrella Liri

▪︎Again from Latin, Caput Otium, place where Shepherd went to relax.

▪︎ Or from the homonym Turkish Region.

== History ==
In ancient times, Aequi and Marsi lived in the region, before the Roman occupation, but there are nearly zero archeological testimonials from the area

The first historical document, where Cappadocia is mentioned is the Papal bull of 1158 of Pope Clement III, who nominates the Churches of Saint Blaise and Margaret the Virgin

Later, it became part of the Albe county, and then of the Duchy of Tagliacozzo, both fiefs of the "Regno Di Napoli", until its annexion by Kingdom of Italy in 1860.

In the first year of the union, the Marsica, saw the impact of brigandage.

Its inhabitants were mainly occupied by the Transhumance of the Ager Romanus and by wood industry

The area, already damaged by the 1915 Avezzano earthquakes, experienced major human depopulation when many man were sent to war as Alpini guards.

Many, then started a mass immigration to the capital city, Rome.
