= Trevi nel Lazio =

- Comune
- Comune di Trevi nel Lazio
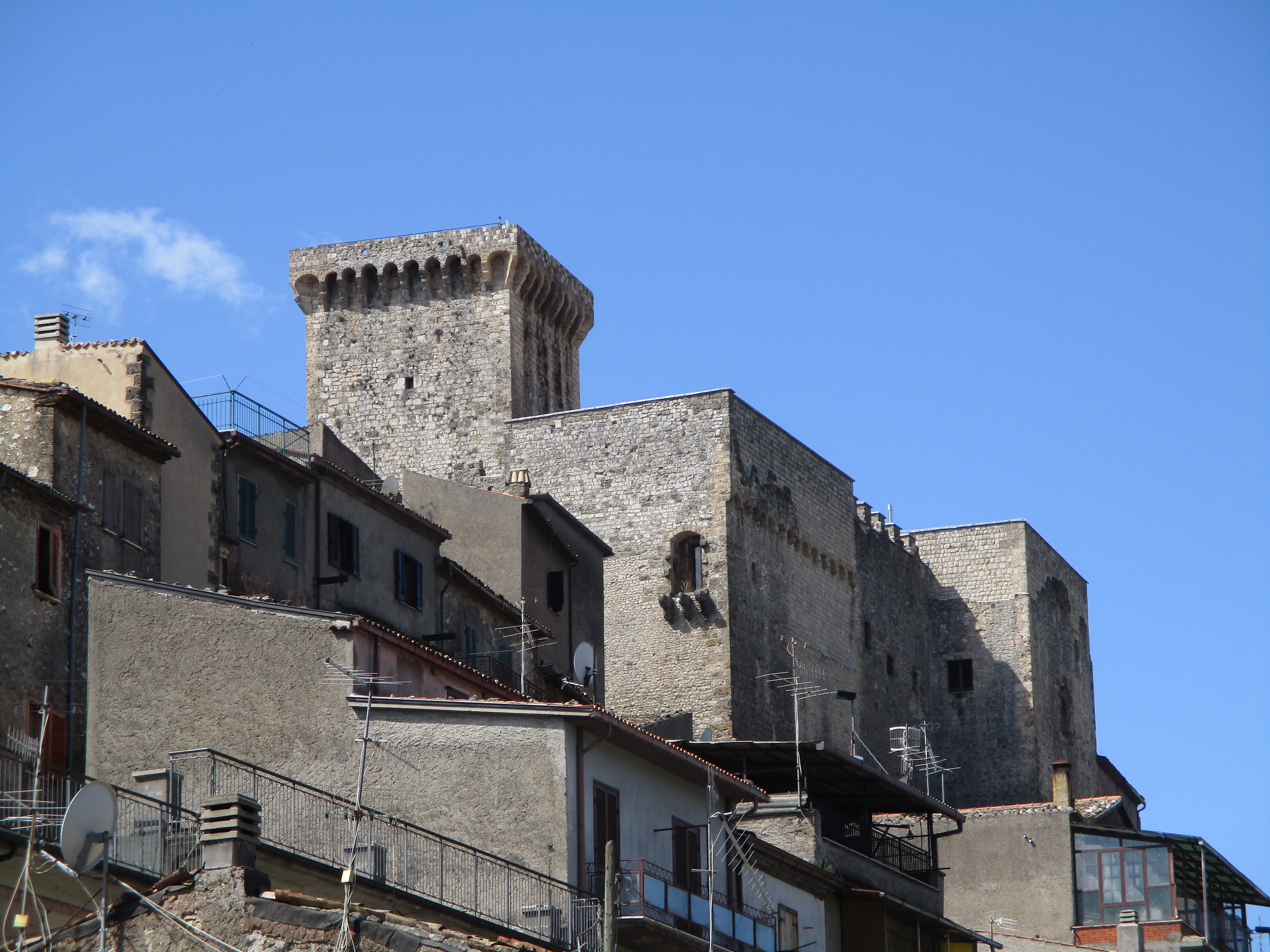
- Castello Caetani

- Coat of arms

- Location within Italy Location within Lazio
- Coordinates: 41°52′N 13°15′E
- Country: Italy
- Region: Lazio
- Province: Frosinone (FR)

Government
  - Mayor: Silvio Grazioli

Area
  - Total: 54 km^{2} (21 sq mi)
- Elevation: 821 m (2,694 ft)

Population (31 December 2016)
  - Total: 1,790
  - Density: 33/km^{2} (86/sq mi)
- Demonym: Trebani
- Time zone: UTC+1 (CET)
  - Summer (DST): UTC+2 (CEST)
- Postal code: 03010
- Dialing code: 0775
- Website: Official website

Trevi nel Lazio is a town and comune (municipality) in the province of Frosinone in the Italian region of Lazio in the upper valley of the Aniene river.

It is 17 kilometres (11 mi) by road northeast of Fiuggi and 23 kilometres (14 mi) by road southeast of Subiaco, the nearest larger towns.

== History ==
The town first makes its appearance as Treba, a place of the Aequi, and later was called Treba Augusta to help distinguish it from Trebiae (Trevi in Umbria). The town was a bishopric from 499 to 1060; in the 15th century, it was sacked by Alfonso V of Aragon.

In August 2011 the Italian government had made plans to merge the village with neighbouring Filettino, in order to cut administrative costs, but they were interrupted by the protestations of the mayor of Filettino, Luca Sellari, who announced his village would become its own independent principality, in order to preserve its identity.

== Main sights ==
An old arch within the territory of the comune is said to be Roman, and some remains of the ancient acropolis have survived, but otherwise Trevi's monuments are medieval or later:

- collegiate church of S. Maria Assunta
- oratory of S. Pietro (not dedicated to the apostle Peter, but to a local hermit)
- oratory of S. Maria del Riposo, with 15th‑century frescoes.

== See also ==
- List of Catholic dioceses in Italy
