= Travia gens =

Ancient Roman family

The gens Travia was an obscure plebeian family at ancient Rome. Few members of this gens are mentioned by Roman writers, but a number are known from inscriptions.

== Praenomina ==
The main praenomina of the Travii were Titus and Marcus, among the most common names at all periods of Roman history. A few members of this gens bore other common names, including Gaius, Lucius, Publius, and Quintus.

== Members ==
This list includes abbreviated praenomina. For an explanation of this practice, see filiation.

- Titus Travius, buried at Ameria in Umbria in the latter half of the first century BC.
- Travius, the name by which Pomponius Porphyrion describes a man whose excessive wealth was criticized by Horace in one of his Satires. Horace calls the man Trausius, an equally obscure nomen.
- Marcus Travius, named in a sepulchral inscription from Aquincum in Pannonia Inferior, dating from the late first century.
- Travius, a soldier in the Legio V, (Note: It's unclear from the inscription whether the Legio V Macedonica or the Legio V Alaudae is meant.) buried in a first- or second-century tomb at Ameria.
- Travia Prima, buried in a first- or second-century tomb at Pisaurum in Umbria, along with Marcus Attius Repens, a local official, and Titus Marius Capito.

=== Undated Travii ===
- Gaius Travius Ɔ. l., a freedman buried at Pola in Venetia and Histria.
- Marcus Travius L. f. Saufeius Sabinus, buried at Rome.
- Marcus Travius M. f. Saufeius Sabinus, named in an inscription from Verona in Venetia and Histria.
- Titus Travius T. l. Acutus, a freedman, was an aurifex, or goldsmith, according to an inscription from Ameria, along with the freedman Titus Travius Argentillus.
- Titus Travius T. l. Argentillus, a freedman, was an aurifex, according to an inscription from Ameria, along with the freedman Titus Travius Acutus. He was also an octovir, in this case perhaps a member of the town council at Ameria.
- Titus Travius Felix, a brickmaker whose wares have been found at various sites throughout Italy.
- Titus Travius Fortunatus, a potter whose maker's mark was found at Rome and Ostia in Latium.
- Travia P. f. Secci, buried at Brixia in Venetia and Histria, along with Lucius Popillius Senex.
- Travia Q. f. Tertia, buried at Aquinum in Latium.
- Marcus Travius Thallus, built a tomb at Verona for himself and Livia Psyche.

== See also ==
- List of Roman gentes

== Bibliography ==
- Quintus Horatius Flaccus (Horace), Satirae (Satires).
- Pomponius Porphyrion, Commentarii in Q. Horatium Flaccum (Commentaries on Horace).
- Theodor Mommsen et alii, Corpus Inscriptionum Latinarum (The Body of Latin Inscriptions, abbreviated CIL), Berlin-Brandenburgische Akademie der Wissenschaften (1853–present).
- Ettore Pais, Corporis Inscriptionum Latinarum Supplementa Italica (Italian Supplement to the Corpus Inscriptionum Latinarum), Rome (1884).
- René Cagnat et alii, L'Année épigraphique (The Year in Epigraphy, abbreviated AE), Presses Universitaires de France (1888–present).
- Paul von Rohden, Elimar Klebs, & Hermann Dessau, Prosopographia Imperii Romani (The Prosopography of the Roman Empire, abbreviated PIR), Berlin (1898).
- Scavi di Ostia, 1953–present.
