= Bandusia =

Bandusia may refer to:

- A spring near Venusia and the subject of The Spring of Bandusia, a poem by Horace
- 597 Bandusia, an asteroid
