= Trausia gens =

Ancient Roman family

The gens Trausia was an obscure plebeian family at ancient Rome. Few members of this gens are mentioned in Roman writers, but several are known from inscriptions.

== Members ==
This list includes abbreviated praenomina. For an explanation of this practice, see filiation.

- Gaius Trausius C. l. Herophilus, a freedman buried at Rome between the middle of the first century BC and the middle of the first century AD.
- Trausius, a man whose excessive wealth was criticized by Horace in one of his Satires. Porphyrion amends his name to Travius.
- Titus Trausius Admetus, a soldier whose name was inscribed as one of the trecenarii (Note: A trecenarius was a soldier entitled to be paid three hundred sestertii, a much higher rate than that received by ordinary soldiers.) in a pay list from Pompeii in Campania, dating from AD 56.
- Gaius Trausius Phoebus, buried in a first- or second-century tomb at Rome.
- Trausia Auge, a freedwoman who, along with the freedman Trausius Paris, built an early second-century tomb at Rome for their patron, Gaius Trausius Lucrio.
- Gaius Trausius Lucrio, the patron of the freedman Trausius Paris and the freedwoman Trausia Auge, who built a tomb for him at Rome, dating from the early second century.
- Trausius Paris, a freedman who, along with the freedwoman Trausia Auge, built an early second-century tomb at Rome for their patron, Gaius Trausius Lucrio.

=== Undated Trausii ===
- Quintus Trausius, buried at Calama in Africa Proconsularis, aged twenty-five, along with Cornelia Fortunata, aged forty, Trausius Saturninus, and Trausia Honorata.
- Trausia C. f. Asiatice, a little girl buried at Rome, aged two years, thirty days, in a tomb built by her parents, Gaius Trausius Pudens and Caesia Veneria. She had a sister of the same name who died in infancy.
- Trausia C. f. Asiatice, an infant buried at Rome, aged three months, eleven days, in a tomb built by her parents, Gaius Trausius Pudens and Caesia Veneria. She had a sister of the same name who died as a small child.
- Gaius Trausius Asiaticus, the brother of Gaius Trausius Pudens, who built a family sepulchre at Rome for himself, his wife, Caesia Veneria, his daughter, Trausia Fortunata, and his brother, making an offering to the spirits of the dead for their protection.
- Trausia C. f. Fortunata, the daughter of Gaius Trausius Pudens and Caesia Veneria, who built a family sepulchre at Rome for themselves, their daughter, and Gaius Trausius Asiaticus, Pudens' brother, making an offering to the spirits of the dead for their protection.
- Trausia Honorata, buried at Calama, aged twenty, along with Quintus Trausius, Trausius Saturninus, and Cornelia Fortunata, aged forty.
- Gaius Trausius Pudens, built a family sepulchre at Rome for himself, his wife, Caesia Veneria, their daughter, Trausia Fortunata, and Pudens' brother, Gaius Trausius Asiaticus, and making an offering to the spirits of the dead for their protection. Pudens and Veneria also buried three children, two daughters named Trausia Asiatice, and a son named Trausius Pudens.
- Gaius Trausius C. f. Pudens, the son of Gaius Trausius Pudens and Caesia Veneria, was an infant buried at Rome, aged four months, twenty-four days.
- Trausius Saturninus, buried at Calama, aged twenty-six, along with Quintus Trausius, Trausia Honorata, and Cornelia Fortunata, aged forty.
- Trausius Valens, a potter whose maker's mark was found at Londinium in Britannia.

== See also ==
- List of Roman gentes

== Bibliography ==
- Quintus Horatius Flaccus (Horace), Satirae (Satires).
- Pomponius Porphyrion, Commentarii in Q. Horatium Flaccum (Commentaries on Horace).
- Theodor Mommsen et alii, Corpus Inscriptionum Latinarum (The Body of Latin Inscriptions, abbreviated CIL), Berlin-Brandenburgische Akademie der Wissenschaften (1853–present).
- Charlton T. Lewis and Charles Short, A Latin Dictionary, Clarendon Press, Oxford (1879).
