= Licenza =

- Comune
- Comune di Licenza
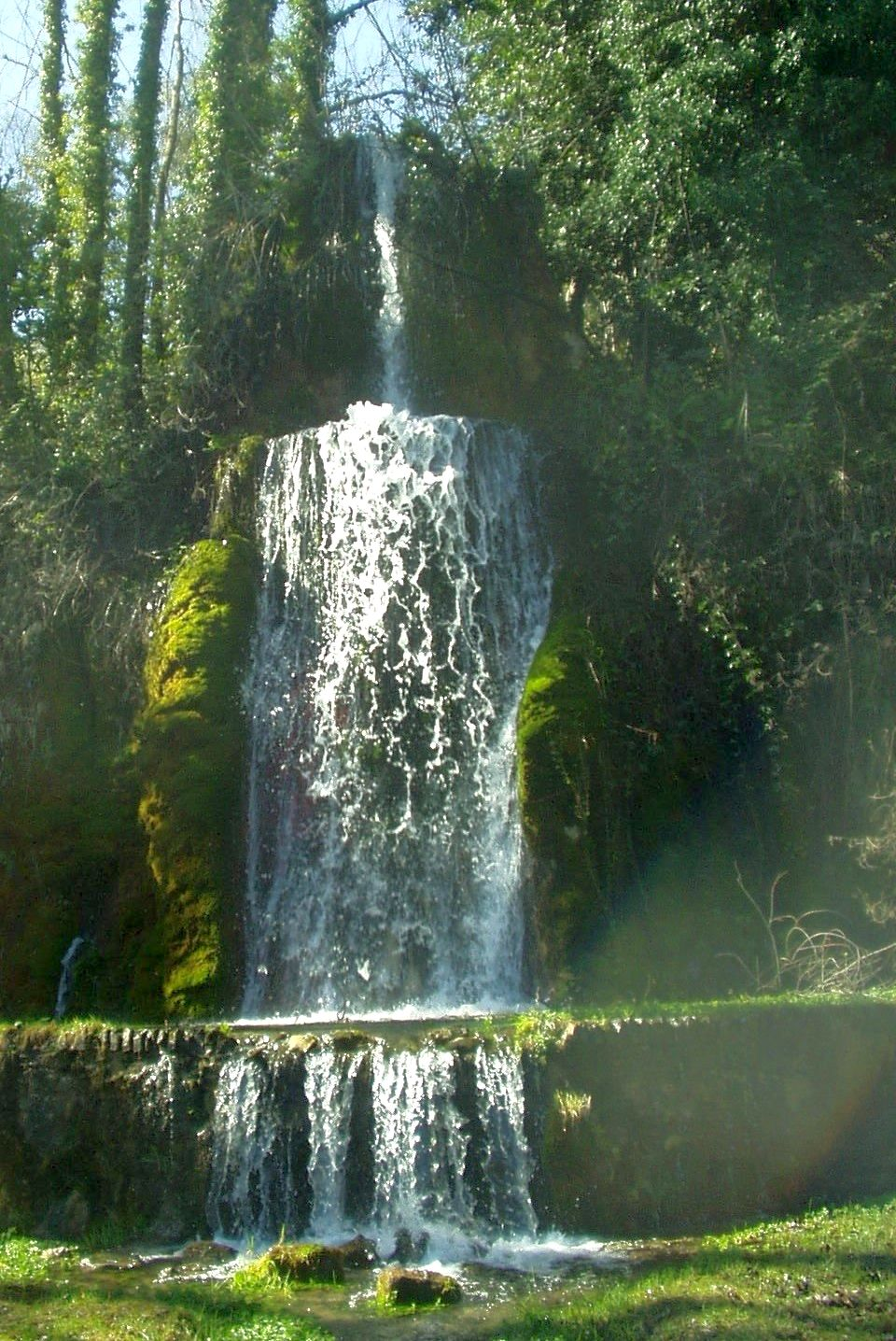

- Coat of arms

- Location within Italy Location within Lazio
- Coordinates: 42°4′N 12°54′E
- Country: Italy
- Region: Lazio
- Metropolitan city: Rome (RM)
- Frazioni: Civitella di Licenza

Government
  - Mayor: Ilaria Passacantilli

Area
  - Total: 17.99 km^{2} (6.95 sq mi)
- Elevation: 475 m (1,558 ft)

Population (30 September 2017)
  - Total: 959
  - Density: 53.3/km^{2} (138/sq mi)
- Demonym: Licentini
- Time zone: UTC+1 (CET)
  - Summer (DST): UTC+2 (CEST)
- Postal code: 00026
- Dialing code: 0774
- Patron saint: St. Roch
- Saint day: 16 August
- Website: Official website

Licenza is a comune (municipality) in the Metropolitan City of Rome Capital, in the Italian region of Latium, located about 40 kilometres (25 mi) northeast of Rome.

Licenza borders the following municipalities: Mandela, Monteflavio, Percile, Roccagiovine, San Polo dei Cavalieri, Scandriglia.

== Main sights ==
- Spring of Bandusium
- Orsini castle
- Horace's Villa
