= Horace's Villa =

Ancient Roman villa complex near Licenza, Italy

Coordinates: 42.0661°N 12.9011°E

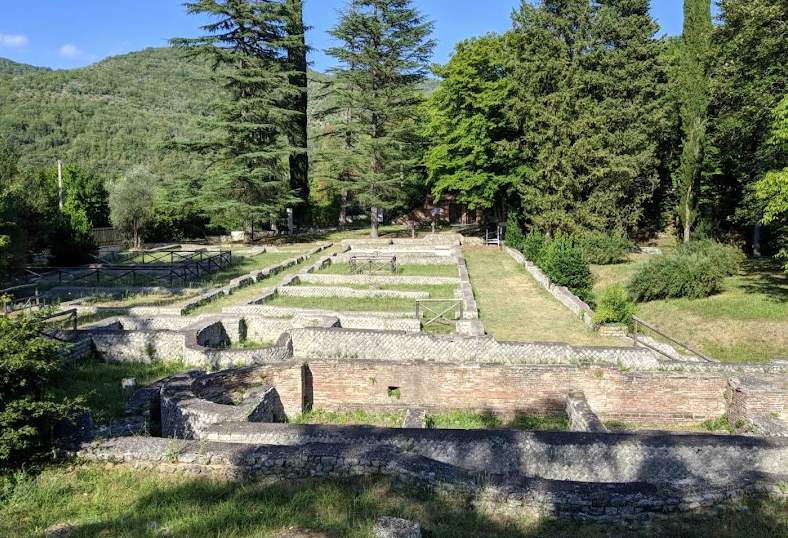
Horace's villa

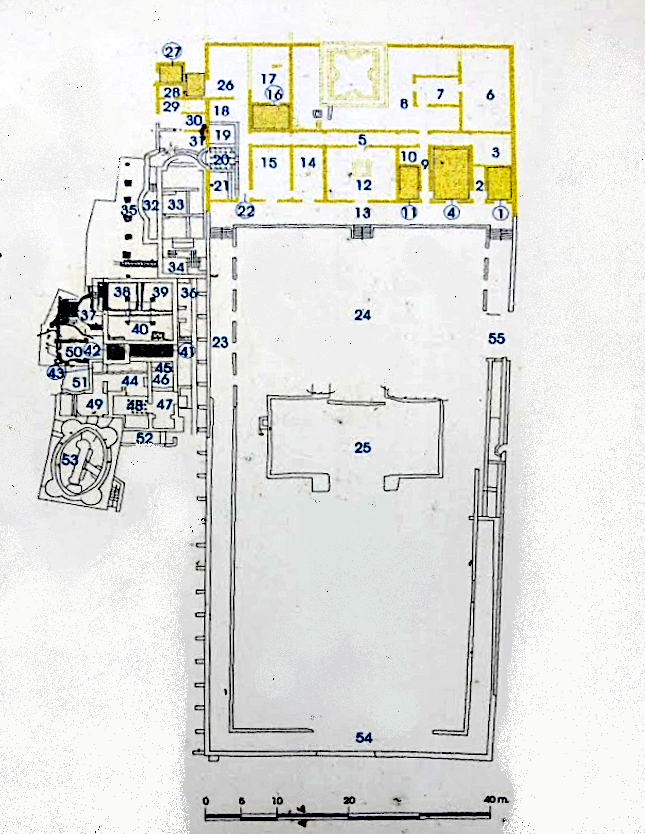
Plan of Horace's villa

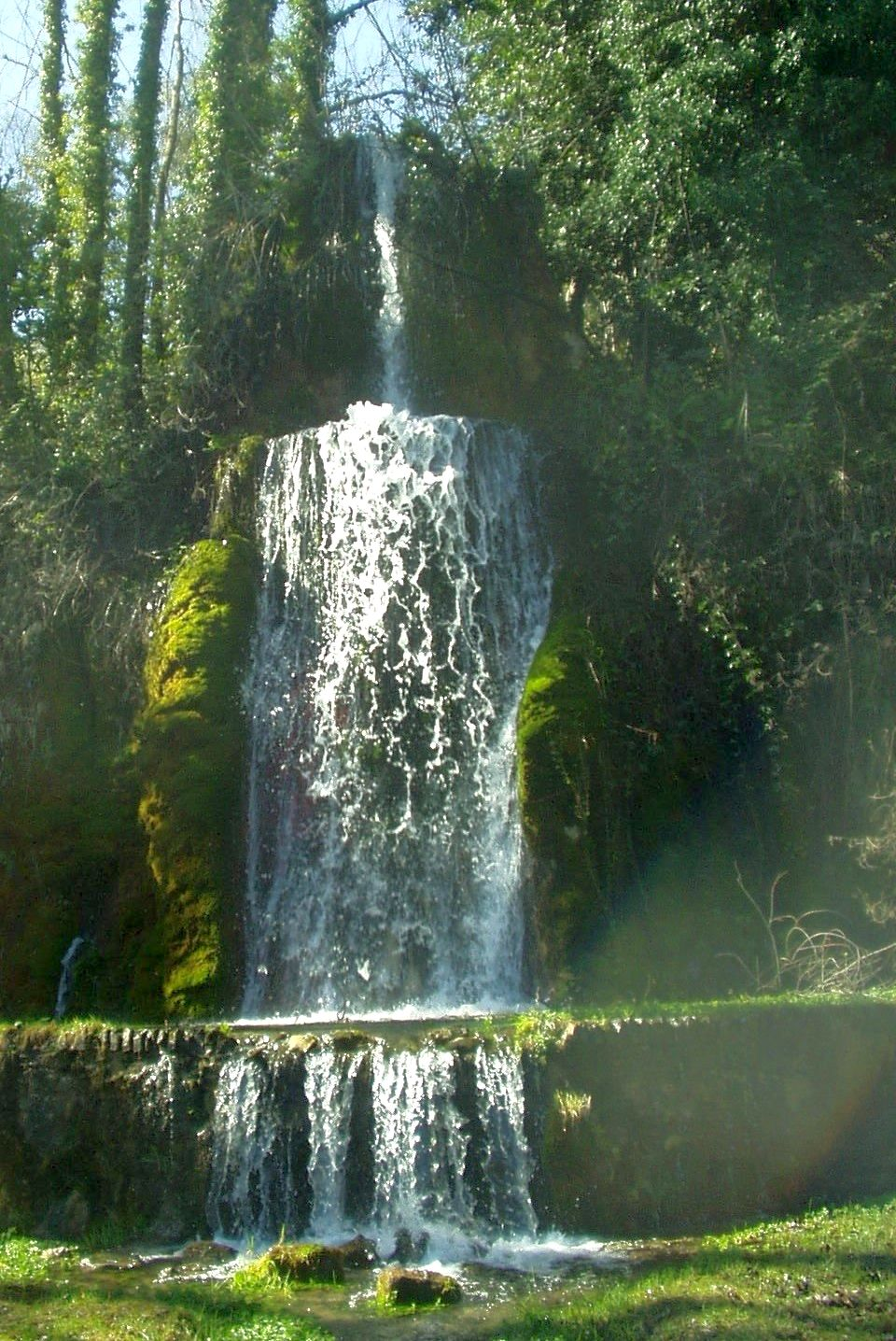
Fons bandusiae

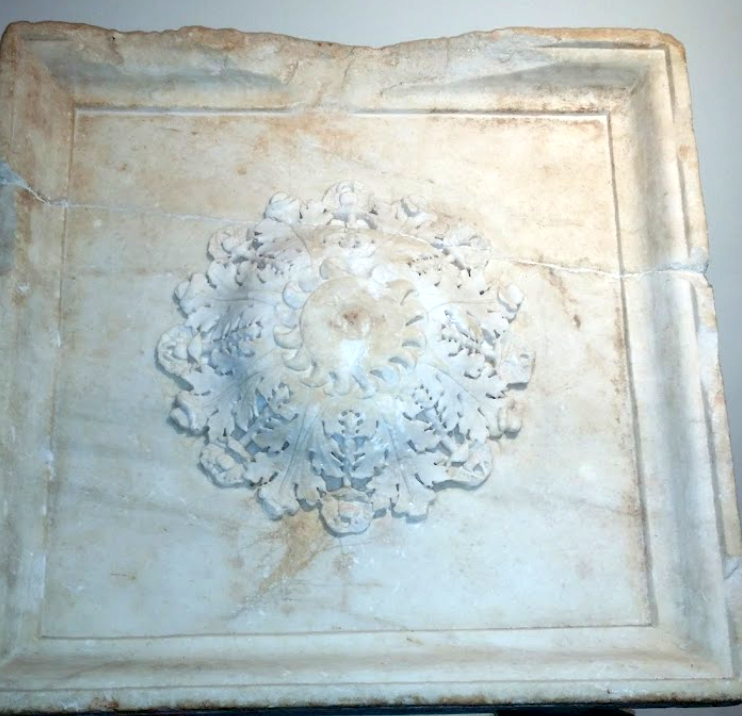
Rosone Lacunare marble ceiling panel (Licenza museum)

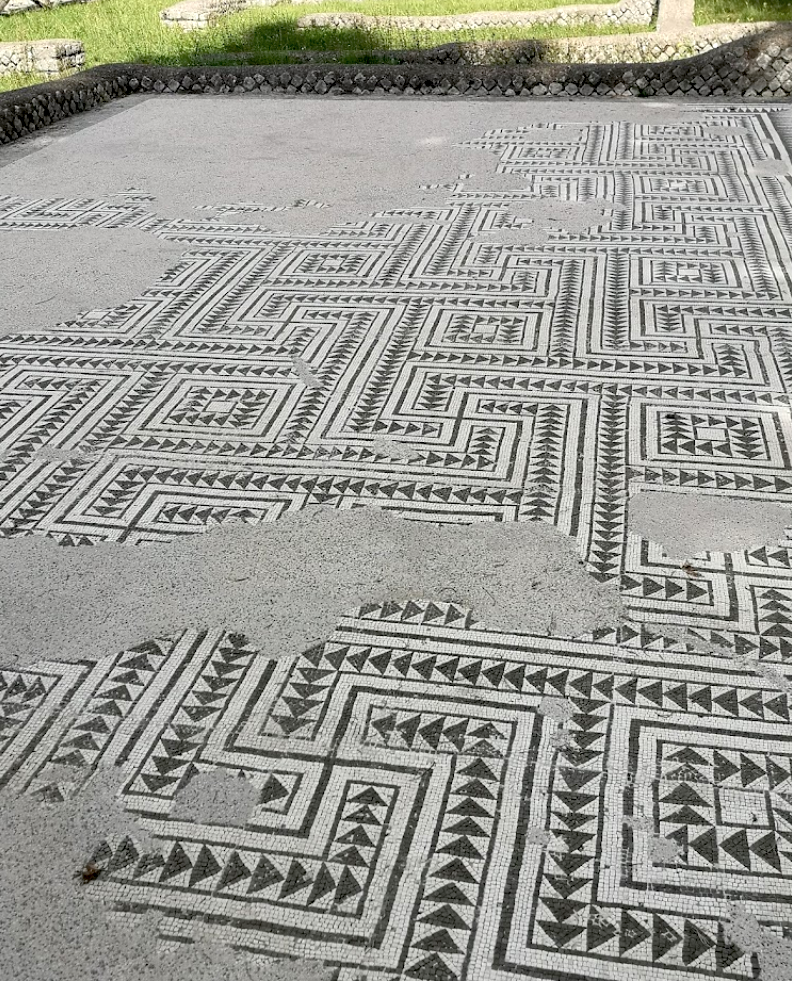
Mosaic floor

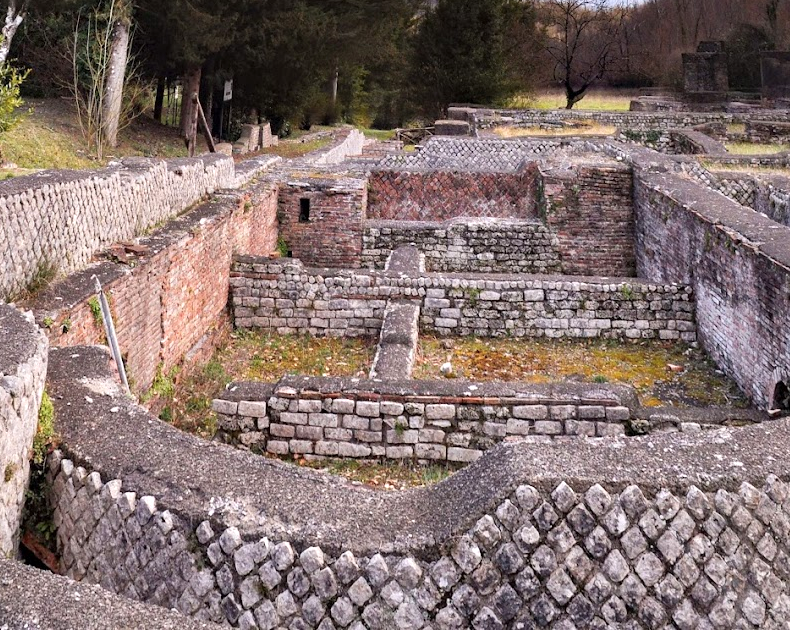
Baths (33)

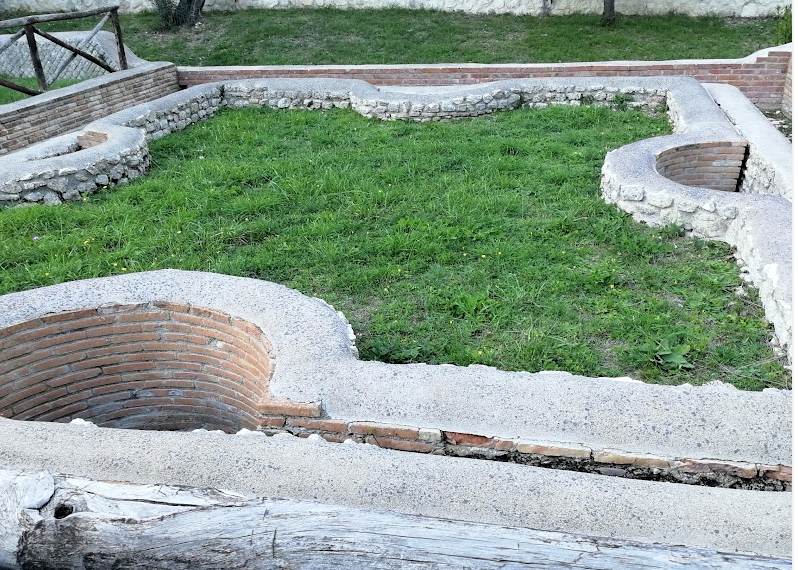
Water garden in area 8

Horace's Villa is a large ancient Roman villa complex near Licenza, Italy. The identification is likely because Horace wrote several poems about the place, and the special elaborate architectural features and location of the villa correspond to the descriptions in the poetry.

The site can be visited today.

== Identification ==
It was owing to references to the villa in Horace's writings that some attempted to find the site as early as the mid-fifteenth century. Horace, in a letter to his friend Quintius, describes in glowing terms the country villa which his patron, Maecenas, had given him:

It lies on a range of hills, broken by a shady valley which is so placed that the sun when rising strikes the right side, and when descending in his flying chariot, warms the left. You would like the climate; and if you were to see my fruit trees, bearing ruddy cornils and plums, my oaks and ilex supplying food to my herds, and abundant shade to the master, you would say, Tarentum in its beauty has been brought near to Rome!

There is a fountain too, large enough to give a name to the river which it feeds; and the Ebro itself does not flow through Thrace with cooler or purer stream. Its waters also are good for the head and useful for digestion. This sweet, and, if you will believe me, charming retreat keeps me in good health during the autumnal days.

Horace tells in one of his poems that his villa was next to the sanctuary of the Sabine goddess Vacuna. Lucas Holstenius (a mid-17th-century geographer and a librarian at the Vatican Library) showed that the Romans associated the Sabine deity with their goddess Victoria mentioned in an inscription in Roccagiovine near Licenza and the site as Fanum Vacunae. A confirmation of Holstenius' thesis came in 1757 with the discovery of the massa Mandelana inscription at Cantalupo (Mandela) also near Licenza mentioning a temple of the goddess Victory which helped antiquarians to identify yet another place name mentioned by Horace as being near his Sabine estate.

=== Excavations ===
Excavations were done in 1911–14 under Pasqui, who died in 1915 before writing his final report. Lugli wrote a provisional report in 1926, though he did not take part in the fieldwork. Lugli briefly worked with Thomas Price on further excavations in 1930–31. It was later found that the 1911–14 excavations hindered interpretation of the buildings since some walls were demolished while others were reconstructed for flimsy reasons.

Therefore new excavations and research in 1997–2003 added to the little knowledge of the site.

== The site ==
The villa lies near the hilltown of Licenza in the Licenza valley and on the east slope of the Colle Rotondo (980 m above sea level) in the Lucretili Mountains. It is one of the best preserved and most significant sites in the area.

The site chosen for the villa and its baths is unusual, as a saddle between a small hill to the east and the slopes of Colle Rotondo to the west was terraced (as described by Horace: an arx enclosed by mountains) to create wide, level surfaces for gardens and agricultural areas as well as extraordinary views.

The spring Horace loved so much, the fons Bandusiae, is likely to be that which still pours out above the villa. The Orsini family owned the site from the 12th century and transformed the spring into a picturesque nymphaeum in the 17th century which still exists.

=== The villa ===
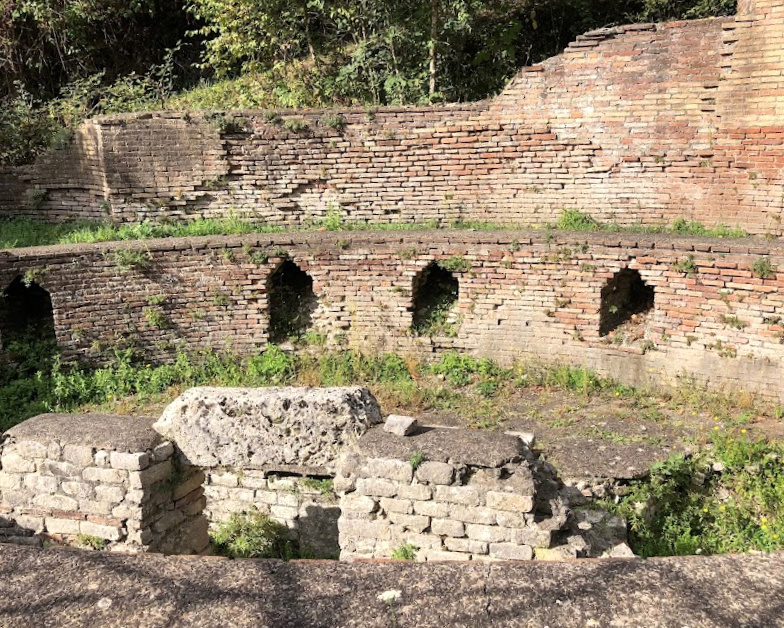
Laconicum

The later villa's overall plan is a rectangle of about 43 x 113 m in which a garden area of 43 x 85 m with surrounding porticos is attached to a residential area on a higher level to the north by the so-called veranda, the northern portico at the same level as the residence. Along the western side and outside this rectangle is the later bath complex. The overall size of the baths seems to be much larger than the residential area, but the living quarters were almost certainly more extensive to the north than can be seen today. Black and white mosaics from the Flavian dynasty, marble wall revetment and architectonic elements, an elaborate water system, have been found.

The villa began more modestly in the Republican era and early empire (2nd c. BC to 1st c. AD) around an atrium (a space later divided into rooms 38–40) and smaller garden and pool.

=== The baths ===
The first baths were in rooms 32–34 joining the north wall of the atrium. The baths' second building phase was mainly in the southern part, which including a second series of heated rooms over the original atrium and the laconicum (room 53) of considerable architectural importance.

The laconicum (dry heat room) or sudatorium (steam room) is the most attractive and monumental building of the site, owing to its intact state and unusual form. It is elliptical in plan with four semicircular niches and with three internal floor levels. The underground tunnel which goes to the centre of the room is the access for heating the building via the hypocaust. The subfloors supporting the small piers for the suspended floors are at two separate levels to match the high step within the laconicum. The internal elliptical wall supported the upper floor at the level of the north door. Although laconica are fairly common in the imperial period, the originality of this design is notable and similar only to the Forum Baths at Ostia Antica and the so-called Heliocaminus Baths at Hadrian’s Villa.

=== The garden ===
The garden was designed along an axis which maximised views of the surrounding countryside. Purpose-made plantpots, planting pits, and reused amphorae were placed parallel to the central axis of the garden on the west side and the design was supported by a parallel line of a gravel.

=== Finds ===
Finds are on display in the local museum of Licenza. A sign of the luxurious decoration of the villa is the spectacular Rosone Lacunare, a beautiful marble ceiling rose carved with acanthus leaves, frogs and crabs.

== History ==
=== Background ===
In the triangular zone between the Via Valeria passing through Mandela and Vicovaro, and the town and valley of Licenza, at least 12 villas have been identified dating from the second or first century BC, 8 being in the area of Mandela.

The area prospered in the Augustan era; the nearby towns of Varia and Trebula Suffenas were thriving (attested by inscriptions and monuments), and the two aqueducts (the Anio Vetus and Aqua Marcia) passing nearby were restored. At Tivoli, the patrician elite began to build large otium villas, the largest of which (the villa of Quintilius Varus) became an imperial property. Writers such as Catullus and Tibullus began to own villas in the Tivoli area, continuing for a century and attracted perhaps by the great library housed in the Sanctuary of Hercules Victor. The mid- to late 1st-century AD phase of Horace's Villa is the northernmost example of several luxury villas rebuilt over earlier ones, and is separated from its neighbour by a valley, the Fosso delle Mogli.

=== The Villa ===
Excavations have shown that the villa developed in several stages:

- In the 1st century BC the original site plan was quite different from the later one: the villa with an atrium was in areas 38-39-40 (on the site of the future baths) and a water basin was built in area 12 (in the future residential area), together with the long opus incertum wall along the western side of the future quadriporticus. An owner of this period was Manius Naevius.
- before about 75 AD, the water basin was covered by a new building, the first phase (19-20-21) of new residential rooms on the north side was built and somewhere on the site floors of opus sectile using palombino antico marble and slate were laid. An owner in this period at least until her suicide in 65 AD is Claudia Epicharis, a freed slave who was part of the conspiracy against emperor Nero It is speculated, due to the owners and the renovations, that the villa became imperial property in the early 1st century AD due to the imperial connections of the owners. This would also fit with the fact that when Horace died in 8 BC, he left his entire estate to Augustus It was first rented out to tenants or left empty, and then was given to the imperial freedman Tiberius Claudius Abascantus, Epicharis’s husband, and an official in Nero’s treasury who was rich enough to make the expensive enhancements. After Abascantus’s and Epicharis’s deaths, it reverted to the emperor and was given soon afterwards to Tiberius Claudius Parthenius.
- before 110, there was considerable construction with the addition of the first baths (rooms 32-34), rooms 20-21 were converted for the baths, the atrium in 38-40 was buried beneath the higher mosaic floor of a frigidarium (built over mid-first century AD fresco fragments used as fill) for the baths and a plunge bath built in a new room (37). A quadriporticus was built around the garden whose level was raised and pool (25) was built in the middle of the garden. The slope on the north side was levelled creating the wider terrace for the enlarged living quarters with mosaics in rooms 1, 4, 11, 16, 26, and 27 and another water feature was added in the centre of Area 8. The ornamental structure (possibly a nymphaeum) in the middle of the eastern portico was added on the axis of the pool (25). One important owner in this period is Tiberius Claudius Burrus, son of Tiberius Claudius Parthenius, imperial freedman and chamberlain (and assassin) of Domitian
- In 130-150 the luxuriousness of the villa was increased further: new rooms (41-49, 51-53) were added to the south of the baths, making a second thermal bath suite, and new mosaics were laid in rooms 38-39-40 and exotic marbles, similar to those at nearby Hadrian’s Villa, decorated other rooms. An owner then was P. Hostilius Firminus, a senator mentioned by Pliny, or a relative.
- From 200-370 the villa was largely unchanged until during the 4th century the villa fell into disrepair; part of the baths was no longer used and human burials were made there
- after 370 the villa was abandoned.
