= Dampierre-lès-Conflans =

- Commune
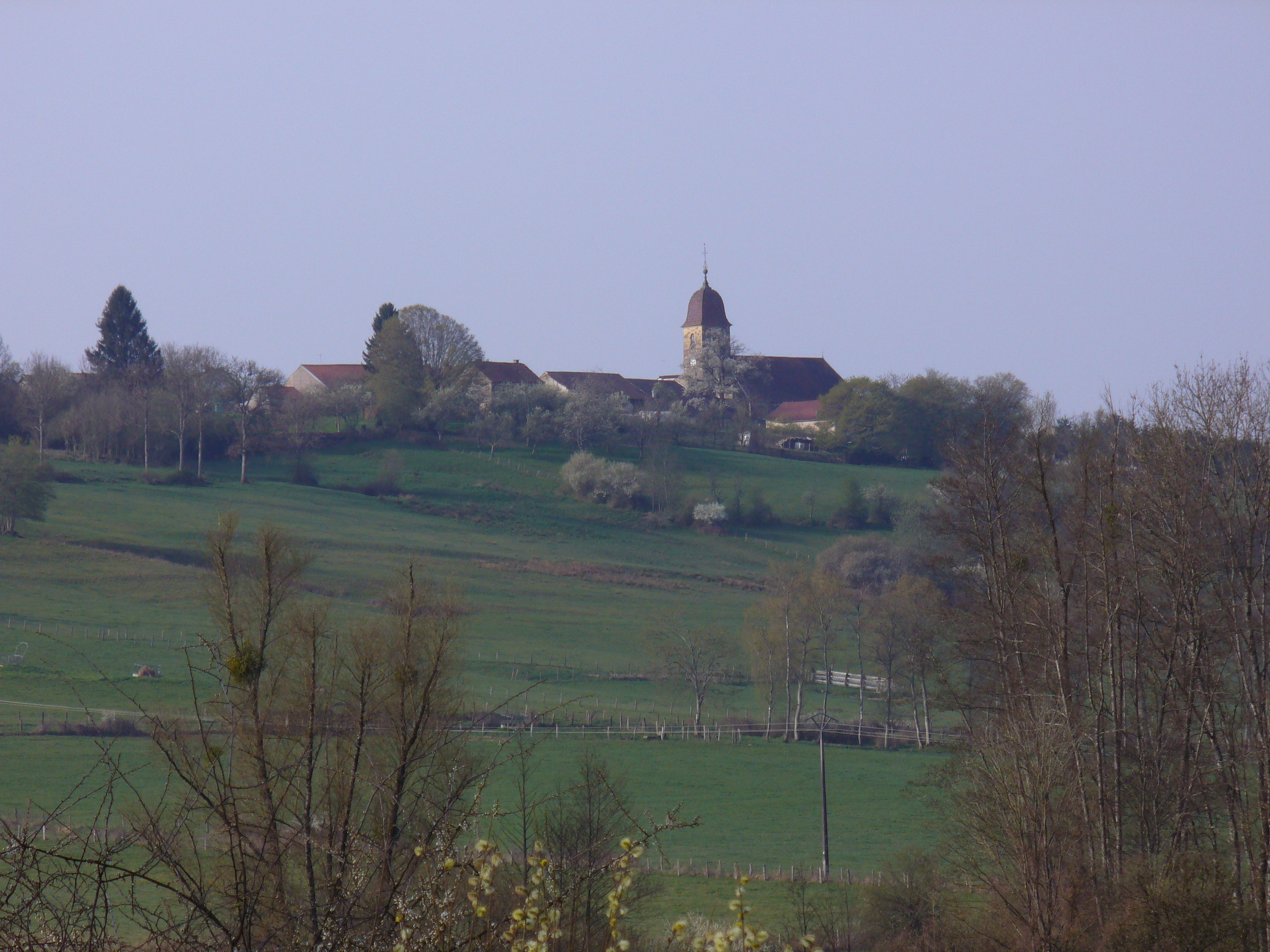
- A general view of Dampierre-lès-Conflans
- Location of Dampierre-lès-Conflans
- Location within France Location within Bourgogne-Franche-Comté
- Coordinates: 47°50′56″N 6°11′09″E
- Country: France
- Region: Bourgogne-Franche-Comté
- Department: Haute-Saône
- Arrondissement: Lure
- Canton: Port-sur-Saône

Government
  - Mayor (2020–2026): Ghislain Jacquey
- Area^{1}: 10.37 km^{2} (4.00 sq mi)
- Highest elevation: 328 m (1,076 ft)
- Lowest elevation: 227 m (745 ft)
- Population (2023): 264
  - Density: 25.5/km^{2} (65.9/sq mi)
- Time zone: UTC+01:00 (CET)
  - Summer (DST): UTC+02:00 (CEST)
- INSEE/Postal code: 70196 /70800
- ^{1} French Land Register data, which excludes lakes, ponds, glaciers > 1 km^{2} (0.386 sq mi or 247 acres) and river estuaries.

Dampierre-lès-Conflans (French pronunciation: [dɑ̃pjɛʁ lɛ kɔ̃flɑ̃], literally Dampierre near Conflans) is a commune in the Haute-Saône department in the region of Bourgogne-Franche-Comté in eastern France.

== Twin towns ==
- Roccagiovine, Italy

== See also ==
- Communes of the Haute-Saône department
