= 597 Bandusia =

Main-belt asteroid

Discovery
- Discovered by: Max Wolf
- Discovery site: Heidelberg
- Discovery date: 16 April 1906

Designations
- Pronunciation: /bændjuːziə/
- Alternative designations: 1906 UB

Orbital characteristics
- Epoch 31 July 2016 (JD 2457600.5)
- Uncertainty parameter 0
- Observation arc: 99.42 yr (36314 d)
- Aphelion: 3.0584 AU (457.53 Gm)
- Perihelion: 2.2845 AU (341.76 Gm)
- Semi-major axis: 2.6714 AU (399.64 Gm)
- Eccentricity: 0.14486
- Orbital period (sidereal): 4.37 yr (1594.8 d)
- Mean anomaly: 337.296°
- Mean motion: 0° 13^{m} 32.628^{s} / day
- Inclination: 12.804°
- Longitude of ascending node: 36.541°
- Argument of perihelion: 307.653°

Physical characteristics
- Mean radius: 18.03±1.75 km
- Synodic rotation period: 15.340 h (0.6392 d)
- Geometric albedo: 0.2361±0.053
- Absolute magnitude (H): 9.1

597 Bandusia is a minor planet orbiting the Sun.
