= Spring of Bandusium =

Geographic feature

Horace Odes 3.13

O fons Bandusiae splendidior vitro
dulci digne mero non sine floribus,
cras donaberis haedo,
cui frons turgida cornibus
primis et venerem et proelia destinat;
frustra: nam gelidos inficiet tibi
rubro sanguine rivos
lascivi suboles gregis.
te flagrantis atrox hora Caniculae
nescit tangere, tu frigus amabile
fessis vomere tauris
praebes et pecori vago.
fies nobilium tu quoque fontium
me dicente cavis impositam ilicem
saxis, unde loquaces
lymphae desiliunt tuae.

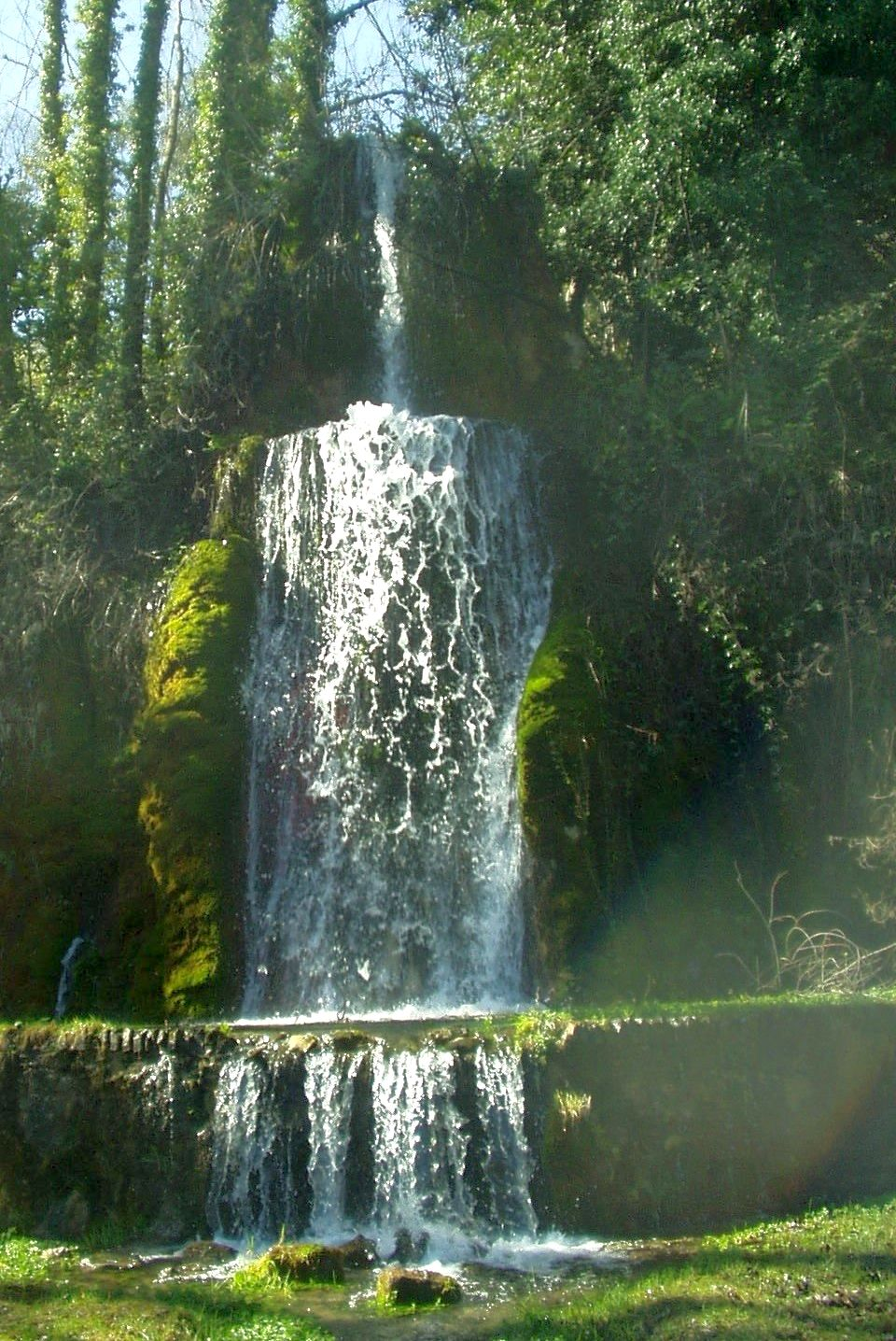
Fons bandusiae

The Spring of Bandusium (Latin: fons Bandusiae) is a natural water source in rural Italy, to which the Roman poet Horace addressed a well-known ode (Odes 3.13). The location is thought to be the site of poet's beloved Sabine farm in what is now the commune of Licenza. In the poem Horace promises to sacrifice a young goat to the spring and praises the spring's constancy in the hottest days of summer. The poem ends with Horace promising to immortalize the spring through his song.

== Location ==
Recent scholarship suggests that Horace may have named a pleasant spring near his Sabine farm after a similar spring in the vicinity of his native Venusia.

Evidence that the original Fons Bandusiae may have been located in Apulia, near Horace's childhood home, comes from a papal bull of Paschal II, dating to 1103. This bull mentions a "church of the Holy Martyrs Gervasius and Protasius at the Bandusine spring in Venusia" (ecclesia sanctorum martyrum Gervasii et Protasii in Bandusino fonte apud Venusiam). Travelers have proposed the village of Palazzo San Gervasio, 13 km east of Venusia, as the probable location of the church but failed to match any of the nearby springs with Horace's description.

== See also ==
- Lucretilis Mons
