= Roccagiovine =

- Comune
- Comune di Roccagiovine
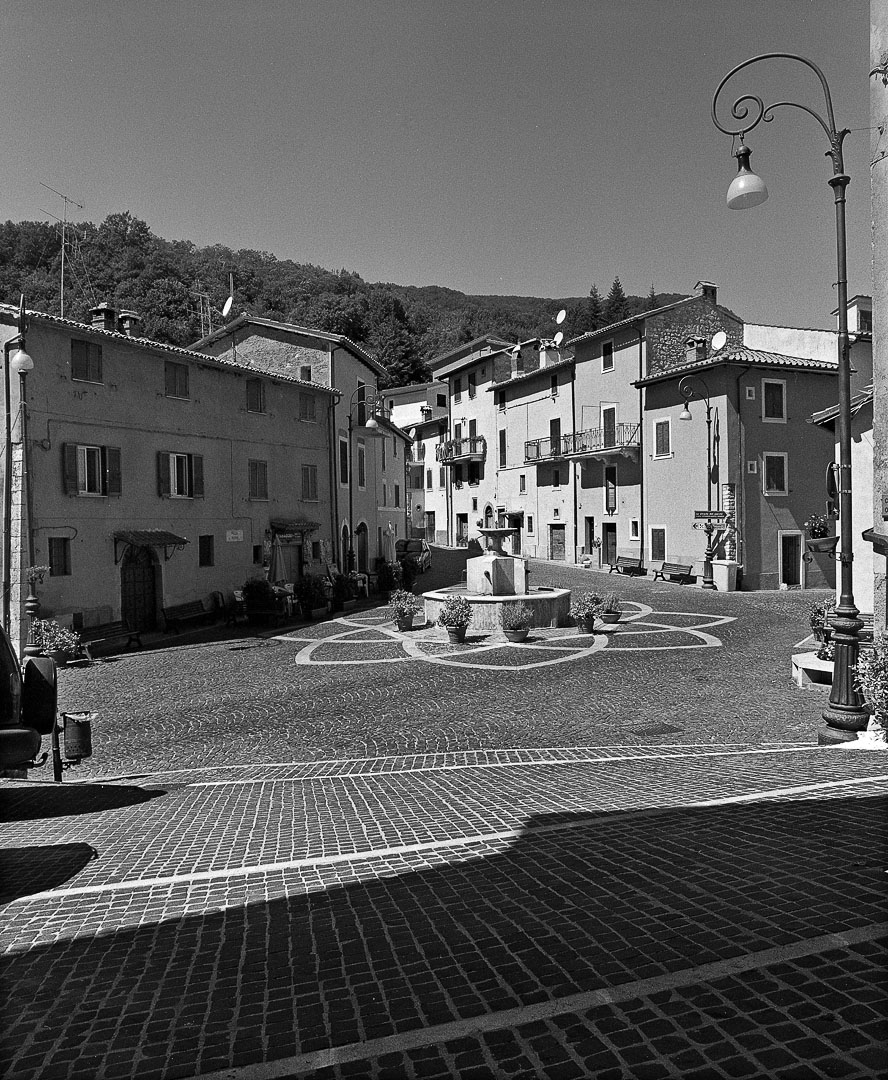
- View of Roccagiovine

- Coat of arms

- Location within Italy Location within Lazio
- Coordinates: 42°3′N 12°54′E
- Country: Italy
- Region: Lazio
- Metropolitan city: Rome (RM)

Government
  - Mayor: Marco Bernardi

Area
  - Total: 8.41 km^{2} (3.25 sq mi)
- Elevation: 520 m (1,710 ft)

Population (1 January 2016)
  - Total: 263
  - Density: 31.3/km^{2} (81.0/sq mi)
- Demonym: Roccatani
- Time zone: UTC+1 (CET)
  - Summer (DST): UTC+2 (CEST)
- Postal code: 00020
- Dialing code: 0774
- Patron saint: St. Nicholas of Bari
- Website: Official website

Roccagiovine (in Romanesco simply known as Rocca) is a comune (municipality) in the Metropolitan City of Rome in the Italian region of Latium, located about 35 kilometres (22 mi) northeast of Rome. It is included in the Natural Park of the Monti Lucretili.

The ancient town was known by the Romans as Fanum Vacunae.

A Roman inscription found here enabled identification of Horace's Villa nearby.

== Twin towns ==
- Dampierre-lès-Conflans, France
