= Pomponius Porphyrion =

3rd-century Latin grammarian

Pomponius Porphyrion (or Porphyrio) was a Latin grammarian and commentator on Horace.

== Biography ==
He was possibly a native of Africa, and flourished during the 3rd century A.D.

== Works ==
His scholia on Horace, which are still extant, mainly consist of rhetorical and grammatical explanations. The original work probably has not survived, as it most likely suffered from alterations and interpolations at the hands of the copyists of the Middle Ages, but on the whole the scholia form a valuable aid to the student of Horace.

== Editions ==
- Acronis et Porphyrionis commentarii in Q. Horatium Flaccum. Edidit Ferdinandus Hauthal, vol. 1, vol. 2, Berolini sumptibus Julii Springeri, 1864.
- Pomponii Porhyrionis commentarii in Q. Horatium Flaccum, recensuit Gulielmus Meyer spirensis, Lipsiae in aedibus B. G. Teubneri, 1874.
- Pomponi Porfyrionis commentum in Horatium Flaccum, A. Holder, ed., Arno Press, 1894.

See also C. F. Urba, Meletemata porphyrionea (1885).
