= Penitent Magdalene (Titian, 1550) =

Painting by Titian

- Artist: Titian
- Year: c. 1550
- Medium: Oil on canvas
- Dimensions: 122 cm × 94 cm (48 in × 37 in)
- Location: Museo di Capodimonte; Naples

Penitent Magdalene is a c. 1550 oil on canvas painting by Titian, now in the Museo di Capodimonte in Naples.

== Variants ==
The painting's history is confused by the existence of several copies and variants - it and Danaë are the commonest subjects in Titian's oeuvre. Vasari's Lives of the Artists mentions several copies of the Penitent Magdalene, the oldest of them (the only pre-Tridentine of the four) was then in the 'guardaroba' of the Duke of Urbino and later came to Florence as part of Vittoria Della Rovere's dowry in 1631. Another version was acquired by a Venetian nobleman for 100 ducats, forcing Titian quickly to produce a third variant in 1561 to meet a commission from Philip II of Spain - this showed the saint clothed and later passed to a British collection, where it was destroyed by fire, though a copy by Luca Giordano survives in the Escorial.

The third variant in particular was such as success that a fourth one was made in 1567 - this was delivered to cardinal Alessandro Farnese the Younger, who was supposed to then pass it to Pope Pius V. A 19th century critic identified the version now in Naples as being the 1567 work, but it is now thought to be the one sent to Cardinal Alessandro Farnese in or around 1547.

== History ==
The 1644 and 1653 inventories of the Palazzo Farnese in Rome mention the work in place and attributes it to Titian. It was then moved to Parma, where it was recorded in 1680 at the Palazzo del Giardino and then in the Palazzo della Pilotta, both Farnese residences. Whilst there it was mentioned in Descrizione, a description of the 100 most prestigious works in Parma, published by Richardson in 1725.

In 1734 it and the rest of the Farnese Collection were moved to Naples straight after being inherited by the family's last heir Elisabetta then by her son Charles. Until 1765 the work was recorded as sited in the Reggia di Capodimonte and in 1767 it was moved to the rooms in the Palazzo Reale in Naples before returning to the Reggia in 1783. When the Parthenopean Republic was declared in 1799 French troops looted the Magdalene as one of around 300 paintings with Farnese provenance from the Capodimonte (it then solely housed works from that collection). In 1800 Ferdinand IV ordered emissary Domenico Venuti to get back all the works thus taken from Naples - he managed to find the Magdalene as well as Titian's Portrait of Cardinal Alessandro Farnese. The former was found in storage at the church of San Luigi dei Francesi in Rome along with all the other works France looted in Italy by France, where they were awaiting being taken to Paris.

It was temporarily hung in Naples' palazzo Francavilla until Ferdinand had to flee to Palermo when France established the Kingdom of Naples in 1806, upon which he took with him Titian's Magdalene, Portrait of Pope Paul III, Pope Paul III and His Grandsons and Danae to keep them out of enemy hands. When the Bourbons were restored in 1815 the canvas returned to the Capodimonte.

== See also ==
- List of works by Titian

== Bibliography ==
- (in Italian) Touring Club Italiano, Museo di Capodimonte, Milano, Touring Club Editore, 2012, ISBN 978-88-365-2577-5.
- (in Italian) Guida al Museo Nazionale di Capodimonte, Editrice Electa, 2006.
- (in Italian) AA. VV., I Farnese. Arte e collezionismo, Milano, Editrice Electa, 1995, ISBN 978-8843551323.
- (in Italian) AA. VV., Tiziano e il ritratto di corte da Raffaello ai Carracci, Napoli, Editrice Electa, 2006, ISBN 978-8851003364.
