= Portrait of Pope Paul III with Camauro =

Painting by Titian

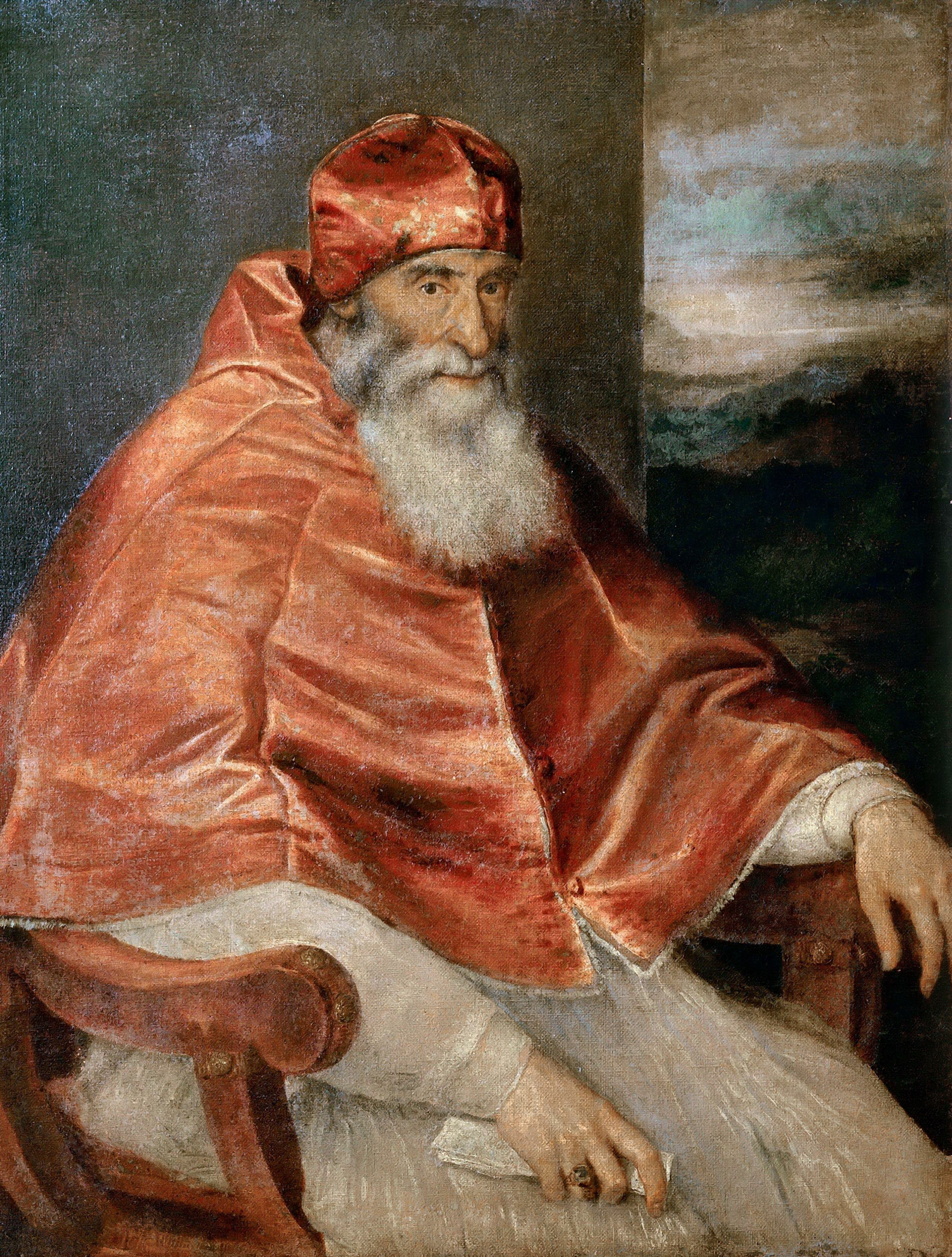
- Artist: Titian
- Year: c. 1545-1546
- Medium: oil on canvas
- Dimensions: 113.7 cm × 88.8 cm (44.8 in × 35.0 in)
- Location: Museo di Capodimonte, Naples

Portrait of Pope Paul III with Camauro (or Portrait of Pope Paul III with Cap) is an oil on canvas painting by Titian, from c. 1545-1546. It is held in the Museo nazionale di Capodimonte, in Naples.

== History ==
Judging by the relative apparent ages of the pope in the three works, the canvas was produced immediately after the Portrait of Pope Paul III (the first official version of the work) and before the Portrait of Pope Paul III with his Grandsons. This assumption is fundamentally based on the age that transpires from the figure of Paul III, who appears to be more advanced than that of the official portrait, already seventy-five, while it is less so than that where the pontiff himself appears with his two grandsons. According to Vasari's Lives of the Artists it was produced for cardinal camerlengo Guido Ascanio Sforza di Santa Fiora, president of the Apostolic Camera and grandson of its subject. Unlike the 1543 version it shows its subject wearing the papal camauro, has a scroll replacing the ring on his hand and a landscape on one side of the background. Versions of this work showing the camauro also survive in the Kunsthistorisches Museum in Vienna and the Hermitage Museum in Saint Petersburg, both of these may or may not be autograph works.

== Provenance ==
The painting now in Naples was then owned by Fulvio Orsini, collector and librarian to the Farnese family, then to Odoardo Farnese, who added it to the other portraits of his family by Titian at the Palazzo Farnese in Rome. In the 17th century it and all the other works in the Farnese Collection in Rome were moved to Parma, where it hung in a room alongside the same artist's Portrait of Cardinal Alessandro Farnese and Portrait of Pier Luigi Farnese before being moved to the Palazzo della Pilotta in the same city. When Charles of Bourbon succeeded to the throne on the death of his mother Elisabeth Farnese, this work and the rest of the collection were moved to Naples around 1734. It was initially displayed at the Palace of Capodimonte, then in the Royal Palace, then in the Palazzo degli Studi and finally returned to Capodimonte. This work and the Portrait of Pier Luigi Farnese were both demoted to studio-work status due to their poor condition, but a major mid 20th century restoration and investigation of the Portrait of Pope Paul III with Camauro placed its colours on new supports and reconfirmed the work's autograph status.
