= Giacomo Orsini =

Giacomo Orsini or Jacopo Orsini may refer to:

- Giacomo Orsini (cardinal) (1340–1379)
- Giacomo Orsini, Count of Tagliacozzo (died 1431)
- Jacopo Orsini, Lord of Monterotondo (1424–1482)
- Giacomo Orsini (bishop) (fl. 1497–1530)

== See also ==
- Orsini family
