= Diocese of Bitonto =

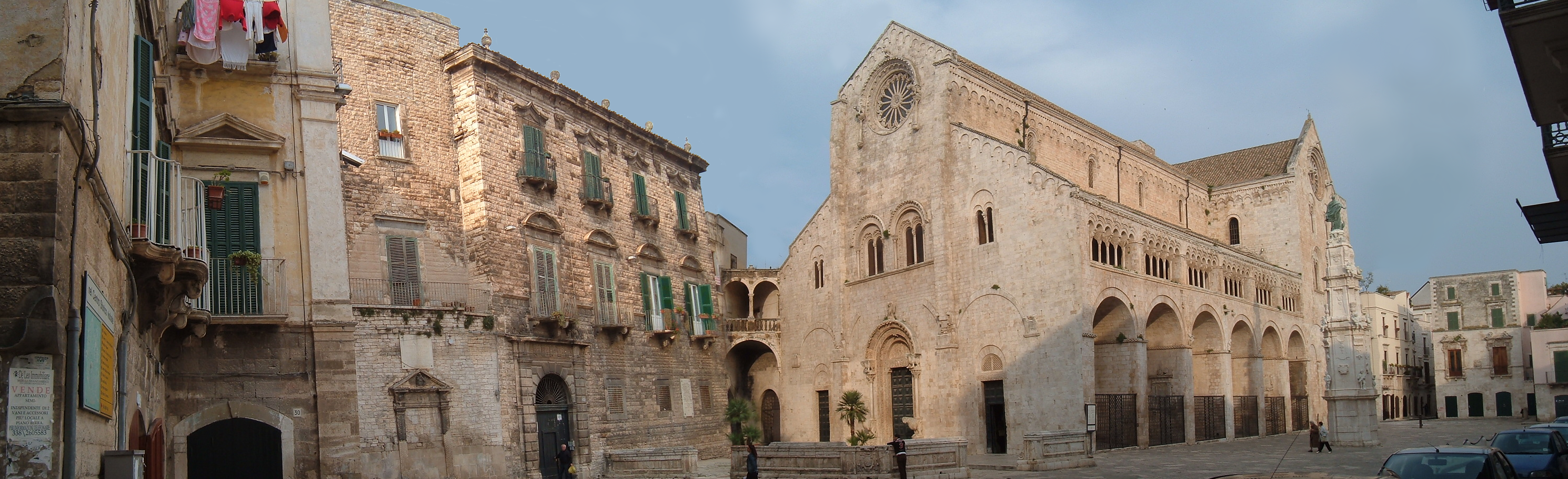
Bitonto Cathedral

The Italian Catholic diocese of Bitonto, in Apulia, had a short independent existence from 1982 to 1986. In the latter year it was united into the Archdiocese of Bari, forming the Archdiocese of Bari-Bitonto. Before 1982, it had existed since the 9th century until being united into the diocese of Ruvo e Bitonto in 1818.

== Ordinaries ==
=== Diocese of Bitonto ===
Erected: 9th Century
Metropolitan: Archdiocese of Bari (-Canosa)

- Bishop Anderano (c. 734; belonged either to Bitonto or the diocese of Bisignano)
- Arnolfo (1087)
- Enrico Minutoli (1382 - 1383 Appointed Archbishop of Trani)

...

- Battista Pontini (1484 - 1500 Died)
- Giambattista Orsini (12 June 1501 - 20 Dec 1501), administrator
- Giovanni Francesco de Orsini (20 Dec 1501 - 1517 Resigned)
- Giulio de' Medici (18 Feb 1517 - 27 Feb 1517 Resigned)
- Giacomo Orsini (27 Feb 1517 - 24 Jan 1530 Resigned)
- Alessandro Farnese (seniore) (24 Jan 1530 - 17 May 1532 Resigned)
- Lópe de Alarcón (17 May 1532 - 1537 Resigned)
- Alessandro Farnese (iuniore) (17 Jun 1537 - 8 Jan 1538 Resigned)
- Sebastiano Deli di Castel Durante (11 Jan 1538 - 1544 Died)
- Alessandro Farnese (iuniore) (1544 - 27 Oct 1544 Resigned)
- Cornelio Musso (27 Oct 1544 - 13 Jan 1574 Died)
- Giovanni Pietro Fortiguerra (26 Apr 1574 - 1593 Died)
- Flaminio Parisio (17 Sep 1593 - 1603 Died)
- Girolamo Bernardino Pallantieri (10 Sep 1603 - 23 Aug 1619 Died)
- Giovanni Battista Stella (13 Nov 1619 - 15 Dec 1621 Died)
- Fabrizio Carafa (24 Jan 1622 - Mar 1651 Died)
- Alessandro Crescenzi (26 Aug 1652 - 14 May 1668 Resigned)
- Tommaso Acquaviva d'Aragona (14 May 1668 - 23 Aug 1672 Died)
- Francesco Antonio Gallo (3 Oct 1672 - Sep 1685 Died)
- Filippo Massarenghi (13 May 1686 - 5 Jun 1688 Died)
- Carlo de Ferrari (6 Jun 1689 - Nov 1698 Died)
- Giovanni Battista Capano (21 Jun 1700 - 14 Jan 1720 Died)
- Domenico Maria Cedronio (20 Mar 1720 - May 1722 Died)
- Luca Antonio della Gatta (6 Jul 1722 - 8 Jul 1737 Appointed, Bishop of Melfi e Rapolla)
- Giovanni Barba (8 Jul 1737 - 13 Dec 1749 Died)
- Nicola Ferri (23 Feb 1750 - 28 May 1770 Appointed, Bishop of Satriano e Campagna)
- Orazio Berarducci (28 May 1770 - 1801 Died)

27 June 1818: United with Diocese of Ruvo to form the Diocese of Ruvo e Bitonto

=== Diocese of Bitonto ===
30 September 1982: Re-established from the Diocese of Ruvo e Bitonto

- Andrea Mariano Magrassi (30 Sep 1982 - 30 Sep 1986 Appointed, Archbishop of Bari-Bitonto)

30 September 1986: United with Archdiocese of Bari (-Canosa) to form the Archdiocese of Bari-Bitonto

== Auxiliary Bishops ==
- Domenico Padovano (1984 to 30 Sep 1986)
