= Tommaso Acquaviva d'Aragona =

Most Reverend Tommaso Acquaviva d'Aragona
- Bishop of Bitonto
- Church: Catholic Church
- Diocese: Diocese of Bitonto
- In office: 1668–1672
- Predecessor: Alessandro Crescenzi (cardinal)
- Successor: Francesco Antonio Gallo

Orders
- Consecration: 21 May 1668 by Francesco Maria Brancaccio

Personal details
- Born: 1600 Nardo, Italy
- Died: August 23, 1672 (aged 71–72) Bitonto, Italy

Tommaso Acquaviva d'Aragona, O.P. (1600 – 23 August 1672) was a Roman Catholic prelate who served as Bishop of Bitonto (1668–1672).

== Biography ==
Tommaso Acquaviva d'Aragona was born in Nardo, Italy in 1600 and ordained a priest in the Order of Preachers. On 14 May 1668, he was appointed during the papacy of Pope Clement IX as Bishop of Bitonto. On 21 May 1668, he was consecrated bishop by Francesco Maria Brancaccio, Cardinal-Bishop of Frascati, with Stefano Brancaccio, Titular Archbishop of Hadrianopolis in Haemimonto, and Giuseppe della Corgna, Bishop of Orvieto, serving as co-consecrators. He served as Bishop of Bitonto until his death on 23 August 1672.

== External links and additional sources ==
- Cheney, David M. "Diocese of Bitonto". Catholic-Hierarchy.org. (for Chronology of Bishops)
- Chow, Gabriel. "Diocese of Bitonto (Italy)". GCatholic.org. (for Chronology of Bishops)

Catholic Church titles
| Preceded by Alessandro Crescenzi (cardinal) | Bishop of Bitonto; 1668–1672 | Succeeded by Francesco Antonio Gallo |
