= Giacomo Orsini (bishop) =

16th-century Roman Catholic bishop

Most Reverend Giacomo Orsini
- Bishop of Bitonto
- Church: Catholic Church
- Diocese: Diocese of Bitonto
- In office: 1517–1530
- Predecessor: Giulio de' Medici
- Successor: Alessandro Farnese

Personal details
- Born: 1497
- Died: Unknown

Giacomo Orsini (1497–?) was a Roman Catholic prelate who served as Bishop of Bitonto (1517–1530).

== Biography ==
Giacomo Orsini was born in 1497. On 27 Feb 1517, he was appointed during the papacy of Pope Leo X as Bishop of Bitonto, He served as Bishop of Bitonto until his resignation on 24 Jan 1530 .

== External links and additional sources ==
- Cheney, David M. "Diocese of Bitonto". Catholic-Hierarchy.org. (for Chronology of Bishops) ^{[self-published]}
- Chow, Gabriel. "Diocese of Bitonto (Italy)". GCatholic.org. (for Chronology of Bishops) ^{[self-published]}

Catholic Church titles
Preceded by Giulio de' Medici	Bishop of Bitonto; 1517–1530	Succeeded by Alessandro Farnese
