= Pope Paul III and His Grandsons =

Triple 1546 portrait by Titian now in Naples

- Artist: Titian
- Year: 1545-1546
- Medium: oil on canvas
- Dimensions: 210 cm × 176 cm (83 in × 69 in)
- Location: Museo di Capodimonte, Naples

Pope Paul III and His Grandsons (Italian: Papa Paolo III e i nipoti) is an oil on canvas painting by Titian, housed in the Museo di Capodimonte, Naples. It was commissioned by the Farnese family and painted during Titian's visit to Rome between autumn 1545 and June 1546. It depicts the scabrous relationship between Pope Paul III and his grandsons, Ottavio and Alessandro Farnese. Ottavio is shown in the act of kneeling, to his left; Alessandro, wearing a cardinal's dress, stands behind him to his right. The painting explores the effects of ageing and the manoeuvring behind succession; Paul was at the time in his late seventies and ruling in an uncertain political climate as Charles V, Holy Roman Emperor came into ascendancy.

Paul was not a religious man; he viewed the papacy as a means to consolidate his family's position. He appointed Alessandro as cardinal against accusations of nepotism, fathered a number of illegitimate children, and spent large sums of church money collecting art and antiquities. Around 1545 Charles took the political and military advantage, weakening Paul's hold on the papacy. Aware of the changing tides of influence, Titian abandoned the commission before completion, and for the next 100 years the painting languished unframed in a Farnese cellar.

Pope Paul III and His Grandsons ranks as one of Titian's finest and most penetrating works. Although unfinished and less technically accomplished than his Portrait of Pope Paul III of a few years earlier, it is renowned for its rich colouring; the deep reds of the tablecloth and the almost spectral whites of Paul's gown. The panel contains subtle indications of the contradictions in the character of the Pope, and captures the complex psychological dynamic between the three men.

== Background ==
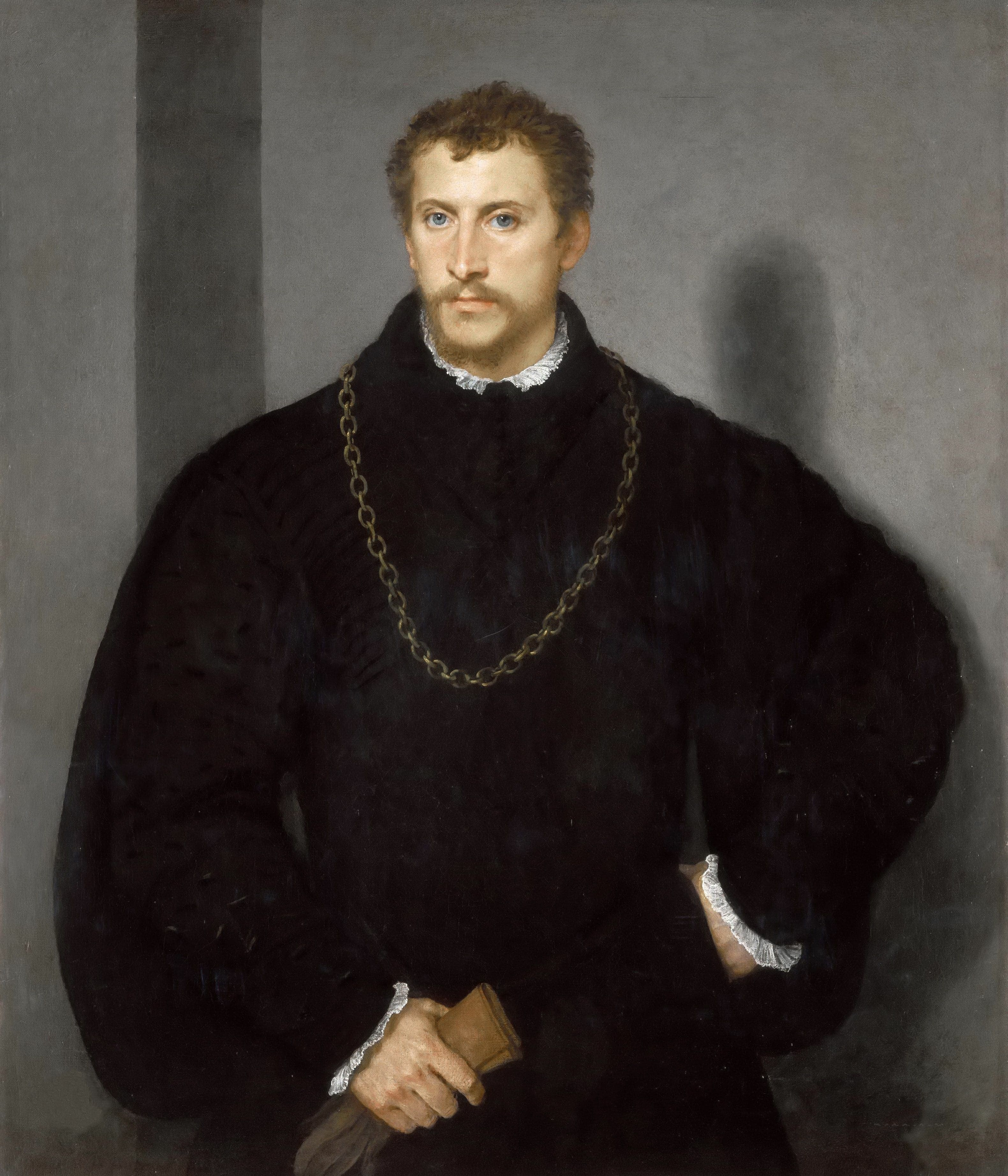
Possible portrait of Ottavio Farnese by Titian, 1540–45, known as Portrait of a Young Englishman. Ottavio proved himself a formidable man in his own right, earning the Order of the Golden Fleece from Charles, and becoming a Chevalier in 1547.

Paul III was the last of the popes appointed by the ruling Medici family of Florence. He was socially ambitious, a careerist and not particularly pious. He kept a concubine, fathered four children out of wedlock and viewed the throne as an opportunity to fill his coffers while he placed his relatives in high positions. A talented and cunning political operator, Paul was precisely the sort of man the Florentines needed to assist them in their defence against French and Spanish threats.

He became pope in 1534 when he was 66 years old, and immediately appointed members of his family to key positions. He anointed his eldest grandson Alessandro, the eldest child of his illegitimate son Pier Luigi, cardinal at the age of 14, marking a break with the Farnese tradition of marrying off the first-born to carry on the family name. This move was considered necessary because the next oldest grandson, Ottavio, was then just 10 years old; such a young cardinal would have been politically unacceptable. Paul's advanced years meant that the family could ill afford to wait until the younger brother was of age. Thus Alessandro became a cardinal deacon; this appointment did not necessitate taking major orders, but it compelled him to celibacy and to forgo the rights of primogeniture, which instead went to Ottavio. Alessandro was to bitterly regret the obligations. Paul appointed Ottavio as Duke of Camerino in 1538, and in the same year married him to Charles V's daughter, Margaret, later Margaret of Parma. Both of Paul's grandsons' advancements were widely criticised as evidence of nepotism.

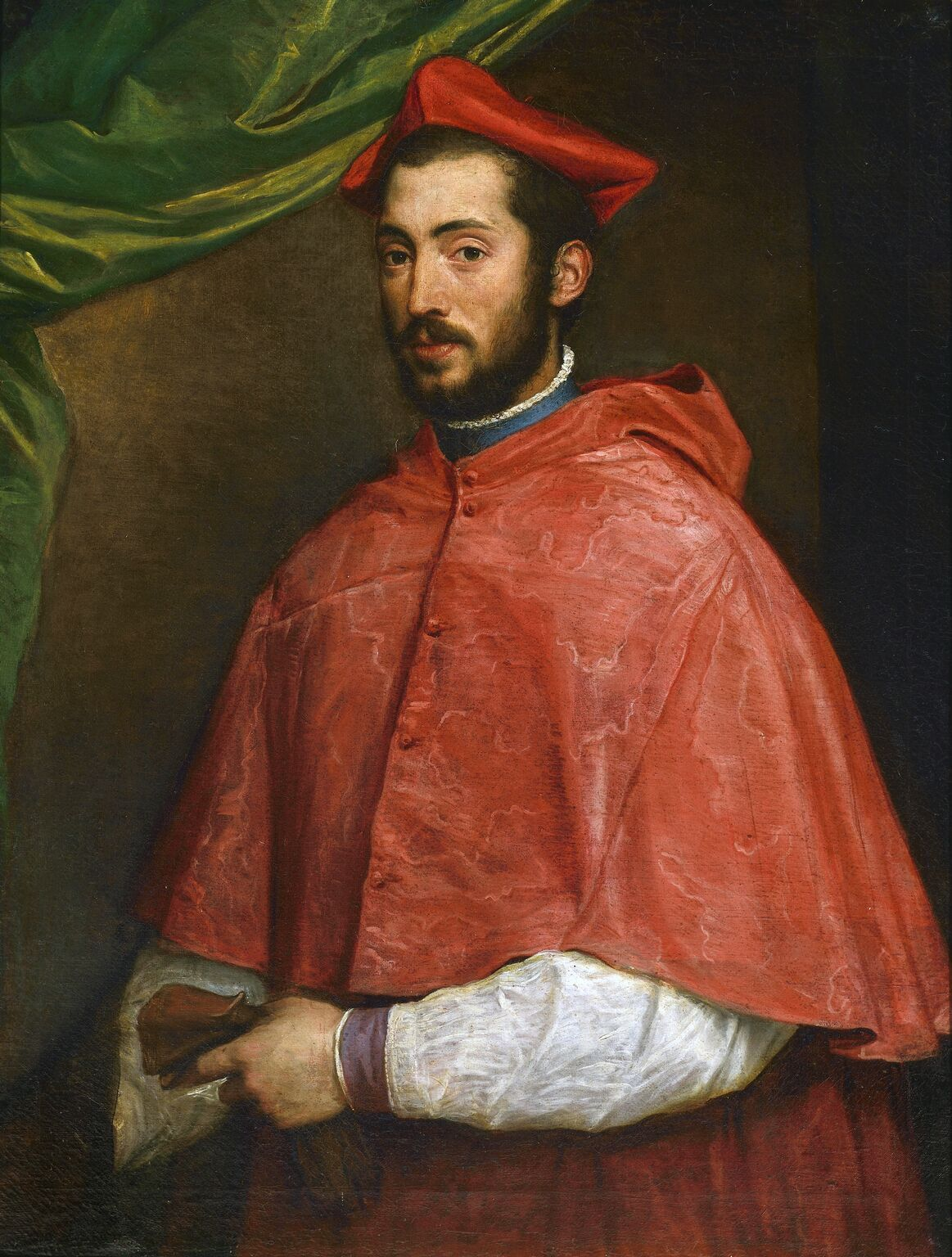
Portrait of Cardinal Alessandro Farnese, Titian, 1545–1546. Museo di Capodimonte.

Ottavio's marriage troubled Alessandro; he struggled with the burden of chastity and entertained fantasies of marrying a princess. He resented his younger brother's arrangement; during the wedding ceremony he "became more deathly pale than death itself, and, so they say, is unable to bear this thing, that he, the first-born, should see himself deprived of such splendid status and of the daughter of an Emperor." In 1546 Paul gave Pier Luigi the duchies of Parma and Piacenza as papal fiefs, a highly political move by the pope: in doing so he gave titles and wealth to Pier and appointed a lord who was subservient and owed a debt of gratitude, guaranteeing that the duchies would remain under papal control. At the same time, Ottavio was posted to the North of Italy to support Charles. By 1546 Ottavio was 22 years old, married to Margaret of Austria and an accomplished and distinguished individual. In 1547 his father was assassinated and Ottavio claimed the dukedom of Parma and Piacenza against the express wishes of both Charles, his father-in-law, and Paul. In doing so, Ottavio acted in opposition to the pope's desire to maintain the duchies as papal fiefs, and to Charles, whom he believed responsible for the plot to assassinate Pier Luigi.

Titian was a personal friend of Charles; the commissioning of the portrait was most likely intended by Paul as a signal of allegiance to the emperor. Pressure from reforming monarchs in France and Spain, coupled with a general shift of influence in France's favour, ended the Farnese hold on the papacy soon after Paul's death. Ottavio excelled as a military commander and was awarded the Golden Fleece by the emperor. While the post had been given as a means to strengthen the family position, it did not come without cost. His success bred resentment amongst his family, as he began to see himself unaccountable to Rome.

At the time of the portrait Paul had convinced Alessandro to retain the post, hinting that he would later succeed him as pope – an aspiration that was ultimately frustrated. As Alessandro realised the emptiness of the promise he lost confidence in both his grandfather's word and political credibility.

== Commission ==
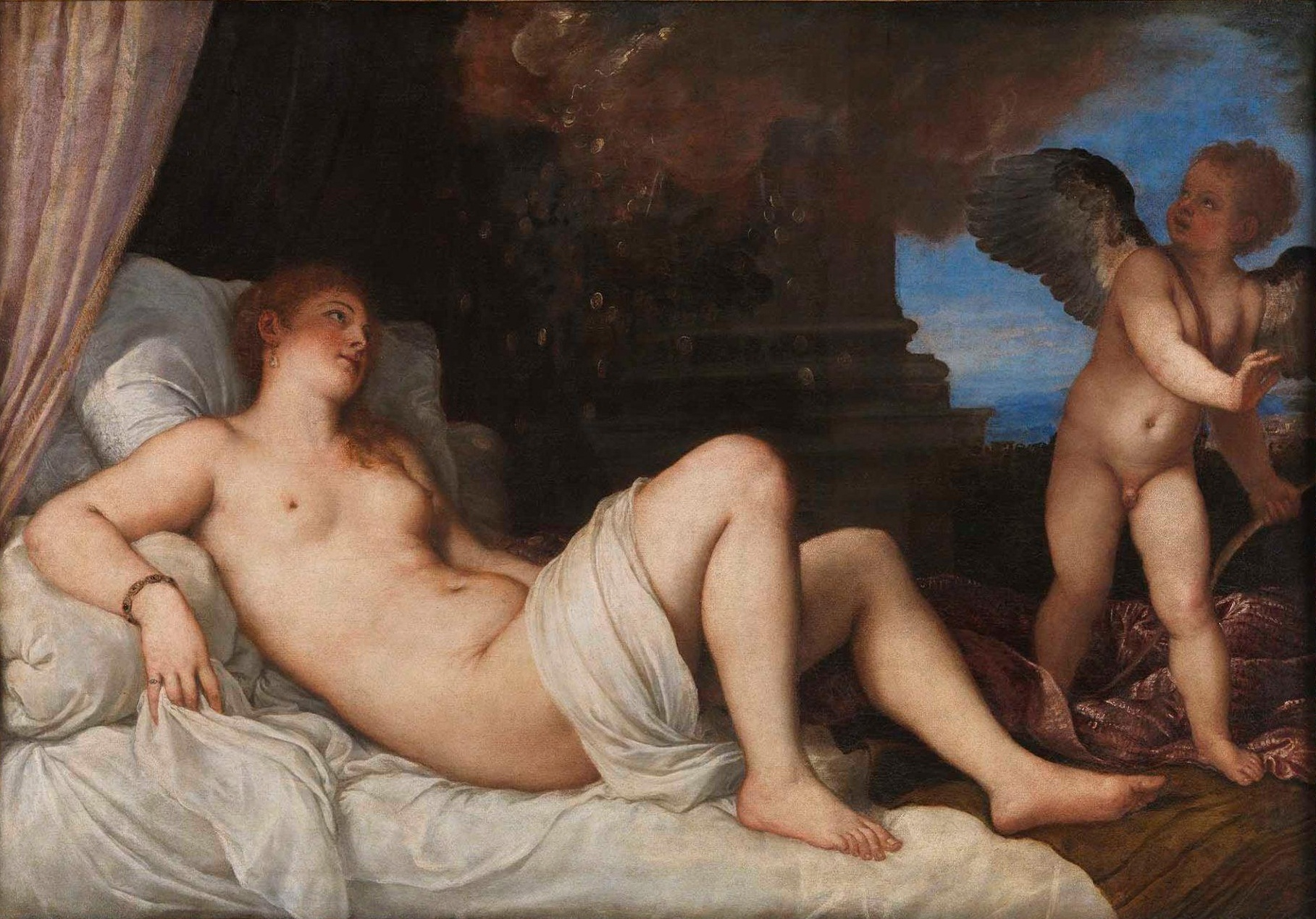
Danaë with Eros, 1544, National Museum of Capodimonte, Naples. The first of Titian's series, the work was commissioned by either Ottavio or Alessandro Farnese.

The painting was commissioned in 1546 after Titian had made a number of portraits of Paul. He had already depicted Pier Luigi and three of his children – Vittoria, Alessandro and Ranuccio. Ottavio was perhaps again portrayed by him in 1552, and most likely commissioned the original Naples panel in Titian's Danaë series, although Lodovico Dolce believed it was Alessandro who had approached Titian.

The artist's reputation was such that he had already been called to Rome a number of times in the early 1540s; first by Cardinal Pietro Bembo and then by the Farnese family. By the mid-1540s Titian was the preferred portraitist for the Farnese. Following a number of earlier portraits of Pier Luigi and Paul, they commissioned a set to mark their ascendancy after Paul's papacy, all of which were – given their political awareness and ambition – clearly intended as public statements on their social elevation. Paul was aware of Titian's influence in Venice, and after 1538 allowed only Titian to portray him.

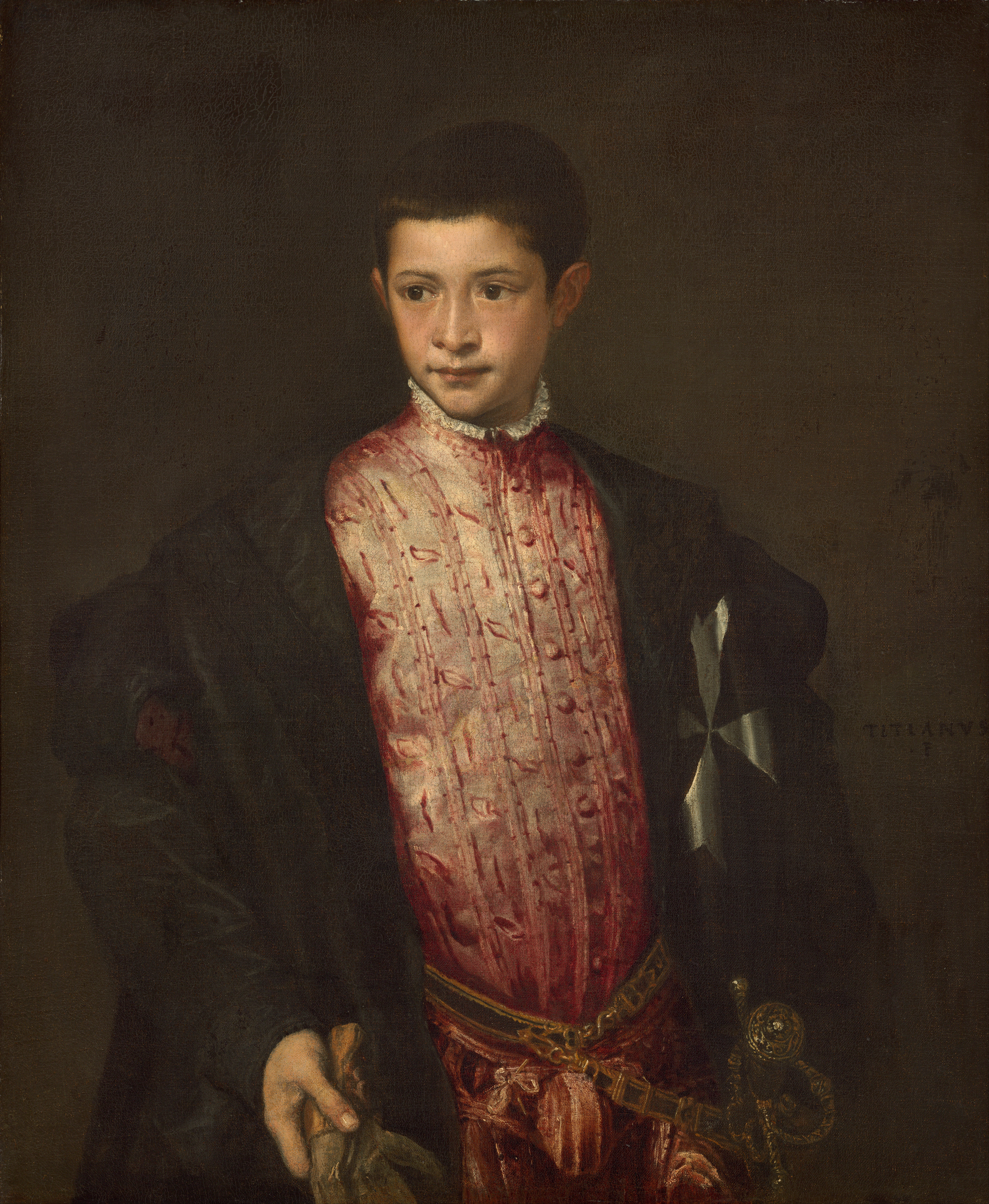
Titian's 1542 portrait of Pier Luigi's son Ranuccio Farnese at 12. The white cross on his left breast identifies him as a knight of the Sovereign Military Order of Malta. It was this work which first brought Titian into contact with Paul III.

Titian disliked travelling and refused the offers. When Paul travelled to northern Italy for negotiations with Charles in 1543 he met Titian for the first time and sat for Portrait of Paul III without a Cap. Around this time, Titian's son Pomponio decided to enter the clergy, and the painter sought to use his contacts with the papacy to gain a church and lands for him. Working through his contacts with Cardinal Alessandro, he asked that in return for the Farnese portraits Pomponio be granted the abbey of San Pietro in Colle Umberto, in grounds bordering Titian's own in Ceneda. Charles respected Titian and so the painter had influence in negotiating with the Farnese. When he received their offers of a commission and invitation to Rome, he made it clear he would only undertake the patronage in return for the grant of the benefice. This was at first rejected, but on 20 September 1544 Titian seemed assured enough to send a message to Cardinal Alessandro that he would visit to "paint Your Honor's illustrious household down to the last cat". Even so, Titian made no move until October of the following year. When he did finally arrive in Rome, he was treated as the most important guest to the city and given an apartment at the Belvedere. In the end the portrait was not completed. Probably once the benefice was granted, he no longer felt there was any reason to remain in Rome and abandoned the composition.

== Description ==
The portrait depicts the tensions and manoeuvrings of 16th century court politics. The deep red background and heavy brushstrokes establish an anxious and tense atmosphere, and the uneasy relationship between the Pope and his suitors. The pope is old, ill and tired and, to some critics' eyes, glares at Ottavio in an accusatory manner. His hat or camauro cloaks his baldness, but there are tell-tale signs of age in his long nose, dark beady eyes, stooped shoulders and long uneven beard. He is noticeably older than in the second Naples portrait of c. 1545. This fact is reinforced by the clock placed on the table beside him, which serves both as a memento mori and a reminder that time is running out. Given this, the presence of his grandsons indicates that the commission was prompted by thoughts of succession.

Nevertheless, Paul retains elements of a powerful and alert patriarch. The painting is set at a curious angle, so that although Paul is positioned low in the pictorial space, the viewer still looks upwards towards him as if in respect. He is dressed in full pomp, wearing wide fur-lined sleeves (a typical Venetian device to convey status), and his cape is laid across his upper body to suggest physical presence.

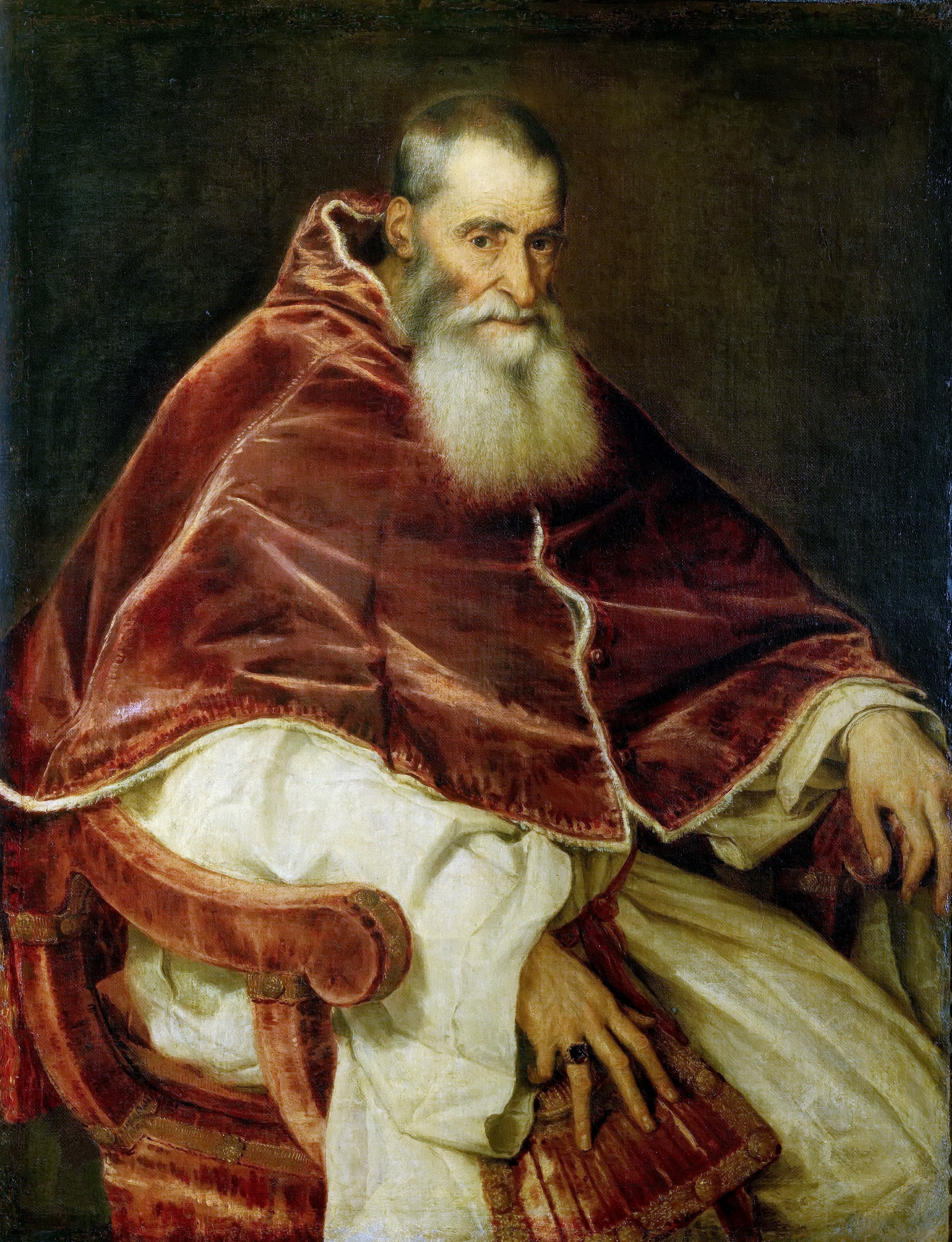
Portrait of Pope Paul III, c.1543. Museo di Capodimonte, Naples. After his appointment as pope, Paul sought out Titian to be his sole portraitist.

The work is often compared to Raphael's Portrait of Pope Leo X with Cardinals of 1518–19 and the 1511–12 portrait of Julius II for its colouring and psychological dynamic. Titian follows the older master in some respects, emphasising the pope's age and showing him in a naturalistic, rather than reverential, setting, but Titian goes further: while Raphael's portraits show a high-minded and introspective pope, Titian presents his subject glaring outwards, caught in a moment of fearful but ruthless calculation. His piercing glare has been described by art historian Jill Dunkerton as having captured his "small bright eyes, but ... missed his genius".

The canvas is dramatically divided in two by a diagonal line separated by colour and tone. The lower two-thirds are dominated by heavy red and white pigments; browns and whites are prominent in the upper right-hand section. This division is delineated by a diagonal reaching from the upper edge of the curtain down to Ottavio's leggings in the right mid-ground. Other echoes of the colours and patterns include the red of Paul's robes against the velvet of his chair and the overhanging curtain. This dramatic colour and luminosity can be in part attributed to this design, and to the manner in which Titian reverses the usual painterly technique in building tone: he began with a dark background, then layered the lighter hues before the darker passages. The effect has been described as a "tour de force of symphonic colourism", and a high point of his blending of red and ochre pigments. Titian uses a variety of brushstrokes. While the pope's robes are painted with very broad strokes, his cape (mozzetta), ageing face and visible hand were captured in minute detail with thin brushes, with his hairs rendered at the level of individual strands.

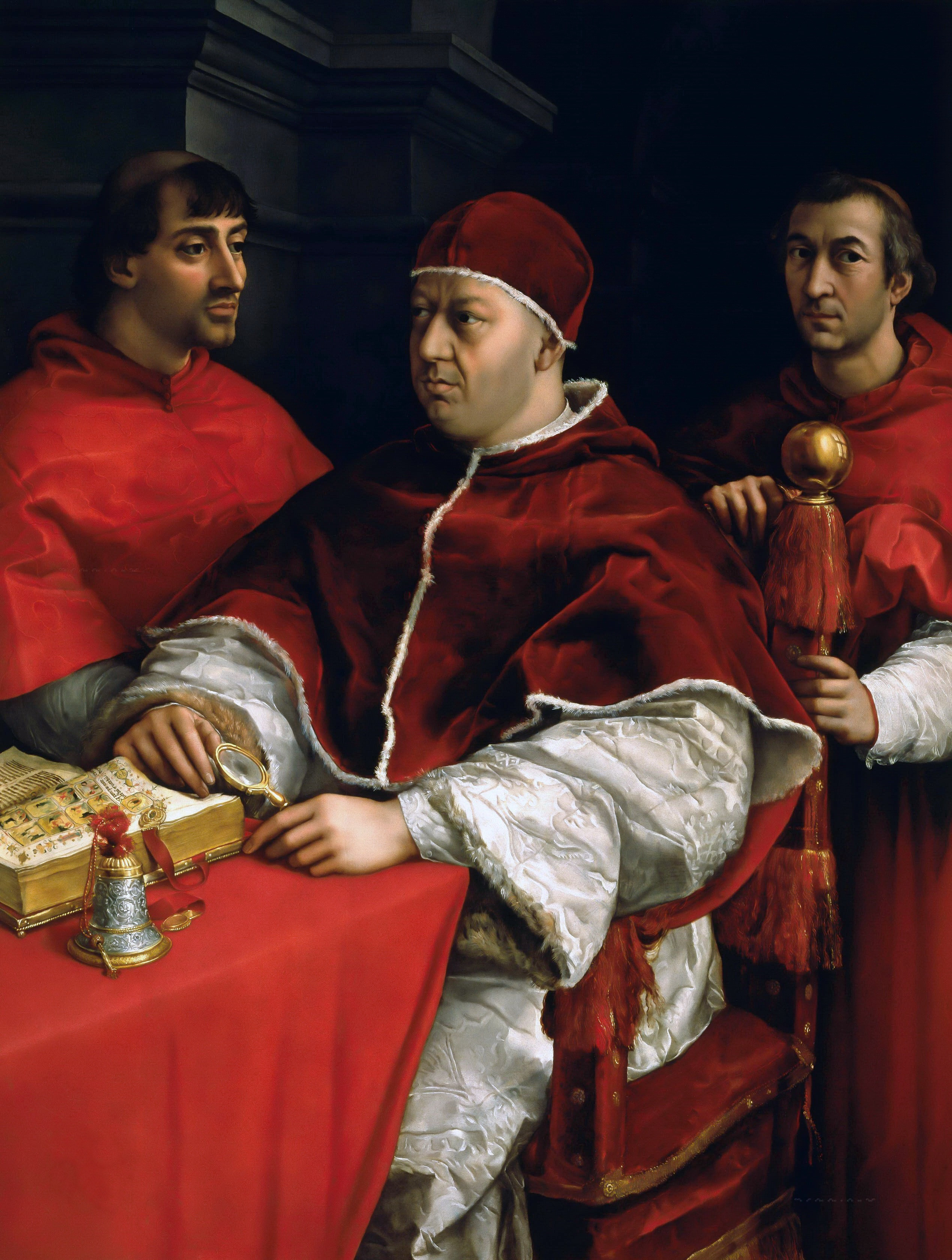
Raphael's Portrait of Pope Leo X with Cardinals, 1518–1519, was the template for the psychological drama depicted in Titian's triple portrait. Both works are centred on a strong patriarch fending against sullen relatives. Uffizi, Florence

Ottavio, shown as tall and muscular, is about to kneel to kiss the Pope's feet, a contemporary manner of greeting a pope: a guest would make three short bows followed by the kissing of the papal feet. Titian indicates this step in the ceremony by showing Paul's shoe decorated with a cross, poking from underneath his gown. Ottavio's head is bowed, but his stern facial expression conveys that he is acting as protocol dictates, rather than with genuine diffidence. Nicholas Penny notes that "at a Renaissance court bowing and scraping were usual. This affects modern attitudes to [the portrait], making the cordial respect of youth seem like the obsequiousness of a crafty courtier."

The grandsons are depicted in very different styles: Alessandro acts in a formal manner and wears clothes of similar colour and tones to Paul. Ottavio, by contrast, wears the browns of the upper right-hand passage, an area of the painting that cuts him physically from the pope. His pose is awkward and difficult to interpret, but he is rendered in a more naturalistic manner than his brother. Alessandro has a distracted, brooding expression. He holds the knob of Paul's backrest, in an echo of Raphael's portrait where Clement VII holds the chair of Leo X as an indicator of his ambitions of succession. Thus Alessandro seems better placed politically, standing to Paul's right in a pose that recalls traditional depictions of Paul the Apostle, and his hand is raised as if in blessing. In the end, Paul was unable to influence his succession after Charles V weakened the Medici hold on the office.

The work is unfinished; a number of details, most noticeably the pope's right hand, are missing. Other passages are bland and uniform, with some key areas still blocked by the underdrawing. Many of Titian's characteristic finishing touches are missing; Paul's fur-lined sleeves do not contain the polishing white strokes of the 1543 portrait, or his usual final overglaze or glossing.

== Interpretation ==
Although the work is often thought of as an unflattering and cold look at an ageing pope besieged by cunning and opportunistic relatives, the reality is more complex and the artist's intention more subtle. It is certainly a very unguarded portrait of one of the most powerful men of his day, and in stark contrast to Titian's two earlier portraits of Paul, both of which were deferential. It is widely accepted as one of the most politically difficult portrait commissions in art history, requiring an understanding of the interplay of relationships with a depth "worthy of Shakespeare", in the opinion of art historians Rodolfo Pallucchini and Harold Wethey. However, it was one Titian seems to have resolved; while the complexity of the relationships is all on the canvas, it may have been intended as an indicator to Charles that Paul retained his position as the dominant patriarch – old and frail but still a man of vitality, and in control of his squabbling descendants.

Moreover, working under commission from the Farnese family, Titian would not have sought to portray the sitters in an obviously unsympathetic manner. While Paul is shown as old and frail, he is given a broad chest and cunning eyes that indicate his intelligence and guile. Ottavio is presented as cold and impervious, but this was probably a device to show his strength of character and conviction. Alessandro is favoured by his positioning closest to the Pope, yet x-ray analysis reveals he had originally stood to the left of the pope and was moved, probably on request by Alessandro himself, to a position where his hand was resting on the papal throne, indicating his claim on the papacy.

== Provenance ==
Titian abandoned the painting before completion and for the next hundred years it was kept unframed and unhung in a Farnese cellar. Alessandro's large collection of art and antiques, which included the Titian portraits commissioned by Paul, was eventually inherited by Elisabetta Farnese (1692–1766). Elisabetta, who married Philip V of Spain in 1714, passed on the collection to her son Carlos, who became Duke of Parma and later King of Spain. In 1734, he conquered the kingdoms of Sicily and Naples, and the collection was transferred to Naples. In 1738 Carlos built the Palace of Capodimonte, which includes the Museo di Capodimonte, in part to house the Farnese art collection. The painting remains there today, hanging in the Farnese Gallery section. The Museo di Capodimonte was designated a national museum in 1950.

== See also ==
- List of works by Titian
