= Sebastiano Deli di Castel Durante =

16th-century Roman Catholic bishop

Most Reverend Sebastiano Deli di Castel Durante
- Bishop of Bitonto
- Church: Catholic Church
- Diocese: Diocese of Bitonto
- In office: 1538–1544
- Predecessor: Alessandro Farnese (iuniore)
- Successor: Alessandro Farnese (iuniore)

Sebastiano Deli di Castel Durante was a Roman Catholic prelate who served as Bishop of Bitonto (1538–1544).

== Biography ==
On 11 Jan 1538, Sebastiano Deli di Castel Durante was appointed during the papacy of Pope Paul III as Bishop of Bitonto. He served as Bishop of Bitonto until his resignation in 1537.

== External links and additional sources ==
- Cheney, David M. "Diocese of Bitonto". Catholic-Hierarchy.org. (for Chronology of Bishops) ^{[self-published]}
- Chow, Gabriel. "Diocese of Bitonto (Italy)". GCatholic.org. (for Chronology of Bishops) ^{[self-published]}

Catholic Church titles
| Preceded by Alessandro Farnese (iuniore) | Bishop of Bitonto; 1538–1544 | Succeeded by Alessandro Farnese (iuniore) |
