= Lópe de Alarcón =

16th-century Roman Catholic bishop

Most Reverend Giacomo Orsini
- Bishop of Bitonto
- Church: Catholic Church
- Diocese: Diocese of Bitonto
- In office: 1532–1537
- Predecessor: Alessandro Farnese (seniore)
- Successor: Alessandro Farnese (iuniore)

Personal details
- Born: Spain

Lópe de Alarcón was a Roman Catholic prelate who served as Bishop of Bitonto (1532–1537).

== Biography ==
Lópe de Alarcón was born in Spain. On 17 May 1532, he was appointed during the papacy of Pope Clement VII as Bishop of Bitonto, He served as Bishop of Bitonto until his resignation in 1537.

== External links and additional sources ==
- Cheney, David M. "Diocese of Bitonto". Catholic-Hierarchy.org. (for Chronology of Bishops) ^{[self-published]}
- Chow, Gabriel. "Diocese of Bitonto (Italy)". GCatholic.org. (for Chronology of Bishops) ^{[self-published]}

Catholic Church titles
Preceded by Alessandro Farnese (seniore)	Bishop of Bitonto; 1532–1537	Succeeded by Alessandro Farnese (iuniore)
