= Portrait of Cardinal Alessandro Farnese (Titian) =

Painting by Titian

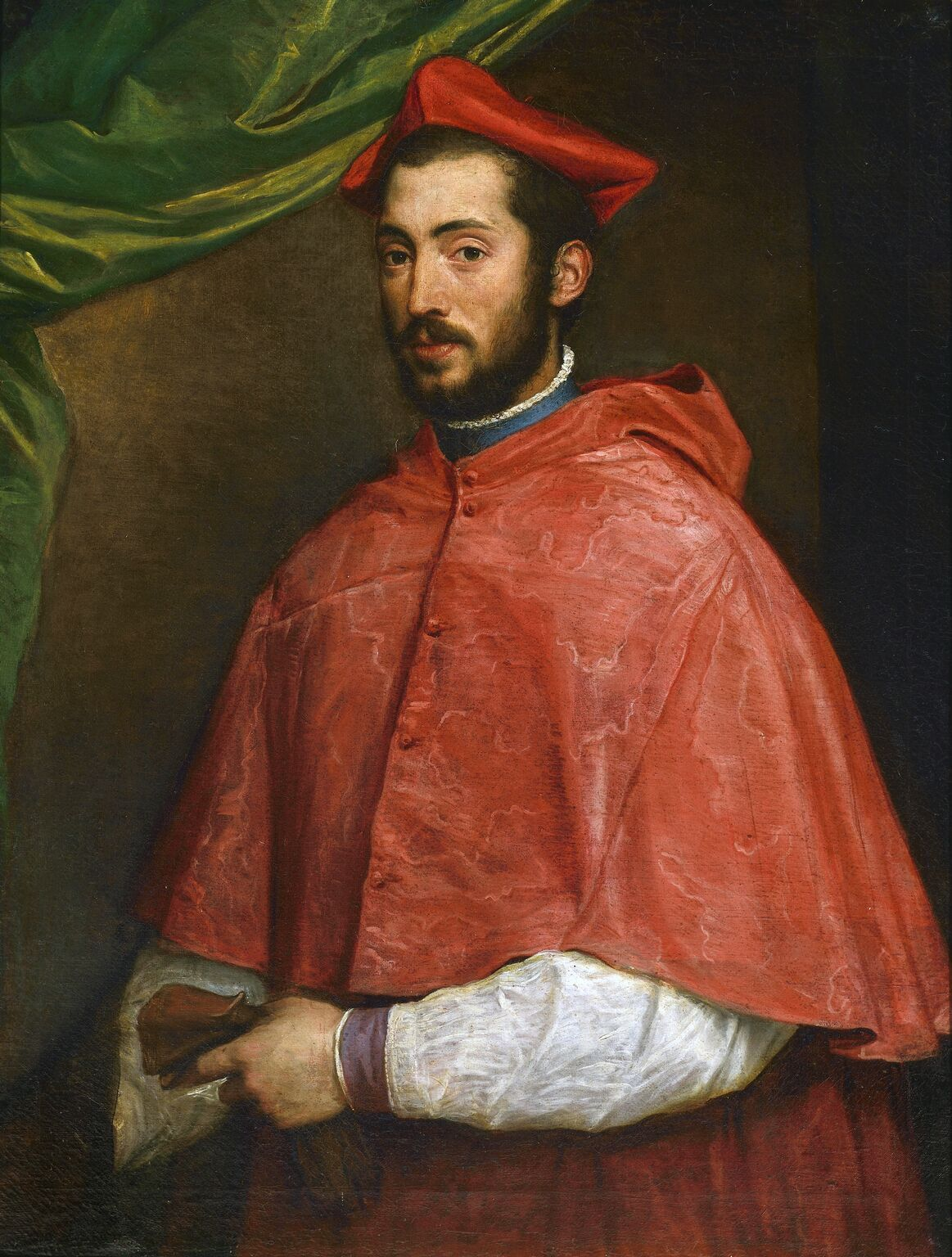
- Artist: Titian
- Year: c. 1545 – 46
- Medium: oil on canvas
- Dimensions: 97 cm × 73 cm (38 in × 29 in)
- Location: Museo di Capodimonte, Naples

Portrait of Cardinal Alessandro Farnese is a c. 1545–46 oil on canvas three-quarter-length portrait of Alessandro Farnese the Younger (1520–1589) by Titian. It is held in the Museo di Capodimonte, in Naples.

Its subject is shown in front of a green curtain, wearing a cardinal's robes and holding gloves in his right hand (an accessory more usual in portraits of gentlemen and noblemen than of clerics). His depiction here is similar to that in Pope Paul III and His Grandsons, placing the two works close together in date.

== Provenance ==
No surviving sources mention how, when or by whom the work was commissioned. Its subject was a major patron of the arts and the main intermediary between Titian and the Farnese family, first commissioning Portrait of Ranuccio Farnese from him, showing Alessandro's younger brother, then Portrait of Pope Paul III and finally a Danaë for his own private rooms. Titian was then summoned to the papal court in Rome, where he probably received and fulfilled the commission for a portrait of Alessandro, who had in 1534 been made cardinal of Sant'Angelo in Foro Piscium, aged only fourteen, by Pope Paul III. On the work's reverse is a grey wax seal showing the Farnese family lily, the original inventory number "66" and the inscription "C.S.ANGLO", referring to the titulus the subject was granted on being made a cardinal.

The 1641 and 1644 inventories of the Palazzo Farnese in Rome mentions the work, which from 1663 went with all the other Titians in the Farnese collection to the Duchy of Parma and Piacenza. Whilst in Emilio it was mentioned in a catalogue as a 'three-quarter length portrait on canvas of the cardinal of Sant'Angelo', attributed to Titian and given the catalogue number 66. Like all the other Titians in the Farnese collection, it was then mentioned in the inventories of the Palazzo del Giardino in Parma in 1680 before being selected as one of the works "worthy" of being moved to the new galleries at the palazzo della Pilotta, also in Parma. A copy by an artist in Titian's circle was recorded at the Palazzo Farnese in Rome (inv. n. 33) before following a similar trajectory to the original work, being recorded at the Palazzo del Giardino in Parma (inv. n. 228), then at the Palazzo della Pilotta in Parma (inv. n. 290), then in Naples and finally in the Reggia di Caserta, where it now hangs.

In 1734 the original work and the rest of the Farnese Collection were inherited by the family's last heir Elisabetta Farnese, who then passed it to her son Charles – it was thus moved with much of the collection in Emilio to Naples. It was looted by French troops in 1799 during their establishment of the Parthenopean Republic. Ferdinand IV sent Domenico Venuti to search for works of art taken from Naples as well as new additions to his collections. Venuti found the portrait in Rome in 1800 awaiting shipment to France and reclaimed it, though on its return to Naples it was hung not at Capodimonte but the palazzo di Francavilla. This meant that it stayed in Naples for the ten years of French rule from 1805 onwards, unlike the other Titians from his collection which Ferdinand took with him on fleeing to Palermo.

It was then recorded as hanging in Naples' Palazzo Reale until 1831, when it returned to the new Real Museo Borbonico in the Palazzo degli Studi (which now houses the National Archaeological Museum, Naples), where it was referred to as a "portrait of Cardinal Santangelo holding gloves, by Tiziano Vecellio". At the end of the 19th century some critics doubted it was an autograph work by Titian due to the poor state of preservation into which it had fallen, but conservation work in the 1990s has restored the original pigments, including the green curtain and the glow on the left of the work, showing them to be completely in harmony with works definitely produced during Titian's brief stay in Rome.

== See also ==
- List of works by Titian

== Bibliography (in Italian) ==
- Guida al Museo Nazionale di Capodimonte, Editrice Electa (2006)
- AA. VV., I Farnese. Arte e collezionismo, Milano, Editrice Electa, 1995, ISBN 978-8843551323.
- AA. VV., Tiziano e il ritratto di corte da Raffaello ai Carracci, Napoli, Editrice Electa, 2006, ISBN 978-8851003364.
