= Alessandro Farnese (cardinal) =

Italian cardinal and diplomat (1520–1589)

His Eminence Alessandro Farnese
- Archpriest of Saint Peter's Basilica
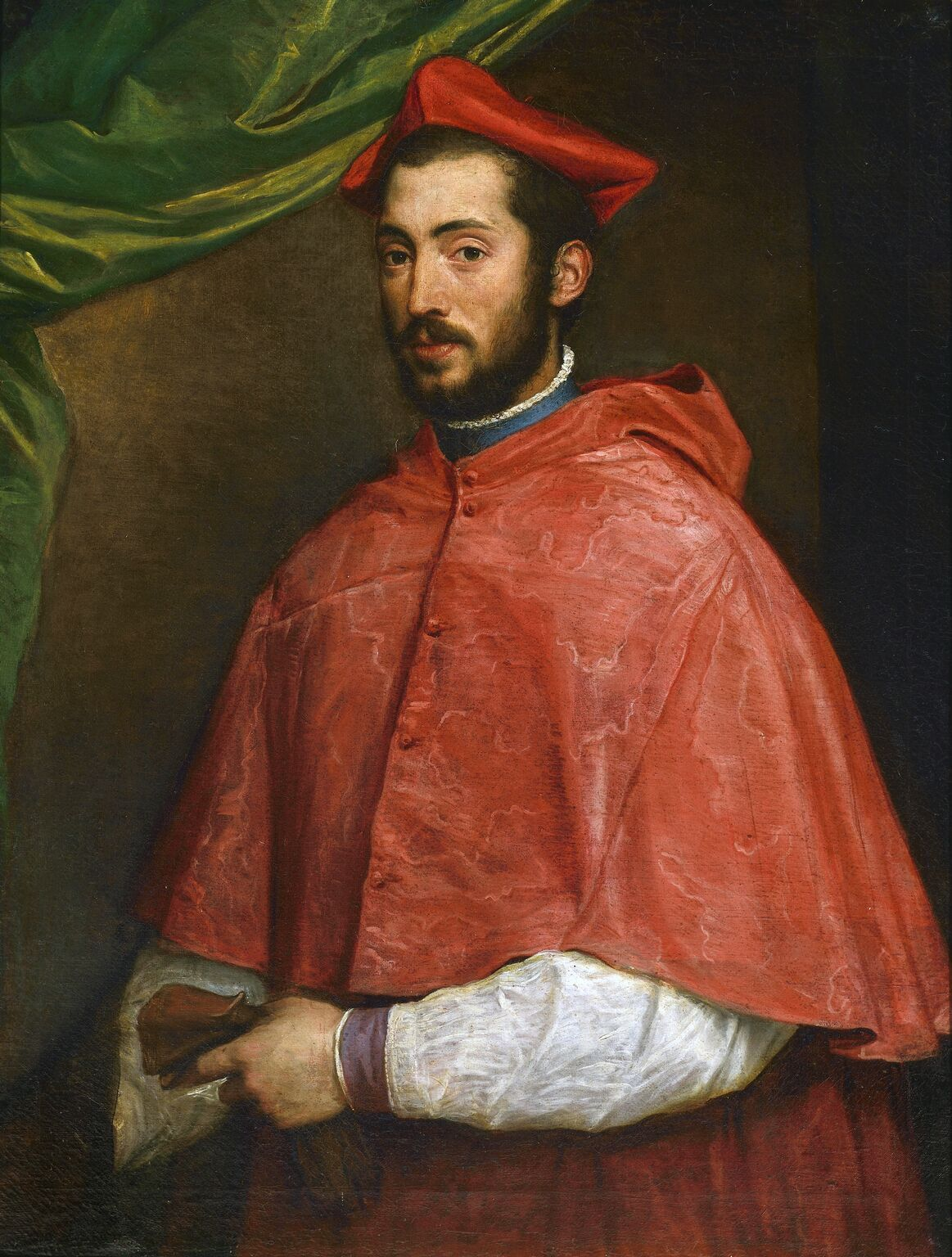
- Portrait by Titian, c. 1545-1546
- Church: Roman Catholic
- In office: 1543–1589
- Predecessor: Francesco Cornaro
- Successor: Giovanni Evangelista Palotta
- Other posts: Dean of the College of Cardinals (1580–1589); Cardinal-Bishop of Ostia (1580–1589); Cardinal-Priest of San Lorenzo in Damaso (1564–1589)
- Previous posts: Cardinal-Bishop of Porto e Santa Rufina (1578–1580); Archbishop of Monreale (1568–1573); Cardinal-Bishop of Frascati (1565–1578); Cardinal-Bishop of Sabina (1564–1565); Patriarch of Jerusalem (1539– c. 1550)

Orders
- Ordination: 18 December 1534 by Pope Paul III
- Consecration: 2 July 1519 by Pope Leo X
- Created cardinal: 18 December 1534 by Pope Paul III
- Rank: Cardinal-Bishop

Personal details
- Born: Alessandro Farnese; 7 October 1520 Castello Valentano, Valentano
- Died: 2 March 1589 (aged 68) Rome, Papal States
- Buried: Il Gesù, Rome
- Residence: Avignon, Rome
- Parents: Pierluigi Farnese; Girolama Orsini
- Children: Clelia Farnese
- Occupation: Papal nephew; diplomat; administrator
- Education: Bologna (law)

Alessandro Farnese (5 October 1520 – 2 March 1589) was an Italian cardinal, diplomat, and a great collector and patron of the arts. Farnese was the grandson of Pope Paul III (who also bore the name Alessandro Farnese), and the son of Pier Luigi Farnese, Duke of Parma, who was murdered in 1547. He should not be confused with his nephew, Alessandro Farnese, Governor of the Spanish Netherlands, and the great-grandson of Pope Paul III.

== Early life ==
Farnese was born at the family castle at Valentano in Tuscany on 7 October 1520 (current province of Viterbo), the son of Pierluigi Farnese, who was the son of Cardinal Alessandro Farnese (Pope Paul III); and Girolama Orsini, daughter of Ludovico Orsini, seventh Conte di Pitigliano, and Giulia Conti. Pierluigi Farnese and Girolama Orsini were married in Rome on 6 August 1519. Young Alessandro studied at Bologna along with his cousin, Guido Ascanio Sforza di Santa Fiora. He was a member of the Collegio Ancarano, which had been founded in the 15th century by Petrus de Ancarano in Tuscia, for students specializing in legal studies.

On 18 December 1534, at the age of 14, he was appointed Cardinal Deacon of Sant'Angelo in Pescheria by his grandfather Paul III, who had been elected to the papacy two months previously. On 11 August 1535, he was appointed Abbot Commendatory of the Abbey of Tre Fontane on the Via Ostiense, a position he held until 1544. In 1535, he was also appointed Abbot commendatory of S. Étienne de Caën.

== Offices ==
Young Cardinal Farnese received many other offices and benefices, becoming Vice-Chancellor of the Holy Roman Church (13 August 1535 – 2 March 1589), He also became Governor of Tivoli (1535–1550), Archpriest of St. Mary Major Basilica (1537–1543), Archpriest of St. Peter's Basilica (1543–1589). On 27 August 1539, at the age of 18, Alessandro Farnese was named titular Latin Patriarch of Jerusalem; he vacated the office on the appointment of a new Patriarch on 28 February 1550. The office was highly lucrative, the duties were nominal and did not necessarily involve episcopal functions.

In 1538, he was appointed Pope Paul III's principal Secretary and, with the assistance of Monsignor (Msgr.) Marcello Cervino, he managed most of the papal business until 1549.

In 1541, Cardinal Farnese was named Protector of the Holy Roman Empire before the Holy See and Protector of Spain before the Holy See. These offices made him the most prominent expediter of all Imperial and Spanish business in the Roman Curia; his opinion was always consulted and, since he was the Pope's nephew, it was often followed. At the same time, he was appointed Papal Legate in Avignon (1541–1565). Royal consent was required.

From 1564 to 1565, he was Bishop of Sabina and it is conjectured (in the absence of positive evidence) that it was in 1564 that Farnese finally was consecrated a bishop. He was certainly a bishop when he was the principal Consecrator of Cardinal Giulio della Rovere on 15 April 1566. From 1565 to 1578, he was Bishop of Tusculum (Frascati). He was the Bishop of Porto from 9 July 1578 to 5 December 1580. He was then Cardinal-Bishop of Ostia and Velletri and Dean of the College of Cardinals from 5 December 1580 until his death on 2 March 1589.

== Benefices and income ==
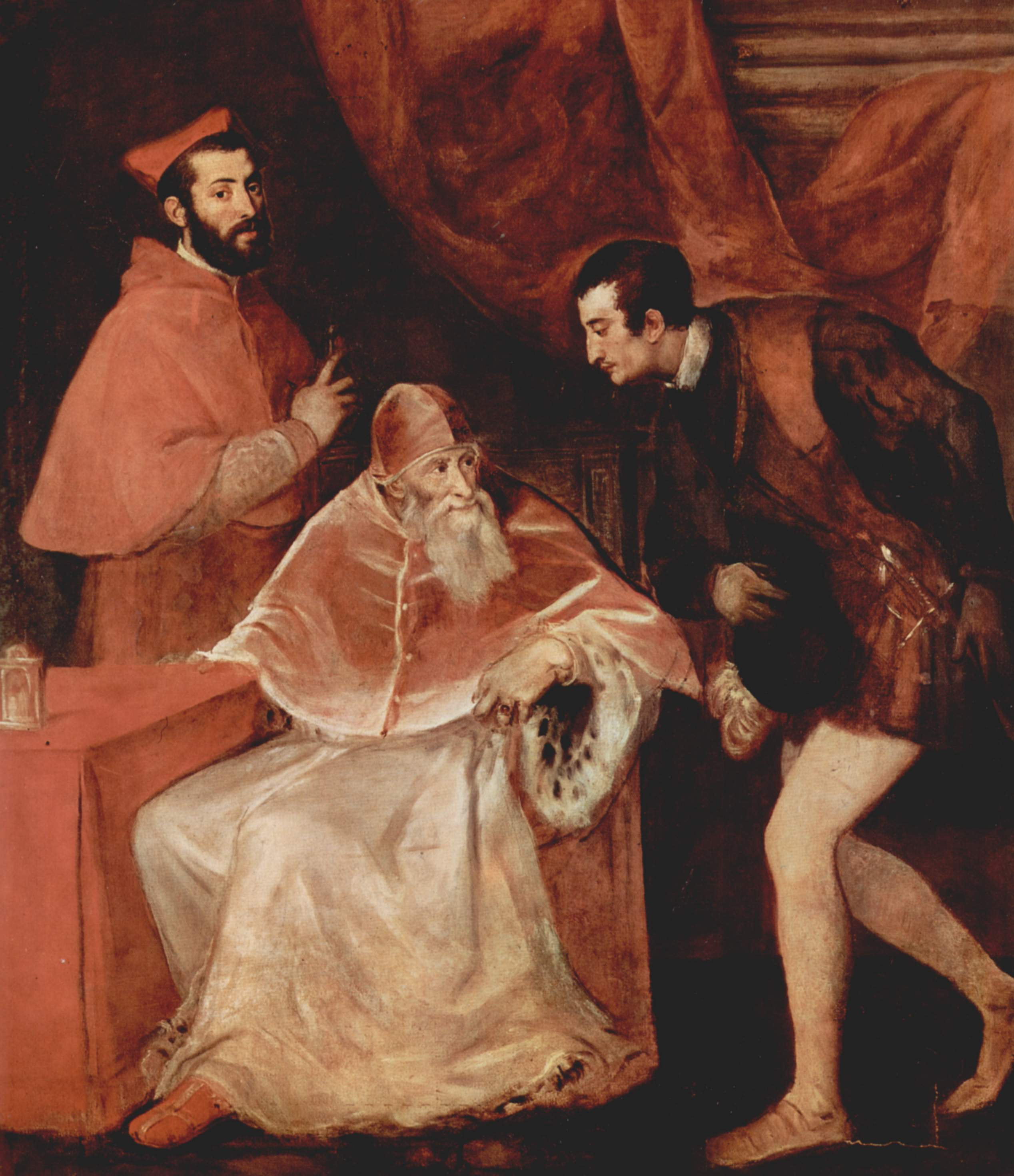
Titian's triple portrait, Pope Paul III and his Grandsons, depicts Alessandro at left.

His grandfather, Pope Paul III, immediately named Alessandro Farnese Administrator of the Diocese of Parma (1 November 1534), allowing him to collect the episcopal income during the interregnum. Alessandro resigned on 13 August 1535, when Cardinal Guido Ascanio Sforza di Santa Fiora, another grandson of Paul III and only two years older than Alessandro, was named the new Administrator (enjoying his Parmesan income until he resigned in 1560).

Farnese was appointed Administrator of Jaen, Spain, from 30 July 1535 until another Administrator, Cardinal Alessandro Cesarini, was appointed on 6 July 1537. He was Administrator of the Archdiocese of Avignon from 1535 to 1551 and of the Diocese of Vizeu, Portugal (1547–1552).

On 9 May 1536, the Emperor Charles V named Cardinal Farnese as the new archbishop of Monreale in Sicily; his appointment was confirmed on 15 May 1536, by Pope Paul III. But Monreale was not a happy place, since the monks of the Cathedral of Monreale and the clergy of the diocese were in one squabble after another with each other. On 26 July 1549, the Pope was forced to intervene, in a letter in which he referred to the Cardinal under the title of perpetuus Administrator. A Vicar was appointed for the underage and absentee Archbishop, Msgr. Giovanni Antonio Fassari, titular Bishop of Christopolis in Greece; he was succeeded in 1546 by Pompeo Zambecari. In 1557, he was followed by Msgr. Giovanni Pietro Fortiguerra, Bishop of Cyrene in Libya., The Cardinal allowed the Jesuits to found a college in Monreale, and allowed the priests of the Society to work in the diocese. In 1568, Cardinal Farnese visited his diocese and held a synod. He was accompanied by his librarian, the famous antiquarian and papal biographer, Onofrio Panvinio, who, unhappily, died at Palermo on 16 (?) March 1568. The Cardinal continued to enjoy the income of the diocese until 1573, when he resigned the bishopric.

On 17 June 1537, Farnese was appointed Administrator of the Diocese of Bitonto in the Kingdom of Naples on the resignation of Bishop Lopez de Alarcon; his administration ceased upon the appointment of a new bishop on 8 January 1538. He became Administrator of Diocese of Massa Marittima on 15 November 1538, on the resignation of Bishop Hieronymus de Glanderonibus; since he was only eighteen, he was not canonically eligible to be the bishop, though he could—and did—collect the income of the bishop until a successor was appointed in April 1547. On 16 July 1540, Farnese was named Administrator of the Diocese of Cavaillon in Provence, which he resigned one year later on 20 July 1541. In 1549, his grandfather Pope Paul III died.

He was Administrator of the Archdiocese of Tours from 28 April 1553, until Pope Julius III ordered the issue of bulls for Archbishop Simon de Mailly on 25 June 1554. In the case of Tours, the right of nomination belonged to the King of France, Henri II, whose daughter Diane had married Farnese's youngest brother Orazio in 1552. On 25 June 1554, the same day that his administration of Tours ceased, Farnese was appointed Administrator of the Diocese of Viviers, which lasted until the Pope approved King Henri's nomination of a new bishop on 12 November 1554. He was likewise nominated by the King of France to be Administrator of the Diocese of Cahors, the appointment being approved by Pope Julius III on 12 November 1554; a new bishop was approved by Pope Paul IV on 7 May 1557, ending his appointment. There had been two Conclaves in the interim, accounting probably for the length of his Administration of Cahors. In 1555, Cardinal Farnese was named Administrator of the Diocese of Spoleto, a post he held until a new bishop was appointed on 16 December 1562. Cardinal Alessandro Farnese also served as Administrator of the Archdiocese of Benevento from 22 November 1556, until a new archbishop was approved by Paul IV on 14 January 1558. All of these appointments should be considered as opportunities for financial enrichment, not opportunities for service in vineyards of the Lord far from Rome. The various administrations were carried out by authorized agents.

In 1564, Alessandro Farnese succeeded his brother Ranuccio as Abbot Commendatory of the Monastery of Farfa, which he held until his death in 1589. It was he who introduced the Benedictine monks of the Congregation of Monte Cassino into the monastery in 1567. He also built, or rebuilt, the monastery's water supply.

== Diplomatic activity ==
Farnese also became a Papal Legate, arranging peace between the perpetually warring Charles V, Holy Roman Emperor and Francis I of France. In the Consistory of 24 November 1539 he was sent as Apostolic Legatus a latere to attempt to arrange a peace between the two feuding monarchs. He left Rome on 29 November and entered Paris on 31 December. He was in Rouen on 14 January 1540, met with the King on 14 February. He then left for Flanders on 17 February for a meeting with the Emperor; he stayed for three months, and returned to Paris on 14 May. He had a meeting with King Francis on the 17th at Saint-Germain-en-Laye. He returned to Rome on 5 June 1540.

Cardinal Farnese was named Legatus a latere again, and for the same purpose, at the Consistory of 21 November 1543. He arrived at Fontainebleau on 29 December 1543 and remained until 6 January 1544, when he departed for Bruxelles to visit the Emperor. He arrived on 14 January, and was back in France by 4 February. He returned to Rome on 1 March 1544.

In 1546, he accompanied the troops sent by the pope to the aid of Charles V against the Schmalkaldic League.

In 1548, Cardinal Alessandro Farnese took into his service as his private secretary Annibale Caro, the noted poet and prose stylist. Caro had previously been in the service of Cardinal Alessandro's father, Pierluigi Farnese, and after his murder on 10 September 1547, to Duke Ottavio Farnese, and then to Cardinal Ranuccio Farnese, his own younger brother.

In 1551, Cardinal Alessandro was sent by Pope Julius III to convince his brother Ottavio, the Duke of Parma and Piacenza, to surrender those territories, which, the Pope said were fiefs of the Church. The Farnese had spent more than fifteen years developing their dukedom, and Cardinal Alessandro's father had been assassinated in the struggle with the Gonzaga and the Emperor Charles over it. The Farnese were being protected by the French Crown, which considered Parma its entrée into northern Italy, where it challenged the Emperor to the possession of the Duchy of Milan and the Lombard plain. Julius was toying with explosive material. Ottavio refused, and Alessandro supported him. The Farnese had a complete breach in relations with the Pope, and Alessandro was immediately unwelcome in Rome. Pope Julius sequestrated his diocese of Monreale, and confiscated all of the moveables in the Palazzo Farnese, said to have been worth 30,000 scudi. Duke Ottavio's duchy was sequestered. He withdrew in April, first to a visit with his sister Vittoria, the Duchess of Urbino, then to Florence, and finally to Avignon.

After peace was made between the Pope and France, Orazio Farnese had the Duchy of Castro restored to him (1552) and, to protect the Farnese's French connection, Orazio married Diane de France, the illegitimate daughter of Henri II. Unfortunately, Cardinal Farnese's brother Orazio was killed in battle on 18 July 1553, leaving no heirs. The dukedoms went to their younger brother Ottavio Farnese.

Farnese had been in France, when on 6 June 1554 he was appointed by Henri II to go to Rome and take charge of French affairs in the absence of Cardinal d'Este, who was in Parma—over the objections of Cardinal du Bellay, who did not appreciate being supplanted. Cardinal d'Este was ruling Parma on behalf of the French king, who had acquired the duchy from Paul III as the price of an alliance. In November, Henri named a new Ambassador to the Holy See, and Cardinal Farnese was free to return to France. He took up residence in Avignon.

== Conclaves of 1555 ==
Cardinal Farnese did not participate in the first conclave of 1555, 5 – 9 April, which followed the death of Julius III. He had been in Avignon, serving as Legate and avoiding the unwelcome attention of the Pope. But, on the news of the death of Pope Julius, he took the road for Rome. He was carrying letters from Henri II of France to the College of Cardinals and to individual cardinals, in favor of Cardinal Reginald Pole. He did not arrive, however, until after the middle of the month of April. Cardinal Louis de Guise-Lorraine, also travelling from France, arrived on the 21st. In fact, only two French cardinals were in Rome, thereby giving the Imperial faction a great advantage. This was a matter of annoyance for the French, for King Henri had extracted from Pope Julius III, through negotiations carried on by Cardinals Georges d' Armagnac, Alessandro Farnese, and Jean du Bellay, a bull which allowed an extra 15 days before a Conclave began, in order to allow cardinals who had to travel a long distance (the French) to reach Rome. The bull was completely ignored by the Cardinals already in Rome, and only the Novendiales were observed.

In accordance with older instructions direct from Henri II, the French faction was supporting Cardinal d'Este, then the Cardinal de Tournon (who was not present at the Conclave), and then Cardinal du Bellay. The Emperor, as in the Conclave of 1550, had a preference for Cardinal Reginald Pole, the Papal Legate in England. Pole, however, was strongly opposed by the French (in ignorance of the letters which Farnese was carrying), and by Cardinal Gian Pietro Carafa, the Dean of the Sacred College of Cardinals and principal Inquisitor of the Roman Inquisition, who regarded Pole (and a number of other cardinals) as Protestant heretics. D'Este was not electable (Sir John Masone, the English agent wrote: "Marry, we hear of no quality to set him forward but that he is rich."), though the six votes he received in the first ballot caused considerable consternation, and the beginning of a "Stop D'Este" movement. Some of the cleverer cardinals, led by Carafa and Madruzzi of Trent, realized that, when all the opinions were factored in, there were very few electable cardinals, the best of whom was Cardinal Marcello Cervini. He was a reformer, he was strict, and he was uncorrupted; he was opposed to nepotism. Unfortunately, Cervini was disliked by the Emperor. But the genuine reformers, who wanted the resumption of the Council of Trent, worked with Carafa and Madruzzi to produce a two-thirds majority. Among them were Ranuccio Farnese, Farnese's brother, and Guido Ascanio Sforza, his first-cousin. When Farnese finally arrived from Avignon in mid-April, he was no doubt delighted to find his grandfather's secretary, Cardinal Marcello Cervini, on the throne of Peter. Unfortunately, on the morning of the 18th, Pope Marcellus II showed symptoms of a fever and in the night between 30 April and 1 May, he died. But even before Marcellus was dead, Cardinal Farnese wrote directly to Henri II, urging him to send the French cardinals to Rome immediately. A second Conclave was necessary.

The second Conclave of 1555 opened on 15 May, with the same cardinals as in April, but with the addition of eight late arrivals. The leading candidate seemed to be Cardinal Carafa, the Inquisitor, but he was told to his face by the Imperial Ambassador that the Emperor Charles V did not want him as Pope. The Imperial faction was favoring Cardinals Carpi, Morone, and Pole. Pole also seemed to have French support, but there was an influential group, led by Carafa, Carpi, and Alvarez (all professional Inquisitors), who openly questioned the orthodoxy of Pole and of Morone. The French Ambassador, Jean d' Avanson, informed King Henri that his favorite candidate, Cardinal d'Este, was being opposed vigorously by the Imperial faction, and that he could not win, thanks to a "virtual veto" (that is, the withholding of votes for a candidate by more than one-third of the voters); the Emperor even expressed fears that d'Este might try to bribe himself into the papacy. D'Avanson also had to break the news that Cardinal du Bellay, out of personal ambition, had broken ranks and would support Cardinal Carafa. In the voting, the Imperial candidate, Cardinal Carpi, seemed to be moving forward, until the French faction and the cardinals created by Julius III (of which there were fifteen at the Conclave) combined to put him out of the running. Once it was clear that nobody in the French faction was going to succeed, Cardinal Farnese and Cardinal d'Este decided to throw their support to Cardinal Carafa. The Imperial faction was so frightened at what Pope Carafa might do in trying to get Naples out of the hands of the Emperor that they sent Cardinals Corner and Ricci to Alessandro Farnese to beg him to abandon Carafa and accept their votes for himself. But Farnese was not so foolish as to believe that he could be successful without the endorsement either of the Emperor or of the King of France—and he had neither. He did not respond to the offer. The supporters of Carafa finally numbered more than the two-thirds needed for election, but the Imperialists (who were caucusing in the Hall of the Secret Consistory) refused to come to the chapel and carry out the electoral process. It was Farnese who, using both blandishments and threats, managed to get the Imperialists to give in and assemble with the rest of the cardinals in the Cappella Paolina. On the afternoon of 23 May, the Feast of the Ascension, the seventy-eight year old Cardinal Gian Pietro Carafa of Naples was elected pope by acclamation. He chose the name Paul IV.

He had been the co-founder of the Theatine Order, and was a promoter of reform in the Church. He was no humanist, however, and preferred the doctrine of Thomas Aquinas. He was also a vigorous opponent of Protestantism, and anything that favored it. He saw heretics everywhere, even inside the College of Cardinals, and as an Inquisitor he showed no scruple or mercy for those who were tainted. Showing all of the traditional prejudices against the Jews, and especially against converted Jews, he issued a bull on 14 July 1555, Cum nimis absurdum, creating the Jewish Ghetto of Rome. He refused to recognize the election of Ferdinand I as Holy Roman Emperor, and he refused to recognize the retirement of Charles V. He ruled until his death on 18 August 1559, or rather his nephew, Cardinal Carlo Carafa, did. It was only three months before his death that Paul IV was fully informed of the misdeeds of his nephews, Cardinal Carafa, Giovanni Caraffa Duke of Paliano, and Antonio Carafa Marchese of Montebello. When the Florentine Ambassador, Bongiano Gianfiliazzi, had attempted to have an audience with Paul IV to enlighten him about his corrupt nephews, the door was slammed in his face by Cardinal Carafa. Obviously, there was no room in the Curia for the advice of Cardinal Farnese. There was considerable danger to Farnese properties because of Paul IV's anti-imperial policy.

It was in 1556 that Cardinal Farnese commissioned Giacomo Barozzi da Vignola to take in hand the half-completed fortress at Caprarola and turn it into a country villa. Actual construction began in 1559 and was completed in 1573. Even when half completed, in 1561, Cardinal Alessandro commissioned Taddeo Zuccari and his workshop to decorate the rooms on the lower floor. The Stanza della solitudine was decorated by the same artists between 1563 and 1565, in accordance with a design created by Onufrio Panvinio.

Cardinal Farnese retired to Parma in the meantime (1557), where he stayed with his brother, Duke Ottavio. It was there and at that time that they were approached with peace feelers by Cardinal Carafa, who was even willing to marry one of the Carafas to young Duke Alessandro, the son of Ottavio and Margaret of Parma. That alliance did not take place. Nonetheless, Cardinal Alessandro's influence in Rome was considerable. He was named Cardinal Protector of the Empire (14 September 1541), Sicily, of Aragon (13 December 1565), of Portugal, of Poland, of the Republic of Genoa, and of Ragusa.

== The Morone Affair ==
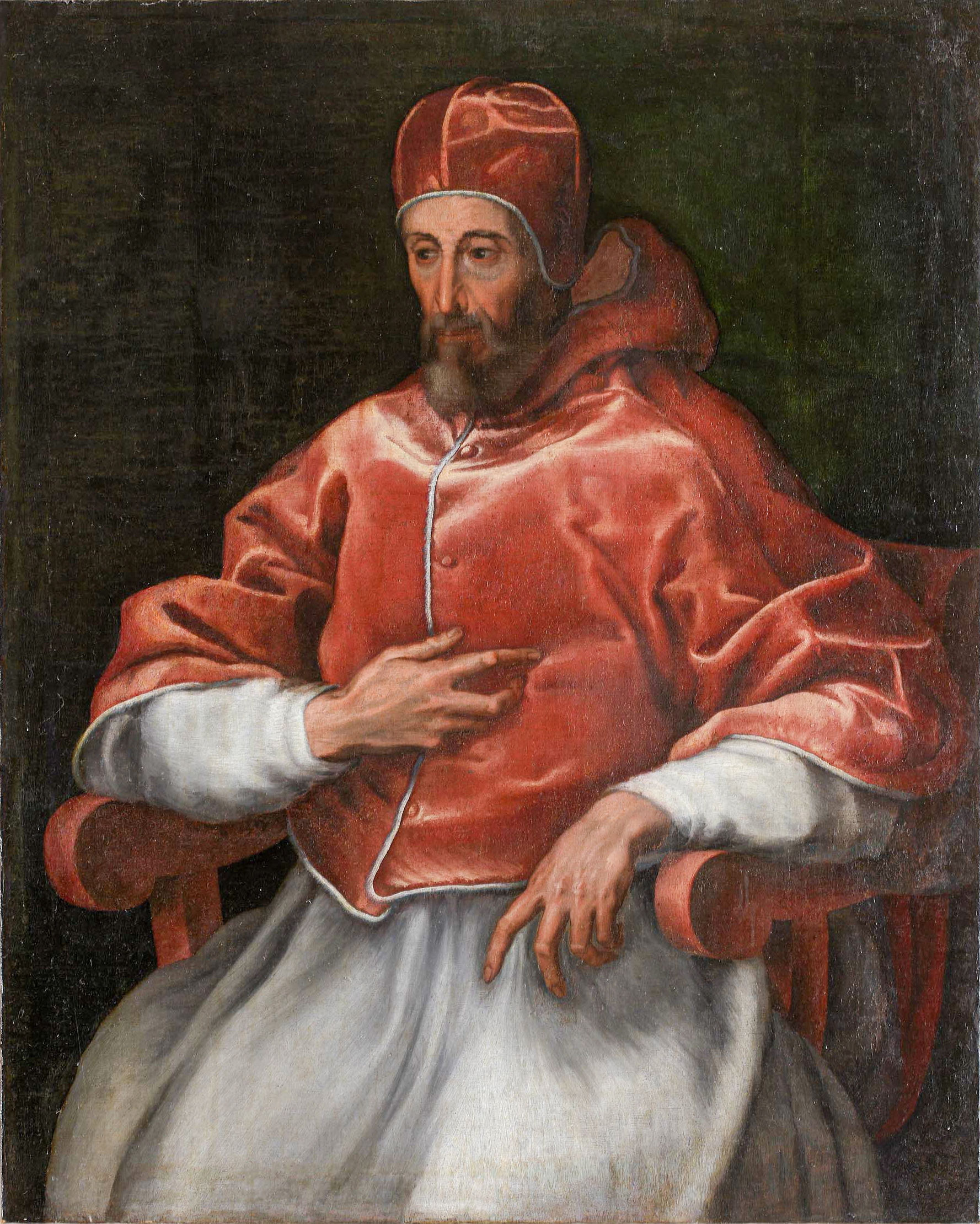
Pope Paul IV, c. 1556

Carafa was elected, and began dealing with real or imagined enemies. First Ascanio della Corgna came under suspicion. He was general of the papal cavalry, and was actually suspected of being loyal to the Emperor. Paul IV had him sent to the Castel S. Angelo, along with his brother, Cardinal della Corgna (27 July 1556). Both were nephews of Pope Julius III. The cardinal had been Administrator of the Diocese of Spoleto on the appointment of Julius III, but Paul IV immediately replaced him with Cardinal Alessandro Farnese. The charge against the cardinal that brought him to the Castel S. Angelo was that he had attempted to open communications with Philip II of Spain. The pressure of Spanish victories in Lombardy and Tuscany, however, forced their release.

Then it was the turn of Cardinal Morone, a man of tested prudence and familiar with Germany. He had been chosen as the Papal Legate to the Imperial Diet in Augsburg, on the insistence of both Charles V and his brother Ferdinand. He received the Legatine cross on 13 February 1555, and was in Augsburg on 23 March, the day Pope Julius III died. He therefore arrived in Rome too late for the April Conclave. In the second Conclave, a month later, both Pole and Morone were Imperial candidates, but Cardinal Carafa (a candidate himself) loudly voiced his suspicions that both were heretics.

Suddenly, on 31 May 1557, Morone was arrested by the Pope's nephew and Secretary of State personally. Pietro Carnesecchi, a former adherent of Morone, wrote: "Why Morone is imprisoned, no one knows; many say that the Cardinals have brought it about, in order that he may be out of their way at the next election of a Pope, when he would get the greatest number of votes. The Pope intends summoning all the Cardinals to Rome, that they as a college may judge Morone." There was an immediate outcry. The cardinals wanted a Congregation be held at which explanations would be demanded. Paul IV took the initiative and held a Congregation at which he presided, telling the cardinals that it was not politics but the honor of God that was involved. The process against Morone would be carried out by the members of the Inquisition. Twenty-one charges were levelled at him. On 12 June 1557, Morone was interrogated in the Castel S. Angelo by the committee: Cardinals Innocenzo del Monte, Jean Suau, Scipione Rebiba, Spoletano [Alessandro Farnese], and Michele Ghislieri. Having examined him and heard his extensive rejoinders, the committee reported in favor of Morone but Paul IV was not satisfied. Morone remained in the Castel S. Angelo until the death of Paul IV, when the College of Cardinals ordered his release. Cardinal Rebiba was sent as Nuncio to France, to discuss the matter of an alliance with Henri II.

== France or Spain ==
For two decades, the Farnese had been trying to maintain friendships both with King Henri II of France and the Emperor Charles V of the Holy Roman Empire. This became more difficult when Cardinal Carafa, in the name of Paul IV, concluded a treaty with Henri II on 23 July 1556, committing them to a war against the Emperor for the Kingdom of Naples. In 1557, the efforts collapsed. On 23 October 1557, Henri struck against Cardinal Alessandro Farnese, issuing letters patent by which he confiscated all of the benefices of the Cardinal which he still enjoyed in France. The Abbeys of St. Étienne de Caën, Beauport in Brittany, and Granselve, as well as the Administratorship of the Diocese of Viviers, were also included. In the document, Henri complained of the Cardinal and his brothers taking the part of the King of Spain. The total loss for the Cardinal alone amounted to more than 30.000 francs. The benefices were all given to Cardinal Ippolito II d'Este, Farnese's enemy, who had spent his youth at the French Court and was a personal friend of Henri and the Royal Family.

These losses were in addition to those inflicted by Pope Julius III, whose election had been opposed by Cardinal Farnese in the interest of Pope Paul III's secretary, Marcello Cervini. One of those was the Governorship of Tivoli, which also went to Cardinal d'Este. Another was the Patriarchate of Jerusalem, which was granted away only twenty days after the end of the Conclave.

But Julius III (Monte) had died in 1555, as had Marcellus II (Cervini). The Emperor Charles V had retired in 1556 and died in 1558 and both Paul IV and Henri II died in 1559, within a month of each other. A new and brighter day dawned.

== Conclave of 1559 ==
For the approaching Conclave, King Philip II of Spain let it be known that his choices were Cardinals Rodolfo Pio de Carpi, Giacomo Puteo, Giovanni Angelo de' Medici, and Clemente d' Olera. In contrast, the French king François II was promoting the nomination of Cardinals Ippolito d'Este, François de Tournon, and Ercole Gonzaga. Cardinal Farnese, who was 38 years old and the senior Cardinal Deacon by this point, disliked both d'Este and his cousin Gonzaga, and therefore decided to do everything he could to see the election of Carpi.

Farnese could only effectively directly influence four or five of the votes, and so had to work in alliance with another group - allying himself with the cardinals created by Paul IV and who were being led by his nephew, Cardinal Carlo Carafa. This eventually led to the election of Cardinal de' Medici, and Farnese crowned the new pope on 6 January 1560. The new Cardinal Nephews were Carlo Borromeo and Markus Sittich von Hohenems Altemps.

== Conclave of 1566 ==
During the reign of Pope Pius IV, Cardinal Farnese enjoyed good fortune. The Pope was a friend of his, and he was able to avoid the unpleasantries of international affairs, as he built a circle of friends in the College of Cardinals and in the Roman Curia. On 14 April 1564, Cardinal Farnese was promoted to the title of Cardinal Priest of S. Lorenzo in Damaso, a post he held for less than a month. On 12 May, he was promoted to the Order of Cardinal Bishops with the diocese of Sabina. He distanced himself from the horrors surrounding the fall of the Carafa nephews in 1561. Pius was not a healthy man, and his anticipated demise gave Farnese and others time to plan. Pope Pius IV (Medici) died on 9 December 1565.

The French, at this time Catherine de' Medici, having learned nothing from 1555 or 1559, still offered their support to Cardinal Ippolito d'Este. King Philip II favored d' Olera, Ghislieri, Ricci, Morone, and Pacecho. When the Spanish Ambassador, Don Luis Requesens de Zuniga, arrived in Rome on 21 December 1565, however, he carried instructions to support Ghislieri and Morone. He was suspicious of the orthodoxy of Cardinal Morone though, and he feared that Cardinal Farnese might pursue a vendetta against Spain for the murder of his father if he were to become pope. The Emperor Maximilian II was informed by his agent in Rome, Nosti Camiani, that the most favored cardinals were: d' Olera, Boncompagni, Suau, Sirleto, Simonetta, Gianbernardino Scotti, and Michele Ghislieri. He wrote directly to Cosimo III of Florence, asking for his assistance in the election. Cosimo replied that he was no longer in the business of influencing papal elections, but agreed to serve the Emperor's wishes. He was in fact very active behind the scenes. He wanted a pope who would make him Duke of Tuscany, and would validate his control over Siena, and he had already picked out Cardinal Ghislieri. The Duchess of Ferrara, a daughter of the Emperor, was recommending Cardinal Francesco Gonzaga, the 27 year old nephew of Cardinal Ercole Gonzaga (who had died in 1563), for whom she was soliciting the Emperor, the Duke of Savoy and the King of France, Francois II. The Duchess of Savoy was pushing for Cardinal Ferrero, who was only 28 years old. The nephews of Pius IV, Cardinal Borromeo and Cardinal Altemps, had another candidate in mind, the Nuncio in Spain, Cardinal Ugo Boncompagni, and they sent a swift galley to fetch him. He did not arrive in time though. And then there was Cardinal Alessandro Farnese, who was campaigning for himself.

There were fifty-two cardinals in attendance on 20 December 1565. Seventeen cardinals were under the age of forty, seven of whom were under the age of thirty. Cardinal Farnese, nephew of Pope Paul III, had in his faction Cardinals Corregio, Gambara, Savelli, Paleotti and Orsini. Farnese was personally beloved by the Roman populace as a patron of the poor and a Maecenas of the arts. The cardinals who had been created by Paul IV were also supporting Farnese. They included: Vitelli (the Camerlengo), Capizucchi, Reuman Suau, Rebiba, Ghislieri, and D' Olera. The cardinals created by Pius IV numbered nine, and under certain circumstances might draw four more. The Gonzaga faction had six members. The cardinals created by Julius III numbered five. The Florentines had between four and six. The Venetians had three. Six French cardinals did not come to the Conclave at all. The large number of factions would present a major difficulty for anyone trying to put together a two-thirds majority. Nationality was not the only way of dividing up the cardinals either. There were the seniors and the juniors, and the eager reformers and the complacent majority.

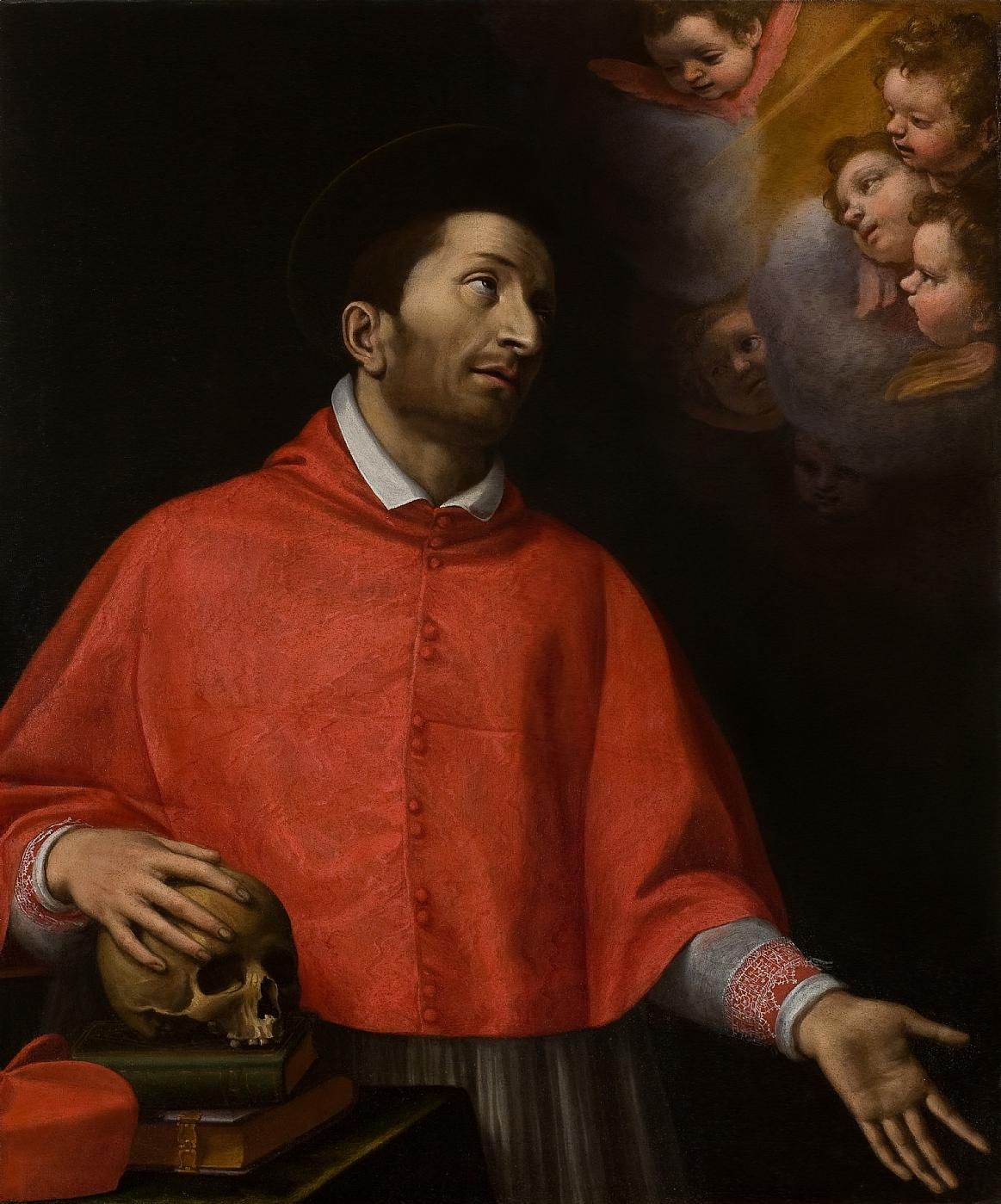
Cardinal Carlo Borromeo

As soon as the Conclave opened, Cardinal Borromeo, who, as the nephew of the late pope, considered himself a leader, if not a pope-maker, approached Cardinal Farnese, who had the largest number of commitments. He indicated that he thought that Cardinal Morone should be pope. This was in accordance with the wishes of the Emperor, and Morone had been one of the Presidents of the Council of Trent. Farnese seemed friendly and willing to please, which Borromeo (wrongly) took as an agreement to supply votes. There were those who would never vote for a friend of the Emperor, and there were those who remembered Morone's troubles with the Inquisition, and the bull of Paul IV which had stated that no one who was arrested, imprisoned, or convicted by the Inquisition could ever vote in a papal election, let alone be elected pope. In addition, there were those who did not like Morone personally. It is alleged that both Alessandro Farnese and Ippolito d'Este had grudges against Morone due to decisions which he had made while Legate in Bologna. His enemies could always muster more than one-third of the college to block his election. When it came to a vote, Morone got twenty-nine votes. Farnese must have realized that he was in somewhat the same situation himself. He could muster between twenty-eight and thirty votes, but not the thirty-five needed to elect.

In his straightforward way, Borromeo then went on to his second candidate, Cardinal Sirleto, but he too failed. Borromeo went to Farnese, and stated flatly that he was not going to support Farnese in the current Conclave, and he asked Farnese to help him in choosing a worthy pope. Farnese suggested the names of four cardinals whom he would support: Gianbernardino Scotti (Trani), D' Olera (Aracoeli), Ghislieri (Alessandrino) and Ricci (Montepulciano). Borromeo was delighted with the naming of Cardinal Ghislieri:

Having known the Cardinal of Alessandria [Ghislieri] for a considerable time, and conceived a high esteem for him on account of his singular holiness and zeal, I judged that no more fitting Pontiff than he could be found to rule the Christian commonwealth wisely and well. I therefore took up his cause with all my might; and with little delay he was elected Pope to the great satisfaction of all. Nothing could be so great a consolation to me in my grief for my uncle, as the certainty that he is succeeded by one who possesses all the qualities that your Eminence sympathizes with me in lamenting, and who with equal courage and strength of soul will know how to maintain and uphold the authority of religion

Within two hours, they had sufficient votes to elect Ghislieri. It was 7 January 1566. That afternoon, the Cardinals assembled and took a vote; two cardinals voted from their sickbeds. The votes were not by secret ballot, but out loud. Ghislieri was elected unanimously and took the name Pius V. Borromeo and Farnese had made a pope.

By 1569, the Cardinal was Legatus perpetuus (Permanent legate) of the province of the Patrimony of St. Peter, resident in Viterbo. This is recorded on the inscription of a new town gate.

In 1569, Cardinal Alessandro Farnese made his journey to Sicily, to inspect his Archdiocese of Monreale. Transportation was provided by four galleys lent by the Knights of St. John of Jerusalem. At Monreale, he conducted a diocesan synod. He resigned the diocese on 9 December 1573.

On 7 October 1571, the Battle of Lepanto took place in the Gulf of Corinth. The Christian fleet, commanded by King Philip II's half-brother, Don John of Austria, inflicted a decisive defeat on the Ottoman Turks, destroying all but thirty of its ships. Cardinal Farnese was on the docks at Civitavecchia to welcome home the hero, his brother's brother-in-law.

== Conclave of 1572 ==
One of the determining factors in the minds of the electors was the recent Battle of Lepanto (7 October 1571). It had been a stunning defeat for the Ottoman Turks, the first naval defeat in more than a century, and nearly their entire navy was destroyed. But they did not lose control over the Eastern Mediterranean, and they were already rebuilding their navy at lightning speed. In some people's minds, what was needed was a pope who could hold the various forces together: a Crusading pope who would also be generous with Church money to finance the war. The new pope must also be a strong and strict defender of the Faith in the face of unorthodoxy and one who would enforce the decrees of the Council of Trent (1545–1547; 1551–1552; 1562–1563).

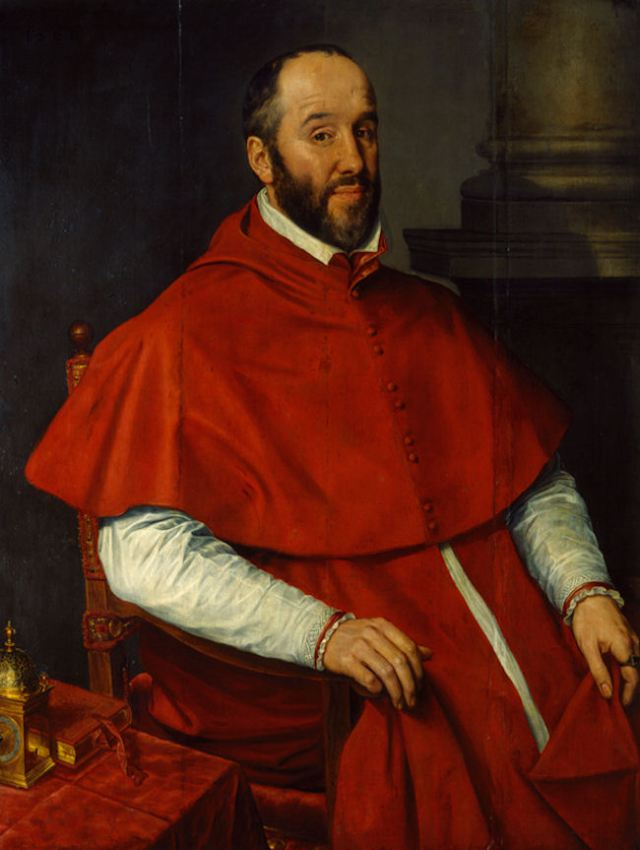
Cardinal Antonio Granvelle

There were other problems that a pope would have to face. Queen Elizabeth I of England had been excommunicated by Pius V, and she had obtained possession of Mary, Queen of Scots. Mary's relatives, the Guises, were the leaders of the devout hyper-Catholic party in France, who were eager for a show-down with the Huguenots. Catherine de' Medici was attempting to avoid a civil war in France, and she believed that the marriage of her daughter Margot with Henri of Navarre, a Protestant, might avert disaster but dispensations would be required of the pope. She was also trying to tempt Queen Elizabeth into marriage with her son, Henri, and that would require papal cooperation as well. Her choice was the Cardinal of Ferrara, Ippolito d'Este, who was as disliked in 1572 as he had been in 1549. His collection of enemies had grown to include Cardinals Bonelli, Borromeo, Farnese, Medici, and Morone. Catherine, however, was in contact with her cousin, Cosimo I, Grand Duke of Tuscany, who, behind the scenes, was promoting Cardinal Boncompagni. Cardinal de' Medici was to inform the leaders of the Faction of Pius IV, Borromeo and Altemps, that the Medici were interested only in Sirleto and Boncompagni. With the French and Florentine votes, in fact, Cardinal d'Este had the resources to block any candidate he pleased (the 'virtual veto').

D'Este, however, was not electable. The cardinals of Pius V (some twelve or thirteen votes) were joined with many of those of Pius IV to prevent the election of d'Este, but also of Farnese, Ricci, and Burali d' Arezzo. Cardinal Giovanni Morone was also a candidate again, but Cardinal Bonelli (Alessandrino, the nephew of Pius V) was prepared to use his votes to exclude him. His friends nonetheless made an effort to have him elected by acclamation on the opening day of the Conclave, 12 May, but the attempt failed.

Cardinal Farnese believed that this was his conclave, and he was making every effort to win supporters. He knew, however, that the Spanish were against him. On the night of the opening of the Conclave, Cardinal Granvelle arrived from Naples. He had been sent to Italy by Philip II in 1571 to prepare the fleet which eventually met the Turks at Lepanto; he was kept on as Viceroy of Naples. Shortly after his entry into the Conclave, he produced an unopened letter which (he said) had reached him while he was on the highway from Naples. It was from Philip II. Granvelle opened the letter in Cardinal Farnese's presence and read the contents, which ordered Granvelle to advise Farnese that he was not to attempt to become pope "this time"—it should be remembered that, experienced as he was, Cardinal Farnese was only fifty-one. Farnese's chances ended on the first day of the Conclave.

Boncompagni was the obvious candidate. He was acceptable to Cardinal Borromeo and the reformers. He was a successful nuncio in Spain, and was acceptable to the Spanish faction, which included Naples. The Conclave turned out to be a very short one. On 14 May, Ugo Boncompagni was elected pope, and took the name Gregory XIII. He was crowned by Cardinal Ippolito d'Este, the senior Cardinal Deacon, on 20 May 1572. Cardinal d'Este, one of Alessandro Farnese's favorite enemies, died on 2 December 1572.

== Conclave of 1585 ==
In the Spring of 1585, an embassy from Japan was making its way to Rome. They arrived by ship at Livorno on 1 March, and proceeded by land through Tuscany. They were received in Florence by the Grand Duke Francesco de' Medici. They proceeded on to Rome, accompanied by Cardinal Francesco Gambara, and were received with a grand show of hospitality at Caprarola by Cardinal Alessandro Farnese. Accompanied by Gambara and Farnese, the embassy reached Rome on 22 March.

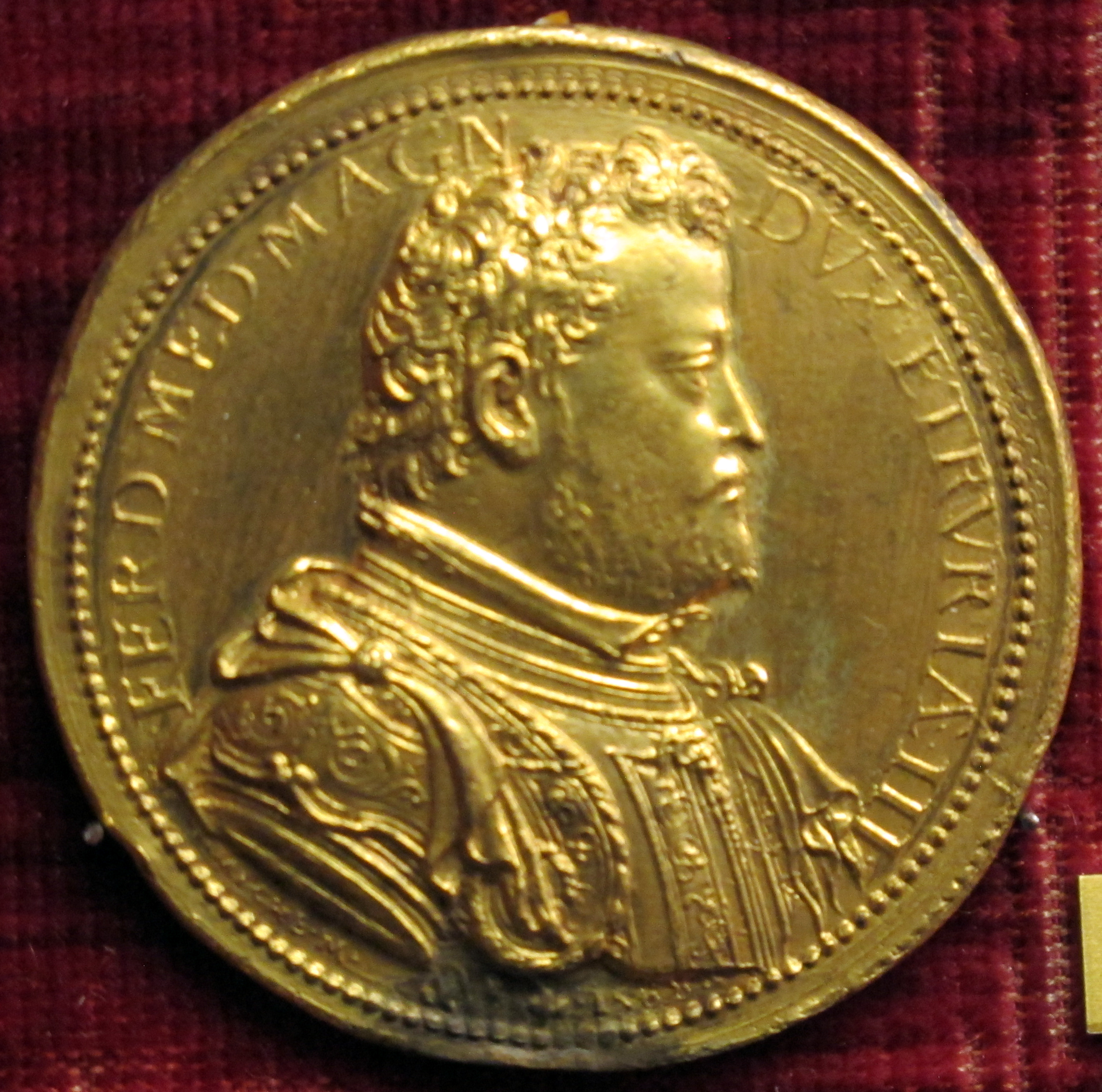
Cardinal Ferdinando de' Medici

Pope Gregory XIII died after thirteen years on the Throne of Peter on 10 April 1585. There were sixty-two living cardinals, but only thirty-two managed to make it to Rome in time for the opening ceremonies of the Conclave on Easter Sunday, 21 April 1585. Cardinal Farnese, though he was only sixty-four years old, was the senior cardinal present. He was both Dean of the Sacred College of Cardinals and Cardinal Bishop of Ostia. But he was no faction leader. Thirty-nine cardinals, many of them his friends and supporters, had died during the reign of Gregory XIII. There was only one other cardinal present who had been created by his grandfather, Paul III. The Imperial-Spanish faction was headed by Cardinal Ferdinando de' Medici, brother of the Grand Duke of Tuscany, and soon to become the Grand Duke himself. The actual Spanish leader was Cardinal Ludovico Madruzzo but he did not arrive in Rome until the evening of 23 April. The French faction was headed by Ludovico d'Este, grandson of Louis XII and Protector of France before the Holy See.

After the first vote, on 23 April, it was obvious that neither a strong Spanish candidate nor a strong French candidate could be elected. Medici and d'Este met, and Medici proposed two possible compromise candidates to d'Este: Cardinal Albani and Cardinal Felice Peretti Montalto. Madruzzo's chosen candidate was Cardinal Sirleto, but in a meeting with d'Este shortly after he entered the Conclave on the 24th, it was made clear to him that Sirleto was being excluded by the votes of the French. Madruzzo declared that he would not accept Albani. D'Este met with Cardinal Farnese, hoping to stop any effort that Farnese might begin to exclude Montalto. He had already been trying to organize some of Gregory XIII's cardinals into a faction of his own. Farnese already believed that Montalto had little real support, and d'Este encouraged that misapprehension. But, when all the likely votes were tallied, it seemed that the supporters of Montalto lacked four votes, which would have to come from Farnese. When the Cardinals assembled to begin the balloting, d'Este suddenly intervened and announced that it was not necessary to proceed to a ballot since they already had a pope—Cardinal Montalto. The cardinals immediately proceeded to "adore" Montalto—which was a legitimate method for electing a pope. There had to be no opposition, and there was none. Farnese had been silenced and coerced into cooperation.

In the Spring of 1586, Cardinal Farnese's young nephew Ranuccio, aged 17, came to Rome to swear allegiance for his domains of which the Church was the feudal souverain. He made the mistake of appearing before Pope Sixtus V in armor carrying weapons, and for that horrible crime he was imprisoned in the Castel S. Angelo. His uncle the Cardinal pleaded twice with the Pope to have him released, and finally contrived to have Ranuccio escape. The Spanish Ambassador, Olivares, invited the Castellan of the Castel S. Angelo to dinner, while the Cardinal tricked the guards into releasing Ranuccio into his custody. The Pope was livid at having been circumvented.

== Legacy as collector and patron ==
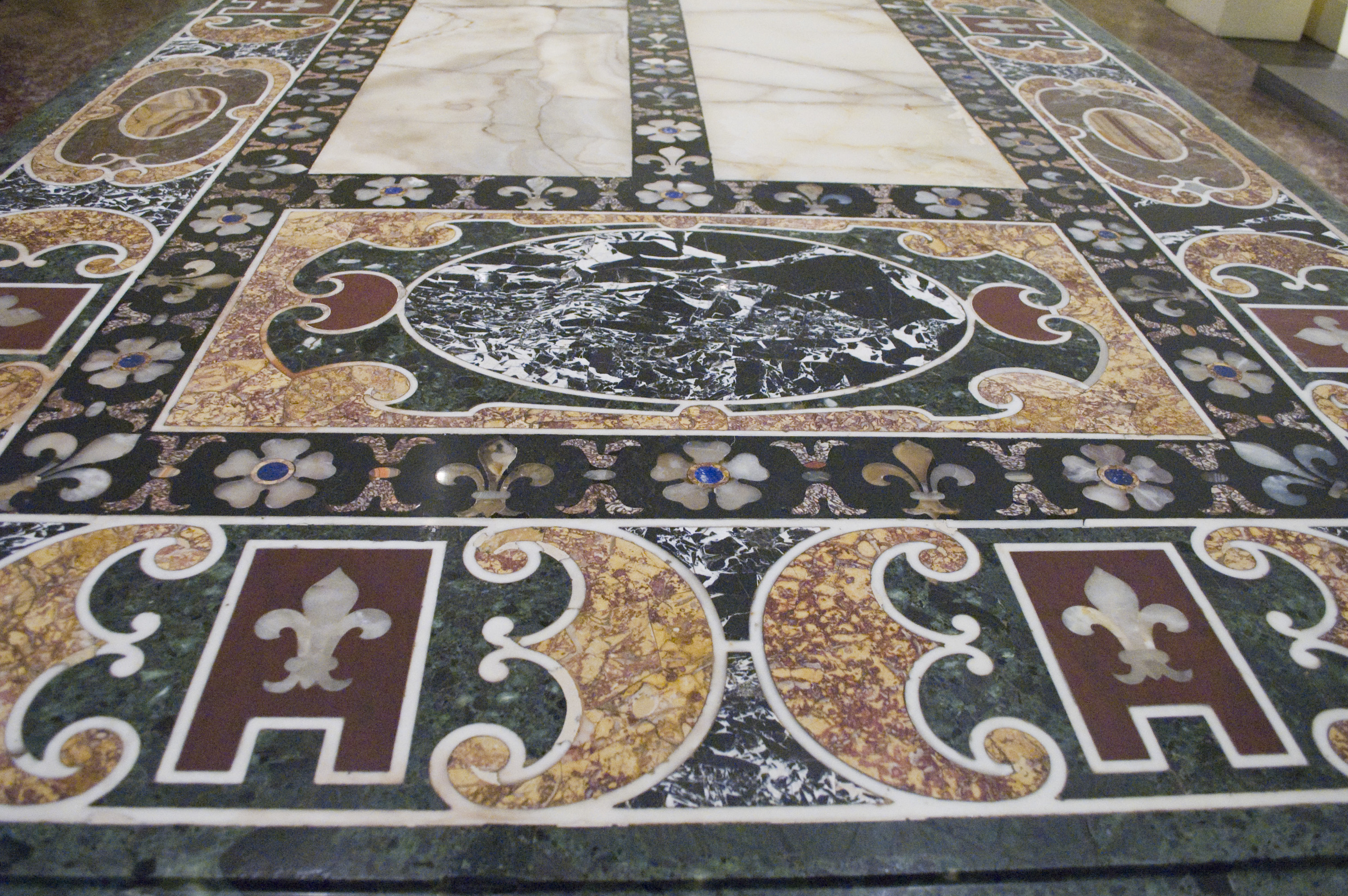
Table to a design by Vignola, marble inlaid with alabaster and hardstones, made for Alessandro Farnese (detail of table top Metropolitan Museum of Art)

The buildings that Cardinal Farnese built or restored include the Church of the Gesù in Rome, the Villa Farnese at Caprarola, and the Farnese palace near Lake Bracciano, and the monastery Tre Fontane.

Alessandro Farnese is remembered for gathering the greatest collection of Roman sculpture assembled in private hands since Antiquity, now mostly in Naples, after passing by inheritance to the Bourbon-Parma kings. His generosity towards artists made a virtual academy at the house he built at Caprarola, and in his lodgings at Palazzo della Cancellaria and, after his brother Cardinal Ranuccio Farnese died in 1565, at the Palazzo Farnese. In the Palazzo Farnese the best sculptors worked under his eye, to restore fragments of antiquities as complete sculptures, with great scholarly care. He was also a great patron of living artists including, most notably, El Greco. Under the direction of his curator and librarian, the antiquarian iconographer Fulvio Orsini, the Farnese collections were enlarged and systematized. Farnese collected ancient coins and commissioned modern medals. He had paintings by Titian, Michelangelo, and Raphael, and an important collection of drawings. He commissioned the masterpiece of Giulio Clovio, arguably the last major illuminated manuscript, the Farnese Hours, which was completed in 1546 after being nine years in the making (now the property of the Morgan Library, New York). The studiolo built to house this collection appears to be the one re-erected at the Musée de la Renaissance, Écouen.

In 1550, Farnese acquired a northern portion of Palatine Hill in Rome and had Roman ruins from the palace built by the Roman Emperor Tiberius (A. D. 14–37) at the northwest end filled in, and converted to a summer home and formal gardens. The Farnese Gardens became one of the first botanical gardens in Europe. From these gardens are derived the names of Acacia farnesiana and, from its floral essence, the important biochemical farnesol.

== Descendants ==
Cardinal Alessandro Farnese had a daughter Clelia Farnese, with Claude de Beaune de Semblançay, dame de Châteaubrun, a lady-in-waiting and confidante of Catherine de Medicis, born in 1556. Claude de Beaune's brother Martin became Bishop of Puy (1557–1561) and her other brother, Renaud, Bishop of Mende (1571–1581) and then Archbishop of Bourges. In 1570, Clelia married Giangiorgio Cesarini, Marchese of Civitanova, Gonfaloniere of the City of Rome (1565–1585). In September 1572, they had a son, Giuliano. Clelia's husband died in 1585. On 2 August 1587, at the Farnese palace in Caprarola, she married her second husband, Marco Pio di Savoia, Lord of Sassuolo; the marriage was without issue. Clelia died in 1613. The absence of scandal concerning her birth suggests that Cardinal Farnese was not yet in Holy Orders ca. 1555–1556.

== Death and monument: The Gesù ==
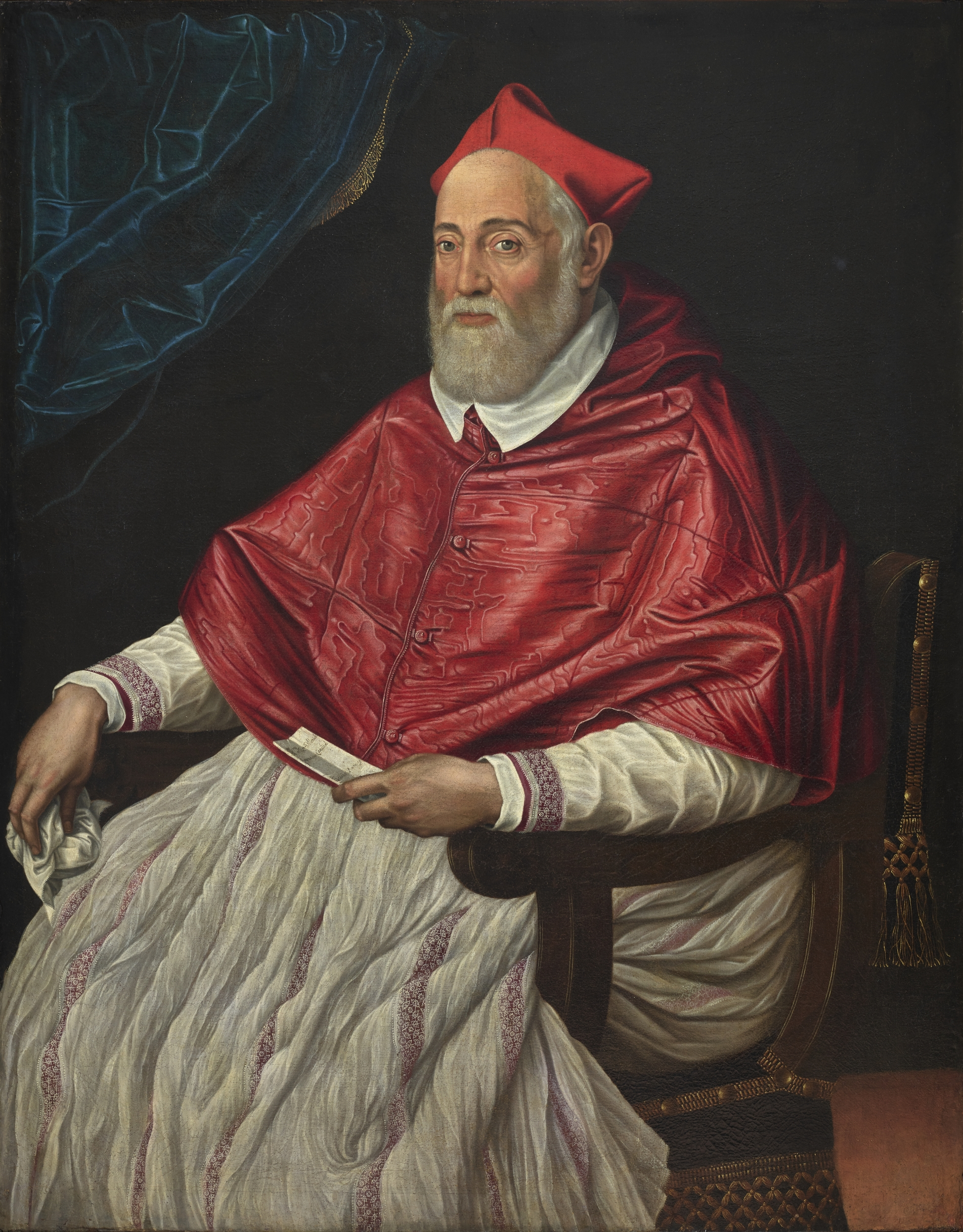
Portrait of Cardinal Farnese by Scipione Pulzone, c. 1579

Cardinal Alessandro Farnese wrote a will in 1580, and added codicils in 1585, but these were revoked and replaced by a new will, written on 22 June 1588, with codicils added in July and August.

On 7 July 1588, the physician of the Duke of Urbino, Vincenzo Remosetti, was summoned to a consultation at the Farnese Palace at Caprarola, "per uno grande accidente di epilepsia", accompanied by severe respiratory problems. The Cardinal was gravely ill. He was subjected to the usual quackery, cautery and bleeding. He was attended by Msgr. Camillo Caetani, the brother of Cardinal Enrico Caetani, who kept his brother informed of Farnese's condition. On 13 August, the doctor had to return to Rome; he left the Cardinal restless and weak, and suffering from gout in his left arm. On 28 February 1589, he suffered an attack of some sort, perhaps a stroke. Cardinal Farnese died quietly of the effects of apoplexy in Rome on 2 March 1589, at the age of sixty eight.

He was buried before the high altar in the Church of the Gesù. Forty-two cardinals participated in the funeral ceremonies.

Above the main door of that church, on the interior side, is the famous inscription:

ALEXANDER. FARNESIVS

CARD. S. R. E. VICECANCELL
PAVLI. III. PONT. MAX. NEPOS
CVIVS. AVCTORITATE. SOCIETAS
IESV. RECEPTA. PRIMVM, FVIT
ET. DECRETIS. AMPLISS. ORNATA
TEMPLVM. HOC. SUAE. MONVMENTVM
RELIGIONIS. ET. PERPETVAE
IN. EVM. ORDINEM. VOLVNTATIS
A. FVNDAMENTIS. EXTRVXIT
ANNO. IVBILEI. M. D. LXXV

commemorating the establishment of the Jesuit Order by Paul III in 1540, and the building of the Church of the Gesù for them through the generosity of Cardinal Farnese. The church, the work of Giacomo Vignola and Giacomo della Porta (1568–1575), is one of the great monuments of Counter-Reformation religious architecture.

== For further reading ==
- Affò, Ireneo. La vita di Pier Luigi Farnese (Milano: Giusti 1821).
- Barbiche, Bernard; de Dainville-Barbiche, Ségolène (1985). "Les légats à latere en France et leurs facultés aux XVIe et XVIIe siècles". Archivum Historiae Pontificiae. 23: 93–165. JSTOR 23564223.
- Bauer, Stefan. The Invention of Papal History: Onofrio Panvinio between Renaissance and Catholic Reform (Oxford: Oxford University Press 2020).
- Cardella, Lorenzo. Memorie de' Cardinali della Santa Romana Chiesa IV (Roma: Pagliarini 1793), pp. 136–140.
- Caro, Annibal. Delle Lettere del Commendatore Annibal Caro scritte a nome del Cardinale Alessandro Farnese 3 volumes (Milano 1807).
- Flaminio Maria Annibali, Notizie storiche della casa Farnese 2 parts (Montefiascone 1818).
- Del Vecchio, Edoardo. I Farnese. (Roma: Istituto di studi romani editore 1972).
- Drei, G. I Farnesi. Grandezza e decadenza di una dinastia (Roma 1954).
- Frangipani, Camillo Trasmondo. Memorie sulla vita e i fatti del Cardinale Alessandro Farnese (Roma: Sinimberghi 1876).
- Gamrath, Helge. Farnese: Pomp, Power and Politics in Renaissance Italy (Roma: Bretschneider 2007).
- Rabbi Solari, G. Storie di casa Farnese (Milano: Mondadori 1964).
- Nasalli-Rocca, E. I Farnesi (Milano: Dall'Oglio 1969).
- Panvinius, Onuphrius (1529–1568). "De vita Pont. Pauli III," in B. Platina, Historia B. Platinae de vitis Pontificum Romanorum (Cologne: Josue Cholin 1600), 385–405. There is an Italian translation in: Storia delle vite de' Pontefici di Bartolommeo Platina e d' altri autori edizione novissima IV (Venezia: Domenico Ferrarin 1765), pp. 44–70.
- Petruccelli della Gattina (1864). Histoire diplomatique des conclaves. (in French). Volume 2. Paris: A. Lacroix, Verboeckhoven, 1864.
- Robertson, Clare. 'Il Gran Cardinale'. Alessandro Farnese, Patron of the Arts. New Haven: Yale University Press, 1992.
- Rosini, Patrizia. La malattia del Cardinale Alessandro Farnese (2008).
- Arnold Alexander Witte, The Artful Hermitage: The Palazzetto Farnese as a Counter-reformation Diaeta (Roma: Bretschneider 2008).
- Papal conclave, 1549-1550. Sede Vacante and Conclave of 1549--1550 (Dr. J. P. Adams).
- Rosini, Patrizia. La malattia del Cardinale Alessandro Farnese (2008).

Catholic Church titles
Preceded by Giovanni Colonna	Archpriest of Archbasilca in San Giovanni in Laterano; 1503–1534	Succeeded by Giovanni Domenico de Cupis
Preceded by Alessandro Farnese (Paul III)	Apostolic Administrator of the Diocese of Parma; 1534–1535	Succeeded by Guido Ascanio Sforza di Santa Fiora
Preceded by Esteban Gabriel Merino	Apostolic Administrator of the Diocese of Jaén; 1535–1537	Succeeded by Card. Alessandro Cesarini
Preceded by Ippolito de' Medici	Apostolic Administrator of the Diocese of Avignon; 1535–1551	Succeeded by Annibale Bozzuti
Preceded by Ippolito de' Medici	Archbishop of Monreale; 1536–1573	Succeeded by Luis Torres
Preceded by Lopez de Alarcon	Apostolic Administrator of the Diocese of Bitonto; 1537–1538	Succeeded by Sebastiano Delio
Preceded by Girolamo Ghianderoni	Apostolic Administrator of the Diocese of Massa Maritima; 1538–1547	Succeeded by Bernardino Maffei
Preceded by Girolamo Ghinucci	Apostolic Administrator of the Diocese of Cavaillon; 1540–1541	Succeeded by Pietro Ghinucci
Preceded by Miguel II. da Silva	Apostolic Administrator of the Diocese of Viseu; 1547–1552	Succeeded by Gonçalo Pinheiro
Preceded by Étienne Poncher	Apostolic Administrator of the Diocese of Tours; 1553–1554	Succeeded by Simon de Maillé
Preceded by Paul de Carretto	Perpetual Apostolic Administrator of the Diocese of Cahors; 1554–1557	Succeeded by Pierre de Bertrand
Preceded by Giovanni della Casa	Apostolic Administrator of the Diocese of Benevento; 1556–1560	Succeeded by Alfonso Carafa
Preceded by Giovanni Girolamo Morone	Cardinal-bishop of Sabina; 1564–1565	Succeeded by Ranuccio Farnese
Preceded by Giovanni Girolamo Morone	Cardinal-bishop of Frascati; 1565–1578	Succeeded by Giacomo Savelli
Preceded by Cristoforo Madruzzi	Cardinal-bishop of Porto; 1578–1580	Succeeded by Fulvio Corneo
Preceded by Giovanni Girolamo Morone	Cardinal-bishop of Ostia; 1580–1589	Succeeded by Giovanni Antonio Serbelloni
Preceded by Giovanni Girolamo Morone	Dean of the College of Cardinals; 1580–1589	Succeeded by Giovanni Antonio Serbelloni
