= Portrait of Pope Paul III (Titian) =

Painting by Titian

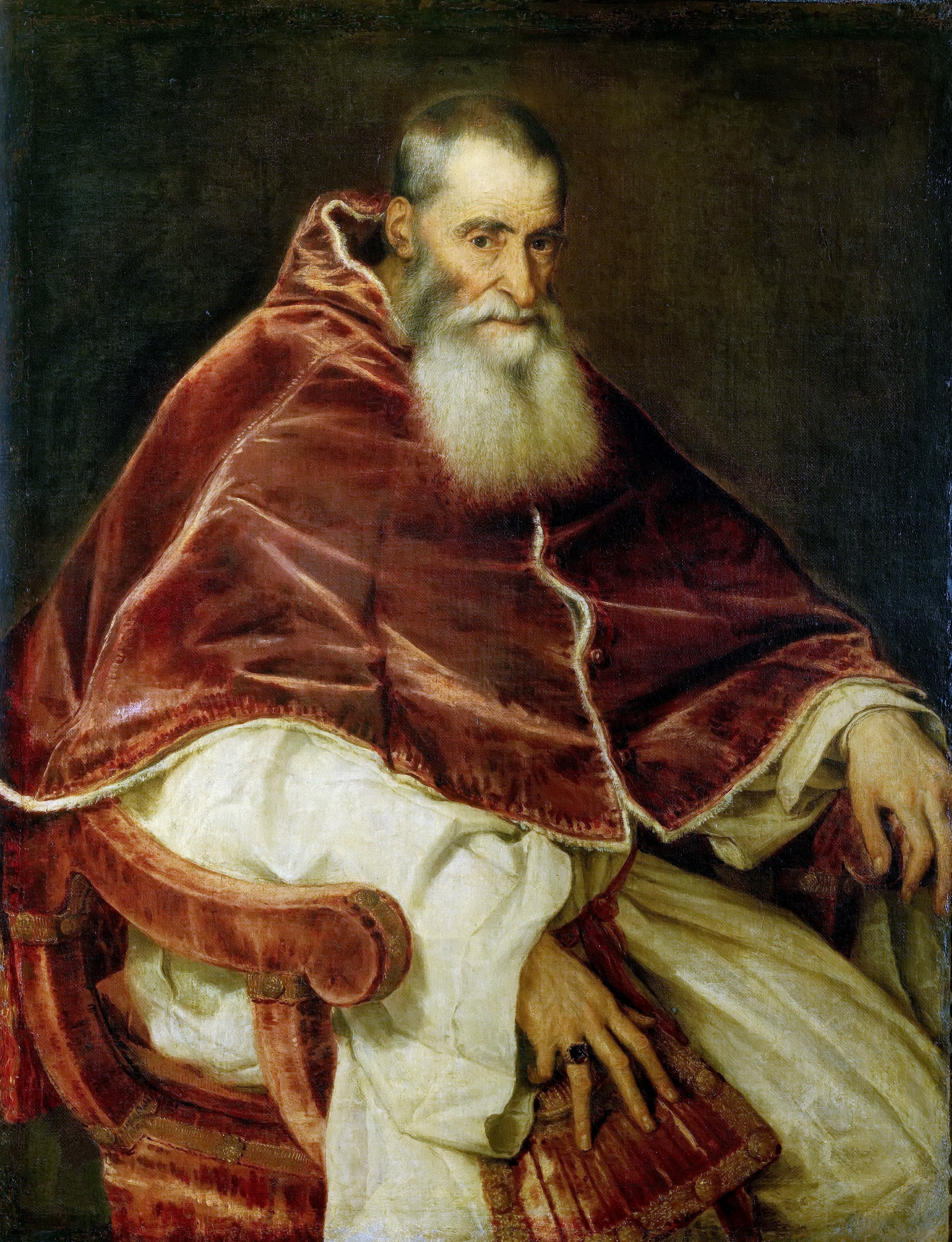
- Artist: Titian
- Year: 1543
- Medium: Oil on canvas
- Dimensions: 113.7 cm × 88.8 cm (44.8 in × 35.0 in)
- Location: Museo di Capodimonte, Naples

Portrait of Pope Paul III (or Portrait of Pope Paul III Without Cap) is an oil on canvas portrait by Titian of Pope Paul III, produced during the pope's visit to Northern Italy, in 1543. It is in the collection of the Museo di Capodimonte, in Naples.

== History and description ==
The work was completed by Titian during a meeting with Paul III in Ferrara, in April 1543 during a period of tension and political uncertainty leading up to the Council of Trent.

The pope is depicted with unflinching realism and as an old, tired and distrustful man, but who nevertheless has an intelligent and sharp expression. The painting is a reinterpretation of Raphael's Portrait of Pope Julius II. Characteristic of Titian's late style, it consists of broad brushstroke and loose definition in the form. The artist produced a slightly different variant two years later, also preserved in Naples, which shows Paul III wearing a camauro.

The portrait of was inherited by Elisabeth Farnese, mother of Charles of Bourbon, who took it to Naples in 1734 to be exhibited in the palace of Capodimonte, where it remains today.

There are several replicas of the same painting. One of them, preserved in the cathedral of Toledo, was traditionally attributed to Titian, who would have made it two years after the original. However, this attribution has been rejected by some authors, who have identified it as a later replica, possibly made by Anthony van Dyck.

== Gallery ==
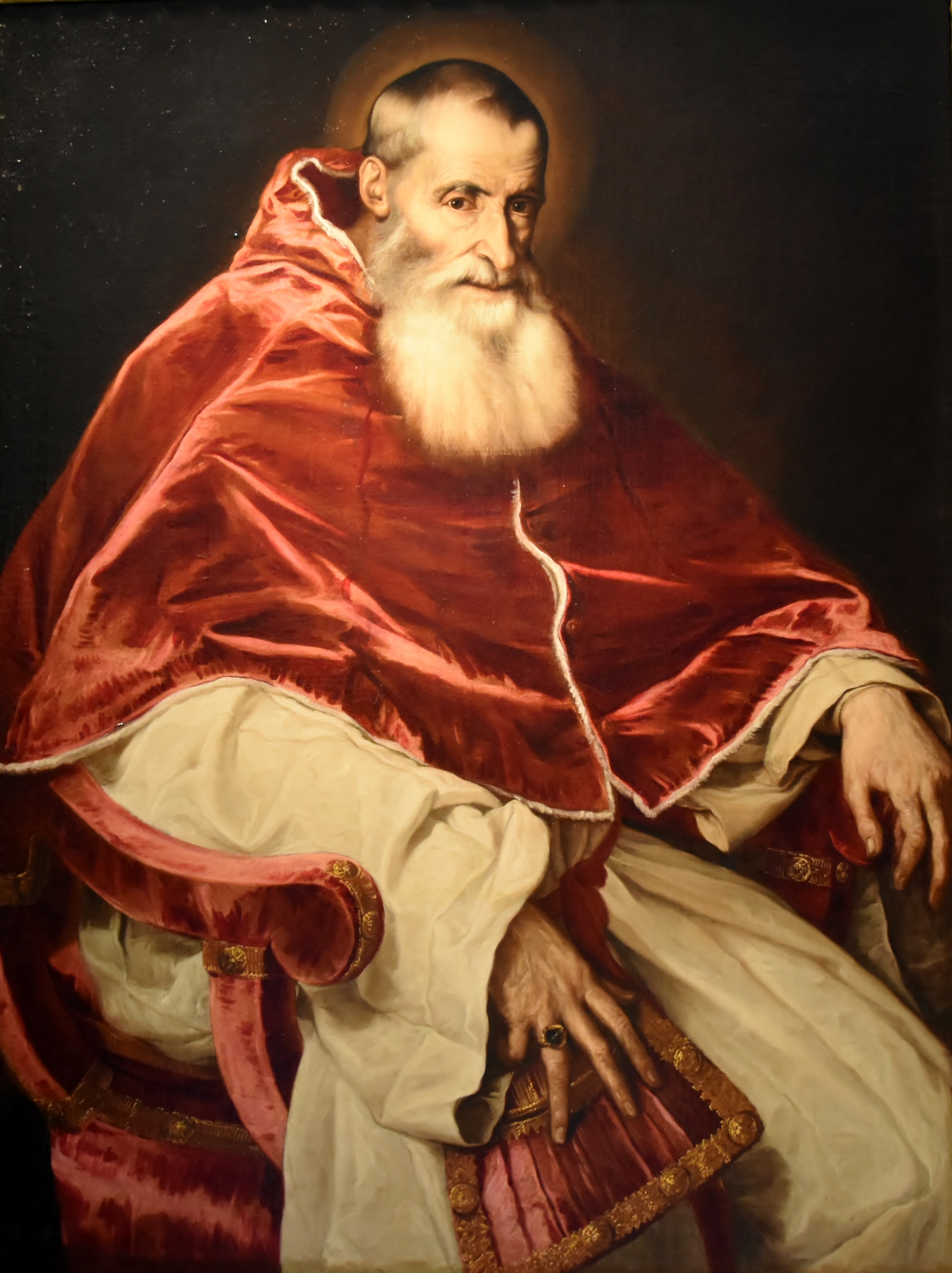
The c. 1545 copy attributed to Titian now in Toledo Cathedral, Spain.

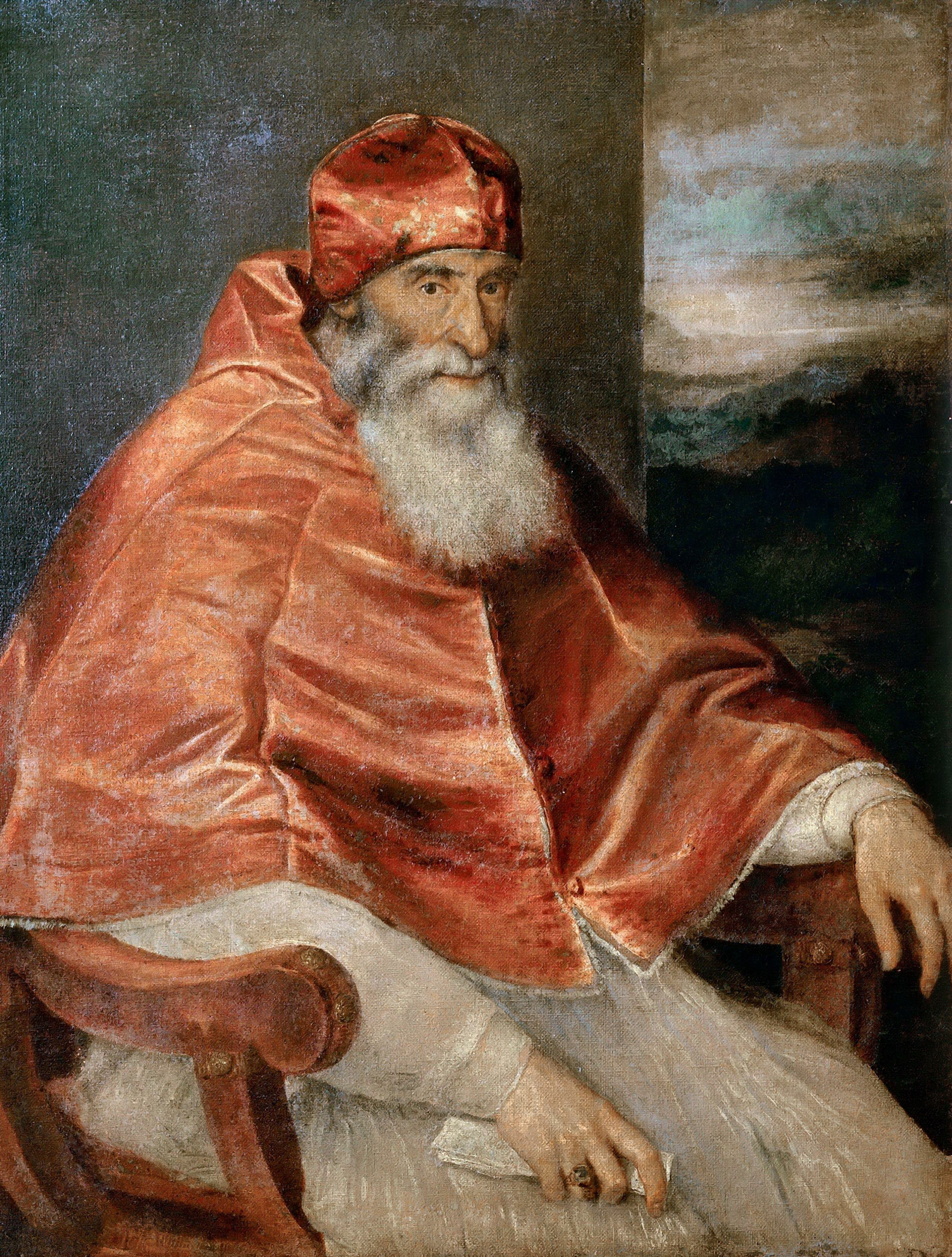
Pope Paul III with camauro (1546), Titian's slightly later variant of the original painting.
