= Farnese =

Farnese may refer to:

== People ==
- House of Farnese, Italian dynasty
  - Ranuccio Farnese (1390–1450)
  - Pope Paul III, born Alessandro Farnese (1468–1549)
  - Alessandro Farnese, Cardinal (1520–1589)
  - Giulia Farnese (1474–1524), mistress of Pope Alexander VI and sister of Pope Paul III
  - Pier Luigi Farnese, Duke of Parma (1503–1547)
  - Ottavio Farnese, second Duke of Parma (1524–1586)
  - Ranuccio Farnese, Cardinal (1530–1565)
  - Alessandro Farnese, third Duke of Parma (1545–1592)
  - Ranuccio I Farnese, fourth Duke of Parma (1569–1622)
  - Odoardo Farnese, fifth Duke of Parma (1612–1646)
  - Ranuccio II Farnese, sixth Duke of Parma (1630–1694)
  - Francesco Farnese, seventh Duke of Parma (1678–1727)
  - Antonio Farnese, eighth Duke of Parma (1679–1731)
  - Elizabeth Farnese, Queen of Spain, wife of King Philip V, mother of Charles III (1692–1766)
- Larry Farnese (born 1968), American politician from Pennsylvania

== Places ==
- Farnese, Lazio, comune (municipality) in the Province of Viterbo in the Italian region Lazio

== Art ==
- Farnese Bull, massive ancient Hellenistic sculpture, formerly in the Farnese collection in Rome
- Farnese Cup, 2nd-century BC cameo cup of Hellenistic Egypt
- Farnese Hercules, ancient sculpture, formerly in the Farnese collection in Rome

== Buildings ==
Various palazzi and villae built by the Farnese family:

- Palazzo Farnese, prominent High Renaissance palace in Rome, which currently houses the French embassy
- Villa Farnesina, suburban villa in the Via della Lungara, in the Rome district of Trastevere
- Villa Caprarola, villa in the province of Viterbo
- Palazzo Farnese, Piacenza, on the banks of River Ro, residence of the Duke of Piacenza

== Other uses ==
- Farnese Vini-Neri Sottoli, Italian road bicycle racing team
