= Ranuccio Farnese the Elder =

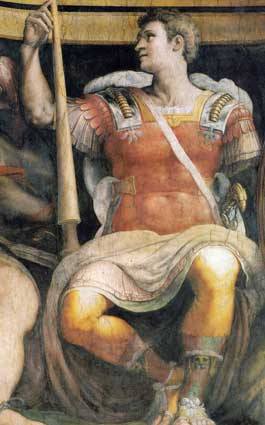
Ranuccio Farnese il Vecchio

Ranuccio Farnese, called the Elder or il Vecchio (c. 1390 – shortly aft. 2 July 1450), Lord of Farnese, etc., was an Italian nobleman, feudal lord and condottiero.

== Life ==
Born in Ischia, son of Pietro Farnese, Lord of Montalto, Latera, Farnese, Valentano, Ischia and Cellere, Captain of the Bolognese Army in 1400 and General Captain of the Army of the Republic of Siena in 1408, who died in 1415, nephew of Pietro Farnese, and wife Pentesilea Dolci, he is considered the founder of the fortunes of the Farnese family. In 1416 Ranuccio succeeded his father as commander-in-chief of the Republic of Siena's troops, and defeated the Orsini of Pitigliano. In April 1419 Pope Martin V appointed him as Senator of Rome, and three years later he received the fiefs of Tessennano and Piansano in the Papal States.

Also serving as Captain General of the Church under Pope Eugene IV, Ranuccio obtained new lands in rewards of the creadits accumulated towards the Apostolic Chamber. These included Montalto di Castro, Canino, and numerous others in the northern Lazio.

He died in Ischia.

== Marriage and issue ==
He married c. 1420 Agnese Monaldeschi della Cervara, who died aft. 1450, daughter of Angelo Monaldeschi della Cervara, Patrician of Orvieto, and had:

- Gabriele Francesco Farnese (1421/1422 - shortly aft. 1475), Lord of Ischia, Cellere, Canino, Gradoli, Marta, Isola Bisentina, etc., General of the Army of the Republic of Siena in 1450, married in Pitigliano in 1442 Isabella called Lella Orsini, daughter of Aldobrandino Orsini, Count of Pitigliano and Nola, and had:
  - Caterina Farnese (1454/1455 - Perugia, 1502), married in 1480 Sigismondo, Count of Castellottieri, Patrician of Perugia
  - Ranuccio Farnese (1456 - k.a. Fornovo, 6 July 1495), Lord of Canino and Gradoli, Captain of Florentine Army (1482–1495), Captain of Venetian Army in 1495, married in 1475 Ippolita Pallavicino, daughter of Federico Pallavicino, Marquess of Tabiano, and had:
    - Federico Farnese (1480 - 1511), Lord of Canino and Gradoli, married in 1504 Ippolita Sforza (c. 1490 - Canino, 1543), daughter of Federico I Sforza, Count of Santa Fiora, without issue
    - Ranuccio Farnese (- aft. 1512), Captain of the Florentine Army, unmarried and without issue
    - Isabella Farnese (c. 1480 - 1521), married in September 1493 Giulio Orsini, Count of Pitigliano and Sovana
    - Camilla Farnese (1482 - Rome, 1550), married Giacomo Savelli, Lord of Palombara (- Rome, 1541)
  - Paolo Farnese (1458 - Rome, 1490), Apostolic Protonotary
  - Agnese Farnese (Ischia, c. 1460 - Siena, 23 October 1509), married in Siena in 1475 Andrea Todeschini-Piccolomini, Lord of Castiglione della Pescaia and of the Island of the Giglio (Siena, c. 1445 - Siena, December 1505), brother of Pope Pius III and maternal nephew of Pope Pius II
- Angelo Farnese (1432/1433 - 1463), Captain of the Papal Army, married Costanza Malatesta (1430 - c. 1475), daughter of Galeotto Roberto Malatesta, Lord of Rimini, and had:
  - Francesca Farnese (1453 - Santa Fiora, 1505/1506), married Guido Sforza (c. 1445 - 1508), Count of Santa Fiora
- Pier Luigi I Farnese (c. 1435 - November 1487), Lord of Capodimonte, Musignano, Valentano, Gradoli, Piansano, Canino and Abbazia al Ponte, Papal Vicar of Canino in 1466, married in Ischia in March 1464 Giovanna called Giovannella Caetani of the Dukes of Sermoneta, daughter of Onorato III Caetani, Duke of Sermoneta, and had:
  - Angelo Farnese (Canino, January 1465 - Capodimonte, May 1494), Lord of Canino, Montalto, etc., Captain of the Neapolitan Army 1484–1486, Captain of the Florentine Army 1486–1488, married in Valentano on 11 May 1488 Lella Orsini, daughter of Nicola Orsini, Count of Pitigliano and Sovana, and had:
    - Bernardina Farnese (c. 1490 - Mugnano, 1543), married in Rome in 1504 Ulisse Orsini, Marquess of Penna and Lord of Mugnano
    - Laura Farnese (1492 - 1527), married in 1507 Guido, Count of Castellottieri, Patrician of Perugia
  - Girolama Farnese (Canino, 1466 - killed by her stepson Giovanni Battista dell’Anguillara, Stabia Castle, 1 November 1505), married firstly by proxy in Capodimonte on 10 November 1483 Puccio Pucci, Patrician of Florence (Florence, c. 1460 - Rome, 31 August 1494), Ambassador of the Florentine Republic to the Pope, and married secondly in Rome on 15 February 1495 Giuliano Count dell’Anguillara, Lord of Stabia
  - Alessandro Farnese, Pope Paul III
  - Beatrice Farnese (Canino, 1469 - Viterbo, 1507), Benedictine nun in 1480, Abbess of San Bernardino Monastery of Viterbo in 1490
  - Giulia Farnese
- Pietro Farnese, Captain of the Army of the Common of Orvieto, unmarried and without issue
- Caterina Farnese, unmarried and without issue
- Violante Farnese, unmarried and without issue
- Agnese Farnese, married in 1443 Paolo Savelli, Lord of Rignano
- Lucrezia Farnese (c. 1430 - 1487), married c. 1445 Francesco, Count dell’Anguillara, Count of Anguillara Sabazia, Lord of Vetralla, Giove and Viano (c. 1425 - Rome, 1473)
- Eugenia Farnese, married in 1455 Stefano called Stefanello Colonna, Lord of Palestrina, Bassanello, Castelnuovo, Anticoli, Carbognano and Roviano, San Cesareo and Genazzano (posthumous Castelnuovo, May 1433 - 1482/1490/c. 1490), General of the Church, and had issue
- Pentasilea Farnese, married Costantino di Ruggiero Contranieri, Patrician of Perugia
- Francesca Farnese, married Gentile Monaldeschi della Cervara, Count of Castiglione, Patrician of Orvieto
- Giulia Farnese (- Rome, 1511), Franciscan tertiary nun

== Sources ==
- Gamrath, Helge (2007). Farnese: Pomp, Power, and Politics in Renaissance Italy. L'Erma Di Bretschneider.
- Williams, George L. (1998). Papal Genealogy: The Families and Descendants of the Popes. McFarland & Company, Inc.
- del Vecchio, Edoardo (1972). I Farnese. Istituto di Studi Romani Editore.
