= Monastero della Visitazione, Viterbo =

Italian church

Coordinates: 42.41321°N 12.10711°E

The Monastero della Visitazione is a cloistered Cistercian monastic complex, including a monastery and church located on Via San Pietro in central Viterbo, region of Lazio, Italy. The complex is also referred to as the Monastero della Duchessa, due to its history. It stands across from the Istituto magistrale statale Santa Rosa di Viterbo.

== History and description ==
Cistercian nuns arrived in Viterbo in 1276, originally occupying the convent of Santa Maria del Paradiso. However, by the 16th century, under the patronage of Duchess of Parma, Piacenza, and Castro, Gerolama Orsini Farnese, they were relocated to a new monastery of Maria Santissima della Visitazione and thus also called della Duchessa. Gerolama, widow of Pier Luigi Farnese, son of Pope Paul III, after her husband's murder, retired to a villa in the Duchy of Castro, but conceived the idea of creating this monastery. Construction began circa 1553, in the area occupied mainly by the Palazzo del Cardinal Raniero Capocci, and the ancient parish church of San Bartolomeo.

The enterprise was approved by the Pope Paul IV in 1557 the Duchess, through lobbying by her son Cardinal Ranuccio Farnese, with the request that the monastery be endowed by the Dukes of Castro. Cistercian nuns were moved here from Florence in addition to 25 lay sisters from the territory of Castro. A guide from 1743 mentions the monastery housing usually 60 nuns.

The church of the Visitazione was built at the site of the former church of San Bartolomeo; construction took place from 1607 to 1614, when it was finally consecrated by the Bishop Cardinal Tiberio Muti. The construction was delayed until all the properties had been acquired to link the monastery to the church. The church underwent refurbishment and reconsecration in 1729, by Bishop Sermattei. Another refurbishment took place in 1873 by Bishop Luigi Serafini. This complex escaped the national suppression of many monasteries that took place in 1870. A final refurbishment was completed in 2006.

The façade has a sober neoclassical layout with a dedication on a frieze, depicting numerous fleur de lis and roses (symbols of the Farnese and Orsini respectively). The portal is decorated with cherubic faces and an dove, symbol of the holy spirit in the tympanum. Much of the exterior of the monastery is walled, as is typical of cloistered monasteries. Beyond the Baroque bell-tower located near the apse are walled in mullioned windows belonging to a former Palazzo belonging to the Capocci family.

The monastery is inaccessible to the public. On nave ceiling is a canvas depicting the Trinity with Saints Bernard and Benedict (18th-century) by Anton Angelo Falaschi. This painter also decorated other portions of the monastery. The first altarpiece on the right depicts the Martyrdom of St Bartholomew (1774) by Annunziata Verchiani and a copy of a work by Guercino. The second altarpiece on the right depicts a Madonna and Child with Saints Benedict and Bernard (18th-century) by AA Falaschi. In the third altar on the right is a bust meant to depict the head of the martyred St Crescenziano, holding his relics, and gifted to this church by Pope Gregory XVI in 1833.

One of the chapels in the presbytery is dedicated to Donna Maria Benedetta Frey, who died in 1913 after 52 years of illness accepted with serene resignation. In part, she was one reason why the monastery had not been suppressed in 1870. In 1960 her body was exhumed and putatively found incorrupt; this, putative miracles attributed to her intercession, and her life of holiness have prompted a review as to whether to beatify her. On 30 September 2015, Pope Francis proclaimed her venerable. The altar a wax statuette of the baby Jesus, to which Sister Maria Benedetta was particularly devoted. Along the square apse, are grates allowing the cloistered nuns to attend service. Above the main altar is a 17th-century crucifix; the main altarpiece had once been the Visitation by Filippo Caparozzi, now presumably in the Museo Civico. On the wall are the coat of arms of the Farnese and Orsini families.
