= War of Parma =

Habsburg-Valois conflict in the Duchy of Parma

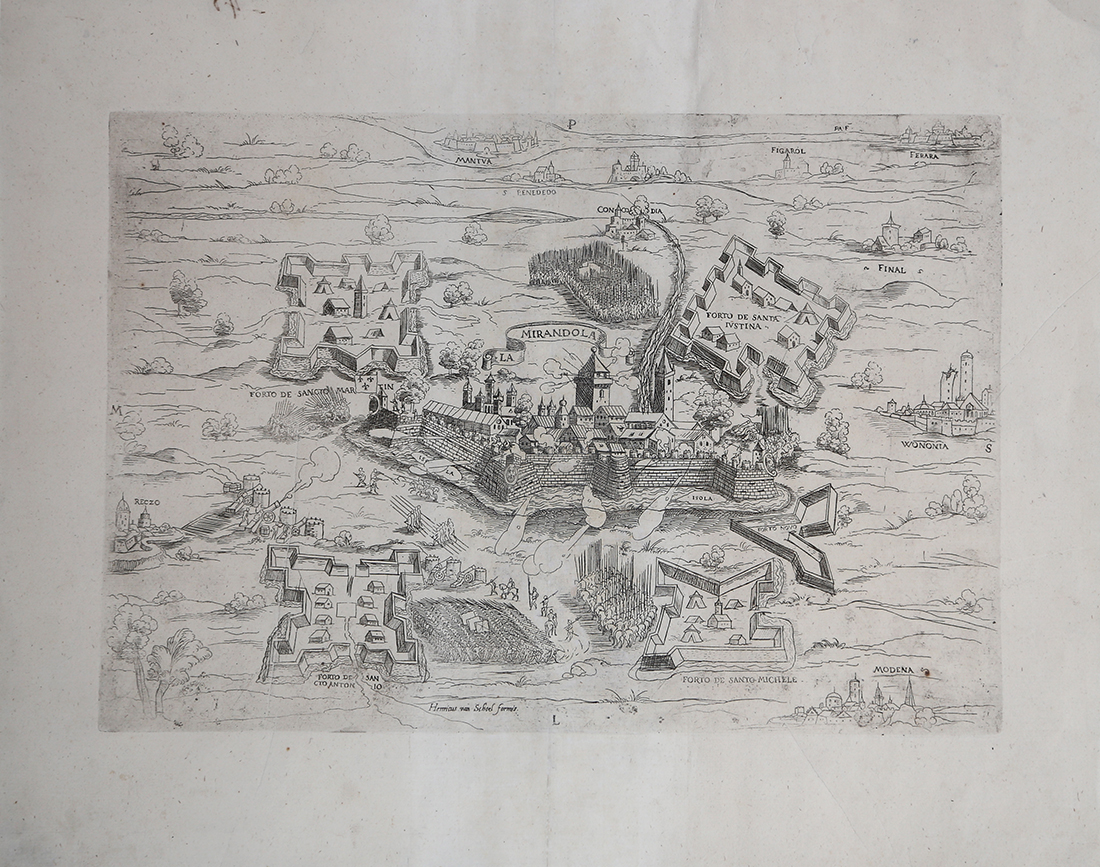
The siege of Mirandola in 1551

The War of Parma was a short war from June 1551 to 29 April 1552 between an alliance of Charles V, Holy Roman Emperor and the Papal States on one side and the Kingdom of France and the Duchy of Parma on the other. It was part of the Italian War of 1551–59.

== Course ==
After the assassination of Pier Luigi Farnese, Duke of Parma, son of Pope Paul III, the papal states wished to regain the duchy he had set up. Pier Luigi's son Ottavio Farnese was Charles V's son-in-law and took possession of the duchy despite Paul III and Julius III's opposition. Ottavio approached Henry II of France, who had his own reasons to oppose the papal claim to the duchy. Shortly after negotiations opened, Julius III and Charles V began a war against Parma. The House of Farnese also left its alliance with the pope and the Holy Roman Empire to ally itself with Parma and France.

Ferrante Gonzaga, Governor of the Duchy of Milan, occupied Brescello and prepared for the siege of Parma. Despite assistance from French troops, Orazio Farnese, Ottavio's brother and the Duke of Castro, was beaten at Crevalcore, near Mirandola. Henry II also ordered Charles de Cossé, Count of Brissac to invade Piedmont, forcing Gonzaga to lessen his pressure on the duchy of Parma in September 1551, making it bear the main burden of the war. In 1551 Julius sent his nephew Gian Battista Del Monte to besiege Mirandola, then held by a small French force under Piero Strozzi. The siege ended on Good Friday 1552 with Del Monte's death.

Julius had opened negotiations with France on 9 September 1551 by sending Girolamo Verallo as his legate to Henry. After the failure at Mirandola, these were re-opened, before breaking down due to France's excessive claims. When the pope discovered that Charles was in major difficulties, negotiations resumed again and on 29 April 1552 an accord was sealed. This mandated a two year truce, allowing Ottavio to make a peace treaty with the pope and restoring the duchy of Castro to the Farnese. Charles took eleven days to ratify the accord, which he did on 10 May.

== Bibliography ==
- (in French) P. Courteault, Blaise de Monluc Historien, 1908, p 190,
- (in Italian) A. Ceruti, Compendio storico, 1877, page 106-113
- (in Italian) Balan, Gli assedi della Mirandola di papa Giulio III nel 1551 e 1152, narrati secondo i più recenti document, 1876
- (in Italian) De Leva, La guerra di papa Giulio III contro Ottavio Farnese sino al principio delle negoziazioni di pace con la Francia, 1884
- (in Italian) Papa Giulio III e la guerra di Parma e della Mirandola secondo il carteggio di Ippolito Capilupi con Ferrante Gonzaga, 1893, p 215-230
- Rosselli, Donatella (1995). "Farnese, Horace". Biographical Dictionary of Italians - Volume 45. Institute of the Italian Encyclopedia.
