= Rocca di Ischia di Castro =

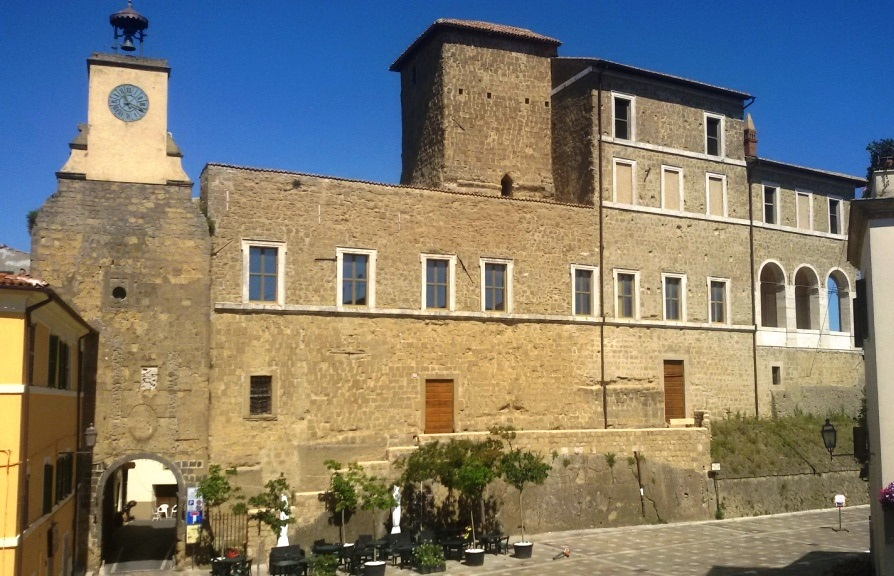
- Interactive map of the Rocca di Ischia di Castro area

General information
- Location: Ischia di Castro, Lazio, Piazza Eraclio Stendardi, Italy
- Year built: XI - XIV century

The "Rocca of Ischia di Castro" is the most conspicuous monument in the Italian village of Ischia di Castro, a medieval castle called by locals "La Rocca" or "La Rocca Farnese". It was one of the oldest residences of the Farnese family.

== (Re)construction ==
Its structure shows the different stages recognizable from its current configuration. Built directly on the tuff rock, its original structure dates back to the 11th century. Initially featuring three towers, a drawbridge, and a moat, it is further fortified in the fourteenth century. It underwent significant modifications during the Renaissance reconstruction, attributed to Antonio da Sangallo the Younger, architect of the Farnese family, who changed the castle into a palace, although the modifications were only partially completed.
Of the three towers, the south-eastern, in medieval times defending the drawbridge, then transformed into a gateway to the historic center, was probably raised in the eighteenth century, to install the clock. The center tower was filled to support the thrust of the new construction, the right wing of a Renaissance palace. The third, which is access to the building, is docked.
The restructuring resulted in a transformation of Sangallo typological and aesthetic of severe medieval building, giving the primitive structure the new look of palace, characterized by an airy loggia structure of travertine, then it also buffered, but remains a significant example of residence civilian families most of the time.

After the end of the Duchy of Castro in 1649, the palace passed to the Papal Apostolic Camera, then to the Roman Capranica family, and later to the Piermartini family. The current owner is Stefano Aluffi Pentini.

In 2008, the castle was in a state of considerable disrepair. The start of the restoration was accelerated by the collapse of a portion of the surrounding wall, which blocked access to the town's historic center. The restoration lasted approximately for two years and involved re-roofing, consolidating the walls, and restoring the four facades.
