= Pietro Farnese =

Italian condottiero

Pietro Farnese, also called Piero de Farneto or Petruccio di Cola (c. 1310 – 20 June 1363) was an Italian condottiero. He was co-lord of Farnese, Canino, Ischia and Cellere, Captain General of the Papal Army and Captain General of the Florentine Army.

== Biography ==
Little is known of his youth. In 1338, at Orvieto, together with his father Nicola, he sided with the Monaldeschi della Vipera against the Monaldeschi della Cervara and was declared a rebel. In 1345 he returned to Orvieto and was appointed as commander of the communal army, commanding 5,000 men at the siege of Castiglion Fiorentino. In February 1352 he was able to reconquer Orvieto, which had surrendered to Perugia, but was pushed back by Pepo Monaldeschi del Cane.

In 1354 he entered the service of cardinal Gil de Albornoz at Milan, to fight against the Ghibelline leader Bernabò Visconti. In November of the following year he became Captain General of the Papal Army, receiving half the fief of Onano in the Marche. In 1359, always for Albornoz, he directed the military operations against Forlì and Forlimpopoli, which were stormed in July. The following year Giovanni Visconti da Oleggio, lord of Bologna, declared war on Bernabò Visconti, but was forced to ask (in exchange for the lordship over his city) the help of Albornoz, who sent Pietro Farnese to take possession of it.

In 1361 he recovered Lugo, Bagnacavallo and Solarolo, but in June he had to return to the defence of Bologna, menaced by Visconti. The latter was defeated the following month. In 1362 he was appointed as Commander of the Florentine Army in the war against Pisa. Farnese obtained a decisive victory, for which he was rewarded with a monument executed by Orcagna, still visible in Florence Cathedral. In 1363 he fell ill with the plague and died at Castelfiorentino.

== See also ==
- House of Farnese

== Sources ==
- Gwynne, Paul G.; Owens, Patrick M., eds. (2025). Lorenzo Gambara's Caprarola and On Poetic Composition: Text, Translation and Commentary. Brill. ISBN 9789004126671.
