= Ranuccio Farnese =

Ranuccio Farnese may refer to:

- Ranuccio Farnese il Vecchio (1390–1450), grandfather of Pope Paul III
- Ranuccio Farnese (1509–1529), son of Pope Paul III
- Ranuccio Farnese (cardinal) (1530–1565), grandson of Pope Paul III
- Ranuccio I Farnese, Duke of Parma, fourth Duke of Parma and Piacenza (1569–1622)
- Ranuccio II Farnese, Duke of Parma, sixth Duke of Parma and Piacenza (1630–1694)
