= Portrait of Ranuccio Farnese =

Painting by Titian

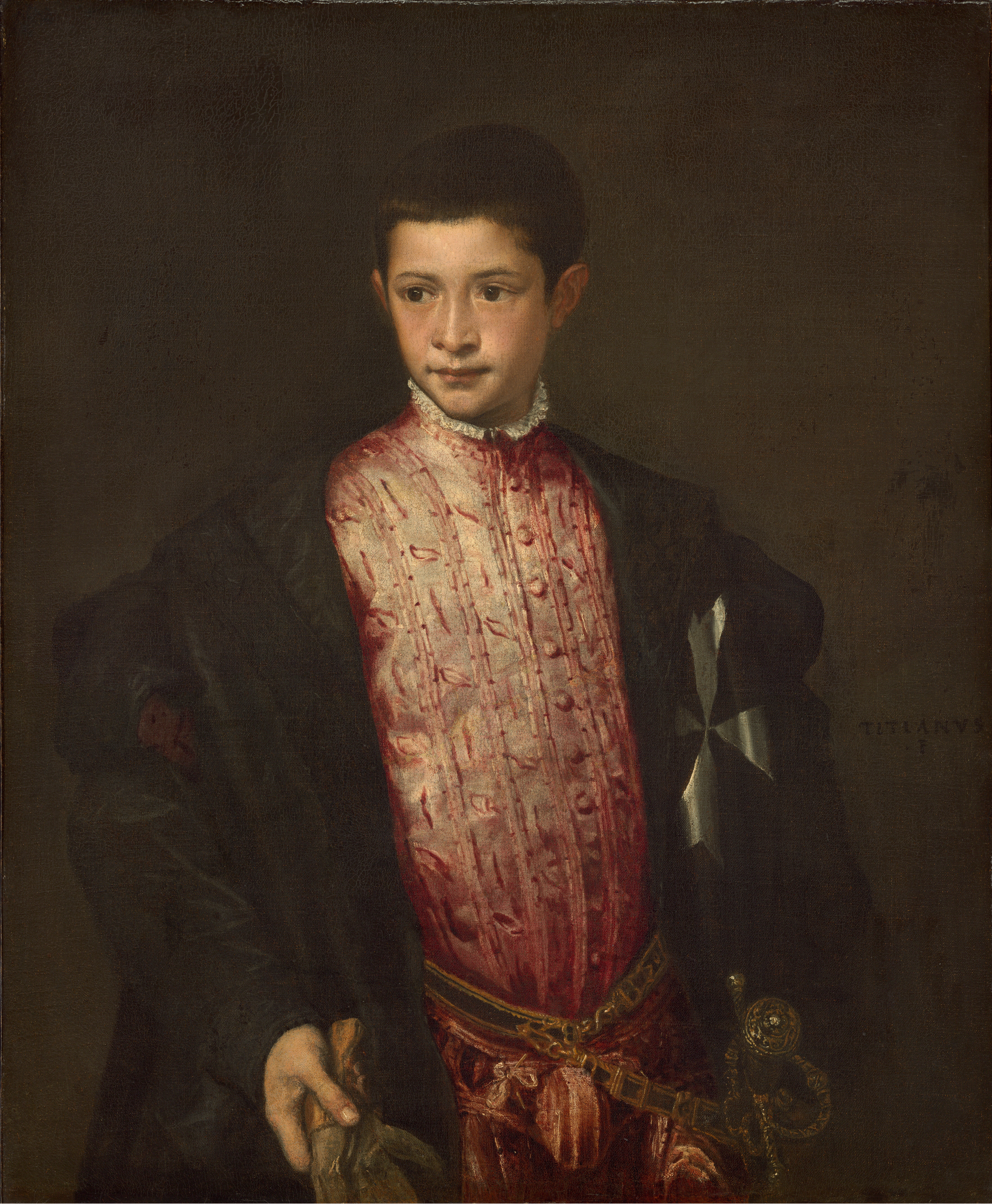
Portrait of Ranuccio Farnese (c. 1542) by Titian

Portrait of Ranuccio Farnese is an oil on canvas painting of Ranuccio Farnese by Titian, from c. 1542. It is held in the National Gallery of Art, in Washington, D.C. One of the first portraits of a Farnese by the artist, it is signed "Titianvs F.".

== History ==
Its subject was fourth son of Pier Luigi Farnese, Duke of Parma and commander of the papal armies. It shows him aged 12 and - as related in a letter by his elder brother Alessandro Farnese the Younger - was produced while Ranuccio was in Parma. It was commissioned by bishop Cornaro to give to Ranuccio's mother Gerolama Orsini. Initially in the Farnese Collection in Rome and Parma, it was then in the Bourbon collection in Naples from 1734 until just after 1816. It was then brought to London by Sir George Donaldson and sold to John Charles Robinson in 1880 then to Francis Cook sometime before 1885. It was finally bought in 1947 by Gualtiero Volterra for Count Alessandro Contini Bonacossi of Florence, who sold it on to Samuel Henry Kress in 1948, from whose foundation it passed to its present owner in 1952.

== See also ==
- List of works by Titian

== Bibliography ==
- (in Italian) Francesco Valcanover, L'opera completa di Tiziano, Rizzoli, Milano 1969.
- (in Italian) Cecilia Gibellini, Tiziano, collana I Classici dell'arte, Rizzoli, Milano 2003.
