= Battle of Mongiovino =

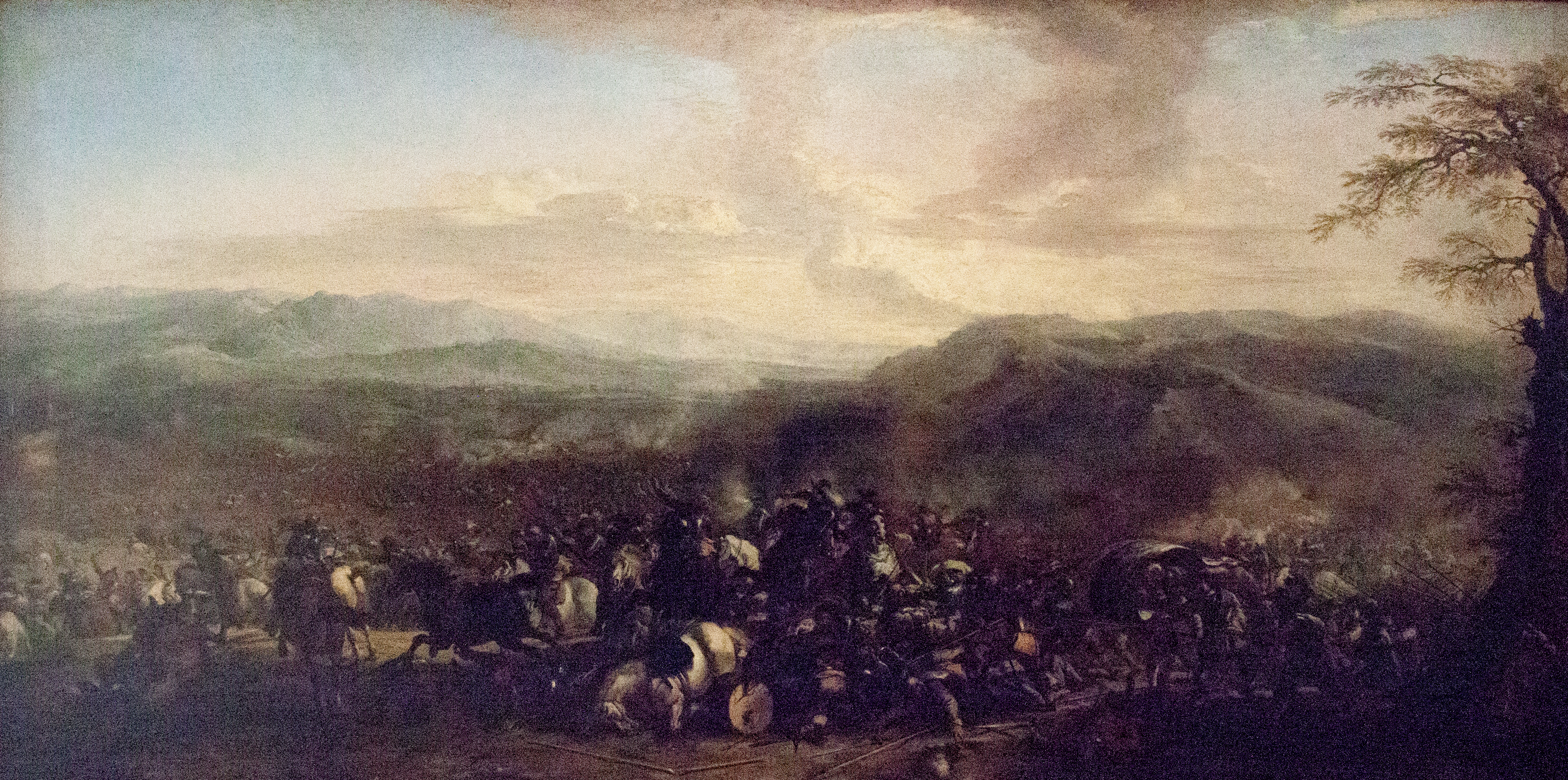
The Battle of Mongiovino by Jacques Courtois

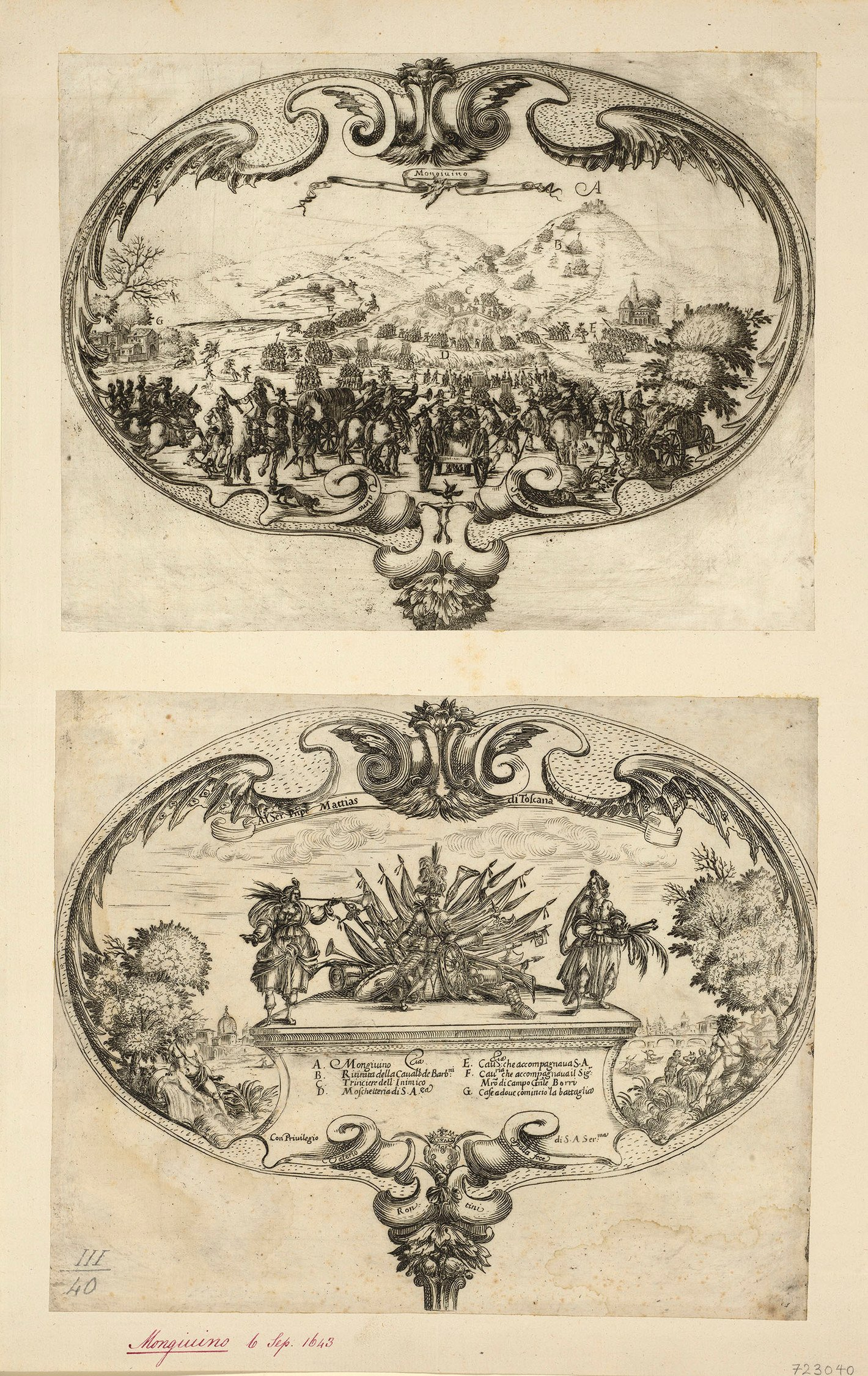
A view of the Battle of Mongiovino by Valerio Spada

The Battle of Mongiovino was a military engagement of the First War of Castro fought on 6 September 1643 between the Papal forces, commanded by Taddeo Barberini (nephew of Pope Urban VIII), and the forces of the Grand Duchy of Tuscany, led by Mattias de' Medici, brother of Ferdinando II of Tuscany.

The battle took place near the village of Mongiovino, in the municipality of Panicale, approximately 38 kilometres (24 mi) from Perugia.

The people of Panicale, caught by surprise, allowed the Tuscan forces to enter their fortified town in an attempt to avoid worse outcomes, following advice from local notables.

== The Battle ==
The battle began with the Tuscan forces under Prince Mattias attacking the Papal troops. The Papal forces, initially holding their ground, were eventually flanked by 1,200 infantry divided into four squadrons of 490 soldiers each, commanded by Prince Mattias and Marchese Dal Borro.

The Papal forces, stationed in Corciano, did not mobilize to support the battle at Mongiovino, contributing to the Papal defeat and forcing their retreat.

== Aftermath ==
The battle resulted in significant losses for the Papal forces.

After the victory at Mongiovino, the Tuscan forces indulged in looting and devastation across nearby castles. However, the town of Mongiovino was spared, thanks to its sanctuary, which the Tuscan soldiers refrained from desecrating, leaving behind a donation for masses.

Following the battle, the commanding officer of the Tuscan forces was promoted to General Sergeant for his merits in the war, a recognition of his success at Mongiovino. The Holy See, however, initiated a process against the commander for leading Tuscan troops into Papal territory and fighting against the Pope's forces.
