= Pope Paul III with a Nephew =

Painting by Sebastiano del Piombo

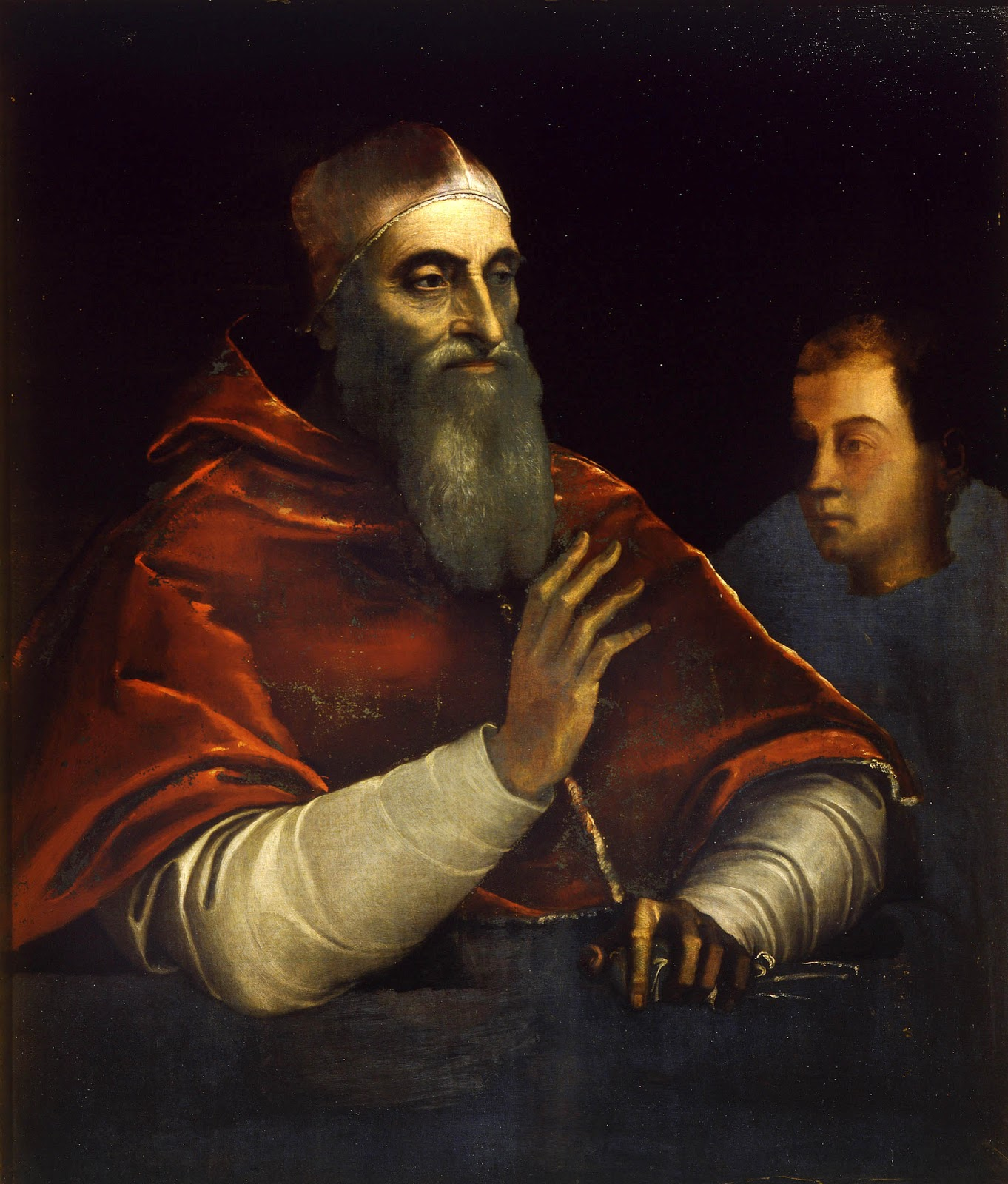
Pope Paul III with a Nephew (1534) by Sebastiano del Piombo

Pope Paul III with a Nephew is an unfinished 1534 oil on slate portrait by Sebastiano del Piombo, now in the Galleria nazionale di Parma. The nephew's identity is unclear but the painting's presumed date suggests it may be Ottavio Farnese, whom Pope Paul III made Duke of Parma and Piacenza soon after the work's date

== Description ==
The work shows clear elements of an unfinished painting. Large areas of the bottom were left at the level of preparation and barely sketched. The slab does not appear perfectly smooth, but wavy, probably following some experimentation that the artist was trying to introduce in his painting. In the foreground, both the young man's habit and the pope's right hand and beard are clearly unfinished. The light that glides softly on the features of the pontiff highlights his physiognomic traits attributable to those of Paul III, especially in the design of the nose and cheekbones, while under the barely sketched beard can be seen the gaunt cheeks, a typical feature of many of his portraits made by Titian.

The identity of the young man, on the other hand, is uncertain, given that the title of "Duke of Castro" was conferred on several grandchildren, but, due to the presumable dating of the painting, its possibly Ottavio Farnese, which would be made then Duke of Parma and Piacenza. During a restoration it was possible to observe the plate with a reflectographic camera and in correspondence with the face of the grandson, a second version of the same head appeared slightly higher, completed in physiognomic characters.

== History ==
The painting, made on a thin slate plate, belonged to the Farnese family, as can be seen from the seal and the inventory number on the back. Mentioned in Rome in 1600 among the assets of the librarian Fulvio Orsini, it arrived in Parma in the mid 1600s. For many years it was thought that the portrait depicted Clement VII together with a young man. It was, however, an inaccurate identification and arisen due to certain similarities with the known effigies of that pope. The identification now, however, seems to be resolved: according to the scholars Ramsden and Lucco, it would be the portrait of Paul III Farnese with a nephew. The attribution would also find the reliability of what Giorgio Vasari wrote in his work Lives of the Most Excellent Painters, Sculptors, and Architects. Vasari mentioned, in the life of Sebastiano del Piombo, a portrait of Pope Paul III, which wasn't finished.

== Sources ==
- (in Italian) Mariangela Giusto, Scheda dell'opera; in Lucia Fornari Schianchi (a cura di) Galleria Nazionale di Parma. Catalogo delle opere, il Seicento, Milano, 1999
