= Mugnano =

Mugnano may refer to several places in Italy:

- Mugnano (Perugia), a frazione of Perugia, Umbria
- Mugnano del Cardinale, a town and comune of the Province of Avellino, Campania
- Mugnano di Napoli, a comune in the Metropolitan City of Naples, Campania
  - Mugnano station, an underground metro station
- Mugnano in Teverina, a former Duchy of the Pontifical States, now a hamlet in the municipality of Bomarzo, Viterbo

== See also ==
- Muñano, a locality in La Poma Department, Salta Province, Argentina
- Abra Muñano, a locality in Rosario de Lerma Department, Salta Province, Argentina
