= Istituto magistrale statale Santa Rosa di Viterbo =

Coordinates: 42.4131°N 12.1069°E

The Istituto magistrale statale Santa Rosa di Viterbo is a high school focused on training teachers with specialties in human sciences, music, and dance, with main campus located on Via San Pietro # 27 in central Viterbo, region of Lazio, Italy. It stands across from the Monastero della Visitazione.

The palatial building now site of the main campus of this Liceo classico was once the residence of the aristocratic Degli Atti family. In 1822, it belonged to the Collegio di Propaganda Fide and was given in emphyteusis to be converted into a female orphanage (orfanotropio), named a Scuola di Divina Provvidenza (School of Divine Providence) under the patronage of Cardinal Severoli and with the support of Giovanni Polidori, Stefano Gaspadori, and Luigi Falcinelli.

A brief history of the school recounts that in 1927, the main secular secondary schools in Viterbo, now a provincial capital, were the Liceo ginnasio Umberto I and the Regio Istituto tecnico Paolo Savi. In order to foster a school for teachers, in 1932 the Comune and national government agreed on such a program with first classes starting 1934. In 1985 a socio-psycho-pedagogical high school and a linguistic high school were trialed. In 1997 a formal Liceo of the Social Science was started.
