= Valerio Spada =

Italian printmaker (1613–1688)

Valerio Spada (1613–1688) was an Italian printmaker.

== Life and work ==
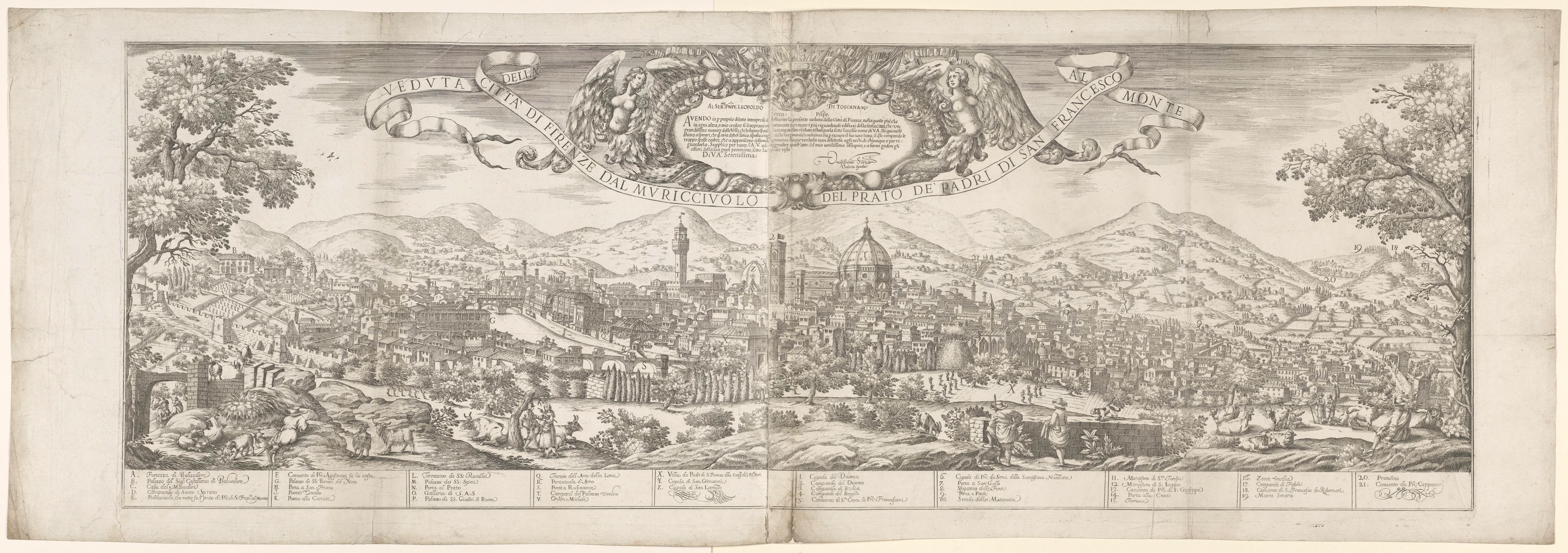
Valerio Spada, View of the city of Florence from the walls of the lawn of the fathers of S.Francesco al Monte, circa 1650 (Rijksmuseum).

Spada was born in Colle di Val d'Elsa, Tuscany. He Studied drawing with Lorenzo Lippi.

He was a draughtsman, etcher and calligrapher, and also worked as a public scrivener and teacher of calligraphy.

== Collections ==
Spada's work is held in the following permanent collections:

- Art Institute of Chicago, Chicago, Illinois
- British Museum, London
- Metropolitan Museum of Art, New York
- Harvard Art Museums, Harvard University, Cambridge, Massachusetts
- Rijksmuseum, Amsterdam
- Victoria and Albert Museum, London (as designer, and as engraver)
- National Gallery of Art, Washington, D.C.
