= Gerolama Orsini =

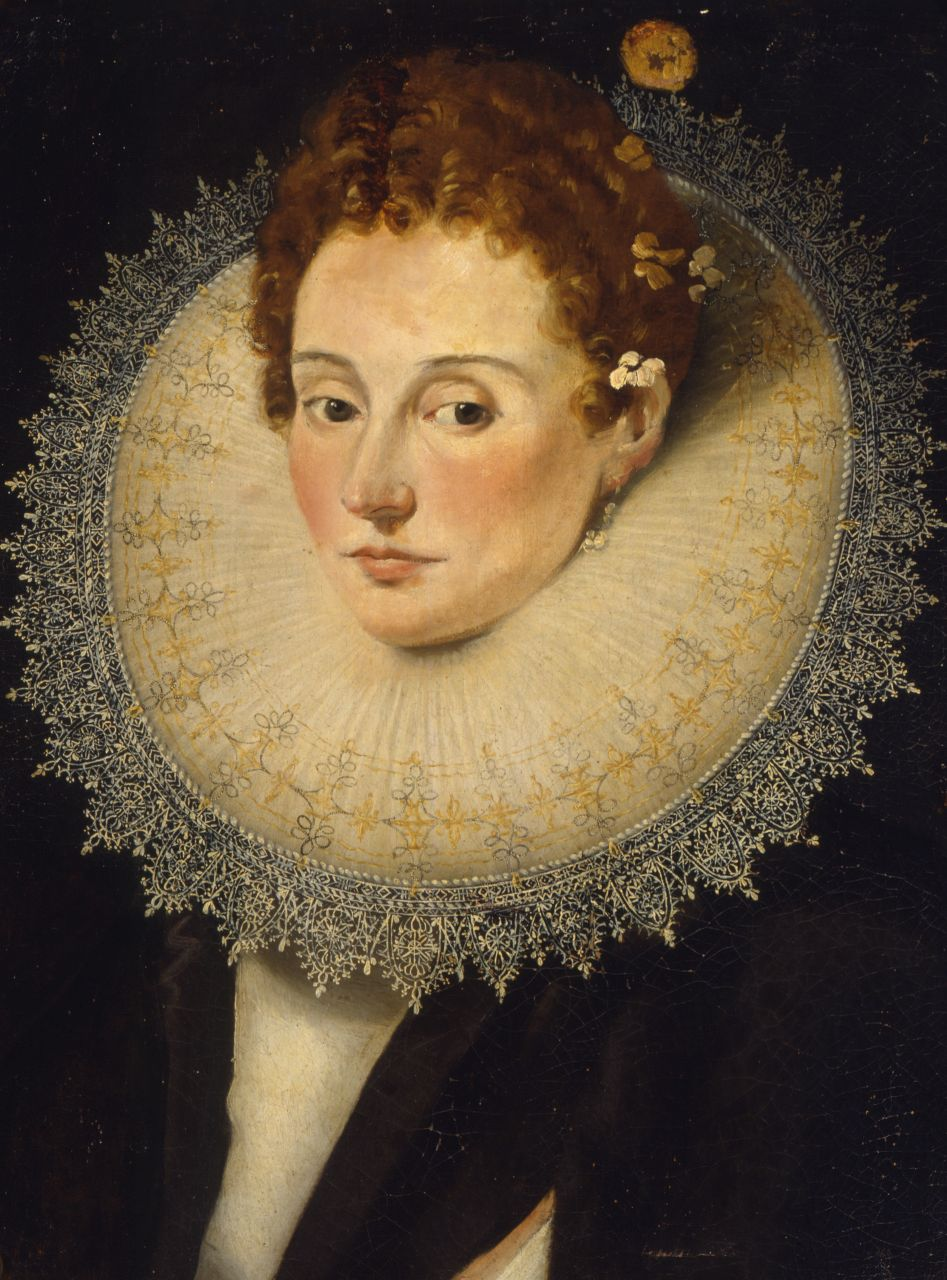

Duchess consort of Parma and Piacenza
- Tenure: 19 August 1545 – 10 September 1547
- Born: 1504; Pitigliano, Papal States
- Died: 1569 (aged 64–65); Palazzo Farnese, Duchy of Parma and Piacenza
- Spouse: Pier Luigi Farnese
- Issue Detail: Cardinal Alessandro; Vittoria, Duchess of Urbino; Ottavio, Duke of Parma; Orazio, Duke of Castro; Cardinal Ranuccio
- House: Orsini
- Father: Ludovico Orsini, Count of Pitigliano
- Mother: Giulia Conti

Gerolama Orsini (1504–1569) sometimes Girolama Orsini was the Duchess of Parma as the wife of Pier Luigi Farnese, Duke of Parma. She served as Regent (Governor) of the Duchy of Castro in the name of her son Orazio, Duke of Castro between 1550 and 1553.

== Biography ==
Born in Pitigliano, she was the daughter of Ludovico Orsini, Count of Pitigliano, and Giulia Conti. In 1513, an engagement contract between Orsini and Pier Luigi Farnese was drawn up, and in 1519 the wedding was celebrated at Valentano. Her husband was the illegitimate son of Pope Paul III and Silvia Ruffino. The couple had five children, three of whom would have further progeny.

When Cardinal Alessandro Farnese became Pope Paul III in 1534, he made his son Pier Luigi captain-general of the Church, in 1537, Duke of Castro, and finally in 1545, Duke of Parma and Piacenza. Gerolama remained in Rome and maintained the family presence at the court of the Pope. She was described as a sensible person capable of making important decisions when necessary, close to the Pope and the interests of her sons. She lived a retired life, but was always actively engaged in maintaining the political interest of her sons.

She was widowed in 1547 and remained in Rome. When Pope Paul III died in 1549, Gerolama unsuccessfully attempted to work for the candidacy of a Pope beneficial to the Farnese family. In 1550, Gerolama was appointed the regent-governor of the Duchy of Castro in the absence of her son. Castro was occupied by Papal troops the same year. Gerolama maintained her regency by not resisting, and yet continuing to exert her authority while working for the end of the Papal occupation, and finally managed to achieve the end of the Papal occupation in 1552. Her regency ended when she was informed of the death of her son Orazio in 1553, and she departed for Parma, where she settled for the rest of her life.

She died at the Palazzo Farnese Piacenza, July 1569. She was buried at the Farnese crypt at the Sanctuary of Santa Maria della Steccata, Parma.

== Issue ==
1. Vittoria Farnese (10 August 1519 – 13 December 1602) married Guidobaldo della Rovere, Duke of Urbino and had issue.
2. Alessandro Farnese (5 October 1520 – 2 March 1589) never married.
3. Ottavio Farnese, Duke of Parma (9 October 1524 – 18 September 1586) married Margaret of Parma and had issue.
4. Ranuccio Farnese (11 August 1530 – 1565) died unmarried.
5. Orazio Farnese, Duke of Castro (1532 – 18 July 1553) married Diane de France no issue.
