= Ischia di Castro =

- Comune
- Comune di Ischia di Castro
- Coat of arms

- Location within Italy Location within Lazio
- Coordinates: 42°32′N 11°45′E
- Country: Italy
- Region: Lazio
- Province: Viterbo (VT)

Government
  - Mayor: Salvatore Serra

Area
  - Total: 104.9 km^{2} (40.5 sq mi)
- Elevation: 384 m (1,260 ft)

Population (2008)
  - Total: 2,444
  - Density: 23.30/km^{2} (60.34/sq mi)
- Demonym: Ischiani
- Time zone: UTC+1 (CET)
  - Summer (DST): UTC+2 (CEST)
- Postal code: 01010
- Dialing code: 0761

Ischia di Castro is a comune (municipality) in the Province of Viterbo in the Italian region of Latium, located about 90 kilometres (56 mi) northwest of Rome and about 30 kilometres (19 mi) northwest of Viterbo.

Ischia di Castro borders the following municipalities: Canino, Cellere, Farnese, Manciano, Pitigliano, Valentano.

It takes its name from the nearby Castro, a town destroyed by Papal forces in the 17th century.

== Main sights ==
The town is home to the Ducal Palace, or Rocca, to whose project collaborated Antonio da Sangallo the Younger (also designer's of Castro's walls before its destruction). It was once a palace of the Farnese family.
