= Mugnano in Teverina =

Hamlet in Bomarzo, Province of Viterbo, Lazio, Italy

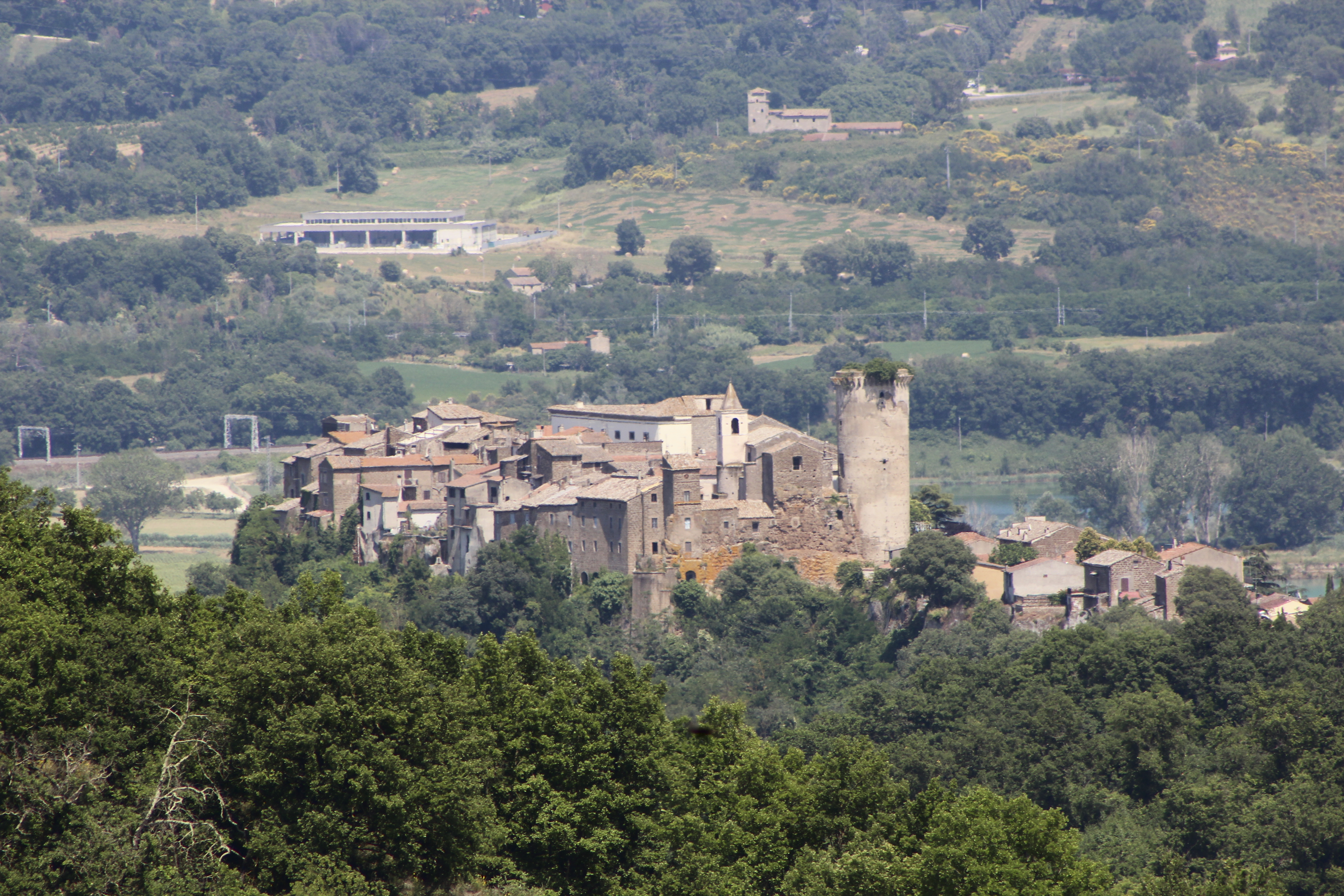
View of Mugnano Landscape

Mugnano in Teverina (literally Mugnano of the Tiber, or near the Tiber), a former Duchy of the Pontifical States, has been a hamlet in the Italian municipality of Bomarzo, in the province of Viterbo, since the 1890s.

== Physical geography and demography ==
Located on a spur of volcanic tuff (of the type known as "Civita Castellana" also called "Etruscan") bathed by the waters of the Tiber, this small inhabited area rises to 133 metres above sea level and is inhabited by about 200 people, including seasonal residents. The hamlet has about 100 inhabitants in the sense of the municipal population of permanent residents. The majority of the population is over sixty years of age1.

== Toponymy ==
According to the 19th century priest and archaeologist Luigi Vittori, the name comes from the ancient city of Meonia, founded near Bomarzo by the Meonis people fleeing Asia Minor2. Even today, near the village, there is a place known as Pianmiano, which according to popular etymology is derived from an original Planum Meonianum. These ideas are now abandoned; rather, Mugnano is derived from "Munii Gen"s, i.e. this locality would have belonged to a certain Munii people.

== History ==
An Etruscan necropolis used until the late Etrustcan period, Mugnano preserves at least ten Etruscan tombs. It later became inhabited as a Roman castrum (fort) along the Via Cassia that linked Rome to Florence. There is still a fragment of this road inside the ducal palace.

Mugnano is located on the border between Lazio and Umbria, i.e. on the borders of the Heritage of Saint Peter, which forms the original nucleus of the Pontifical States. Mugnano may have been attached in 741, at the same time as Polymartium (Bomarzo).

The first precise information about the village dates back to the Middle Ages. The first known lords of the castrum were the Mugnani, an important Guelph family from Orvieto 3, but around the middle of the 13th century the castle passed into the hands of the Orsini family of condottiere (mercenaries). The cylindrical tower of Gothic architecture probably dates from this period.

In 1417, after Pope Martin V Colonna's election to the papal throne, the duchy (which may refer to a very small regionin Italy, since they indicate a noble rank and, in principle, maximum autonomy from the Prince) became the property first of Antonio Colonna, then of the Farnese family. At this time that the walls surrounding the castle were completely demolished during a short siege as part of the Pope's campaign to impose themselves against the Orsini, rivals of their family. In 1432, the Orsini family took possession of the city, later redeveloping the existing palace under the leadership of Charles Orsini 1. In 1587, the Apostolic Chamber, taking advantage of the extinction of the direct branch of the Orsini, seized the fiefdom, which did not return to the family's hands until 1707 4. Since the plebiscite of 2 October 1870, it has been part of the Kingdom (later the Republic) of Italy.

== Tangible Heritage ==
In the surroundings of Mugnano two ovens were active between the 1st and 4th centuries AD, they belonged to a factory of bricks and other materials, taking advantage of the river for the manufacture and transport of products. From the two production plants come about 200 seals of the manufacturer, which marks his production. The analysis of these marks, found for example in the monuments of ancient Rome, shows that, for the first 150 years of their history, the ovens belonged to the powerful senatorial family Domitii, and then, by succession, between 155 and 161 AD to the future Marcus Aurelius, descendant of the Domitii on the side of the mother Domitia Lucilla Minor. In addition to the manufacture of building materials, the furnaces were specialized in the production of two different types of containers that were found in situ:

-Dolium, used for the transport and storage of agricultural and food products, and - mortars: Dolia and mortars bearing the name Domitii are exported throughout the Mediterranean basin and Scotland, mainly to Gaul, Hispania and North Africa via land and sea routes. Following the Tiber, the products of the ovens, stacked on boats and barges, reached Rome, and from there to the borders of the Empire.

The Church of Saints Vincent and Liberato, the Parish headquarters, its bell tower, circular at its square base at its top, it is built on one of the two guard towers of the medieval gate (or ancient tardo) of the castrum (Porta Antica). The late Baroque style dominates, including medium quality trompe l'oeil and well-made painted marble-like marbles. In addition to a reliquary of San Liberato, it houses relics of four popes. It is the headquarters of the only brotherhood of Mugnano dedicated to Saint Liberato which, in addition to its social and material assistance role, is in charge of processions on solemn days. Her red clothes with blue houppelande are decorated with a large golden medallion of the saint's figure.

The church of Saint Lucia, located on the main square with its square bell tower in volcanic tuff, it also has a central bell tower painted above the apse and some frescos not restored. The building was consecrated to him and remains consecrated.

The church of Saint Roch, deconsecrated, it is not maintained by the parish but remains diocesan property. Despite its slow deterioration, it houses a 17th-century fresco. It is pierced with almond-shaped windows typical of the period. Its sale was refused or did not succeed in 1998.

The church of the cemetery, destroyed by a tornado in the late 1990s, included medieval frescoes.

The Grand Palais Ducal's main building dates from the 14th century but includes at least one tower from the 12th century, however its present appearance is due to the action of the Duke of Mugnano Carlo Orsini in the early 16th century. He had the loggia built, perhaps by the Peruzzi workshop, surmounted at least until the 18th century by a triangular pediment reminiscent of an ancient temple, as shown by the frescos of the Ducal Palace of Bomarzo. A former tobacco factory from the 19th to the first half of the 20th century, the building, now transformed into a guest room, underwent a complete restoration in 2010.5

The Gothic Dungeon of Mugnano, a high cylindrical tower was built by the Orsini in the 13th or 14th century overlooks a Roman cistern. It is characterized by murderers for flank fire, a Gothic trilobal window for observation and a crowning strip. It controls the medieval or ancient tardo access to the village.6

Fountains, dating from the modern or contemporary era, they are carved in yellow (see above) or grey (Peperin) volcanic tuff.

== Intangible heritage and traditions ==
The Alzamaggio is an annual festival; every year, on April 30, the village comes alive with festivities moved in honour of the patron saint Saint Liberato Martyr. Everything starts on the 30th, the streets of the village are decorated with the sound of bells in the morning. From 4 p.m. onwards, the rite begins, which leads to the traditional elevation of a high poplar tree in the colours of the brotherhood, previously blessed at the end of the Mass which concludes the triduum (3 masses over three days) in honour of the saint. The elevation of the tree, chosen for its height and finesse, is an ancient festival, of pagan origin, which celebrates the propitiatory rite of fertility and the rebirth of the earth. The committee's men met at 16:00 in the village gardens, then reached the meanders of the Tiber in search of the most beautiful poplar tree that would be carried on the shoulders in the country. The most exciting part is related to the elevation and transplantation of the tree, which is done only by hand, without pulleys, using ropes and ladders in a fairly small space in front of the loggia of the ducal palace. This tree, deeply buried to resist the winds, was not replaced until the following year. He measured, from human memory, up to 27 metres high, a record achieved at the beginning of the 21st century. In the evening, a civic meal follows7.
