= Orazio Farnese, Duke of Castro =

Duke of Castro from 1547 to 1553

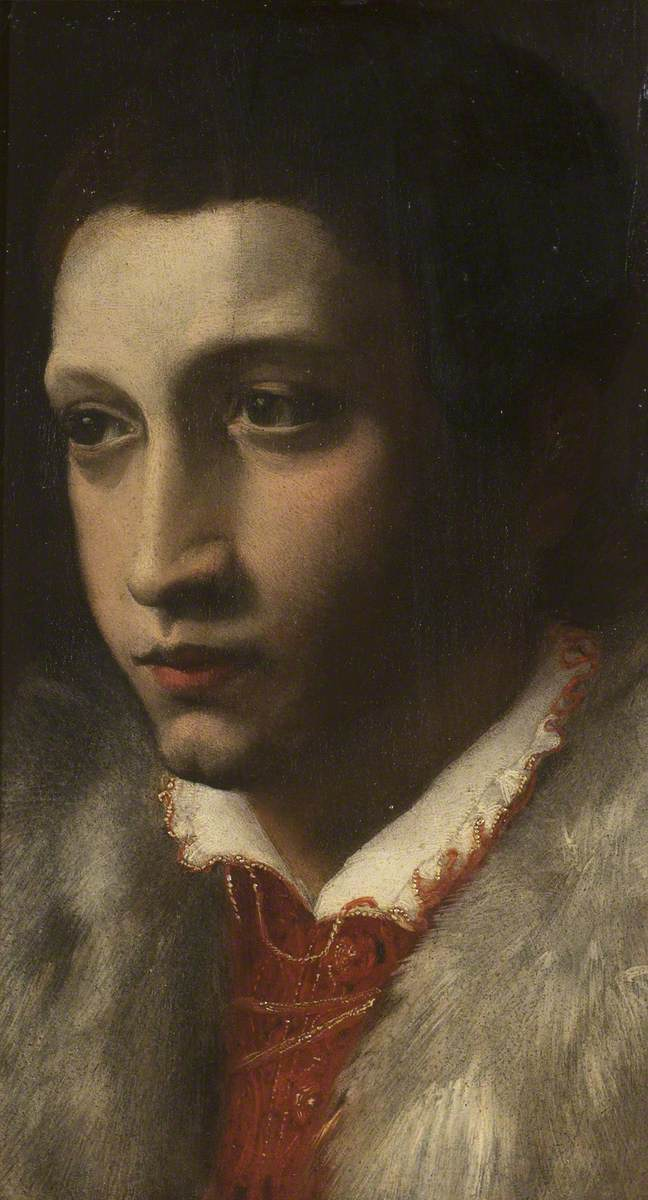
Portraitby an unknown Parmesan artist, c. 1553

Orazio Farnese, Duke of Castro (Valentano, February 1532 – Hesdin, 18 July 1553) was the third Duke of Castro.

== Biography ==
Orazio was the son of Pier Luigi Farnese, Duke of Parma and Gerolama Orsini. He married Diane de France on 14 February 1552. Orazio was at Hesdin when Emperor Charles V placed the city under siege. Orazio was killed 16 July 1553.

== Sources ==
- Vorel, Petr (2025). The Italian Crusade to Germany in 1546: Pope Paul III's Campaign Against the Lutherans. Springer. ISBN 9783031966026.

== Bibliography ==
- (in Italian) Edoardo del Vecchio, I Farnese, Istituto di Studi Romani Editore, 1972.
- (in Italian) Emilio Nasalli Rocca, I Farnese, Milano, Dall'Oglio, 1969.

Orazio Farnese, Duke of Castro House of Farnese Born: February 1532 Died: 18 July 1553
Regnal titles
Preceded by Ottavio	Duke of Castro; 1547–1553	Succeeded by Ottavio
