= Ottavio Farnese, Duke of Parma =

Italian duke (1524–1586)

Ottavio Farnese
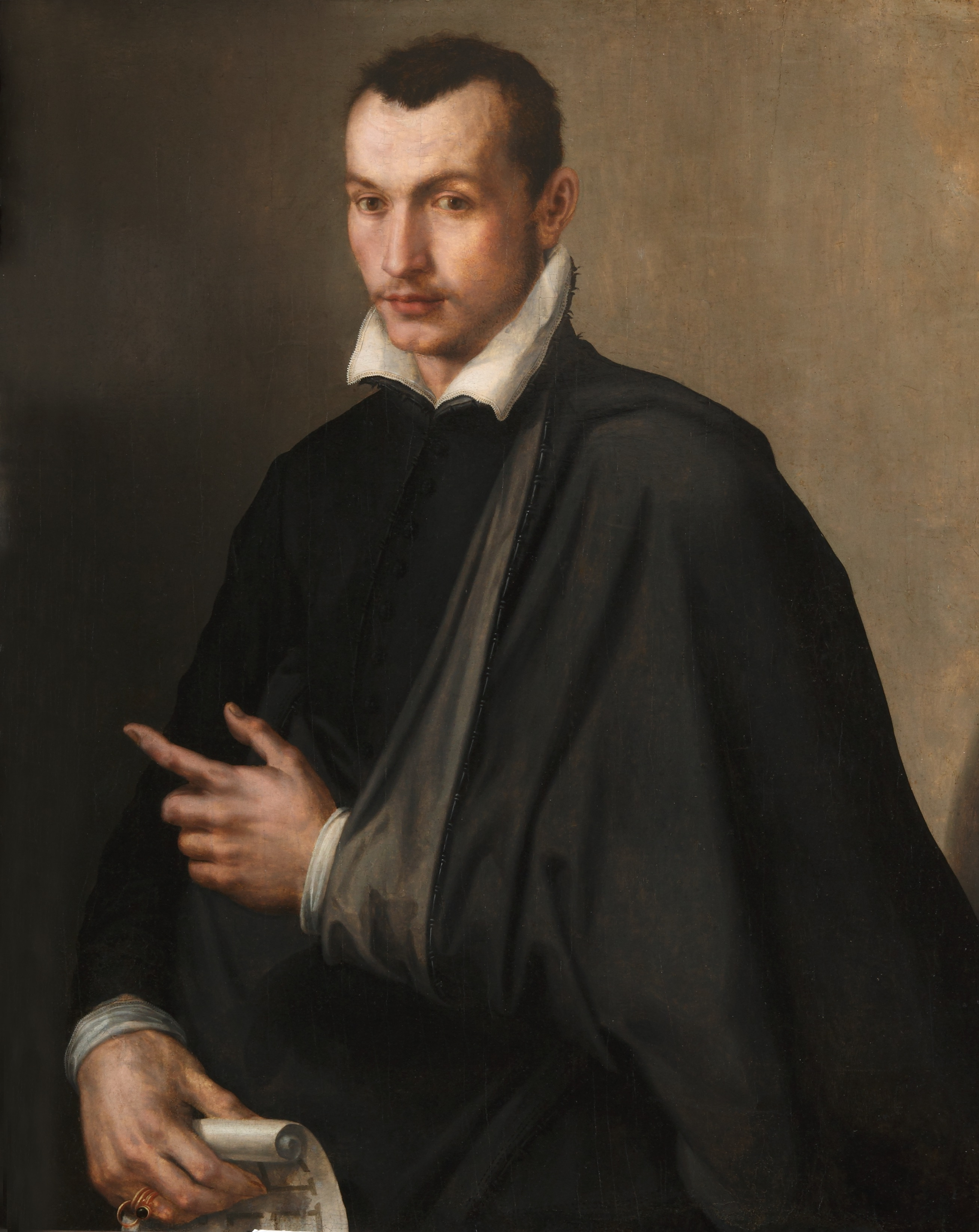
- Portrait by Maso da San Friano, c. 1551

Duke of Parma and Piacenza
- Reign: 10 September 1547 – 18 September 1586
- Predecessor: Pier Luigi Farnese
- Successor: Alessandro Farnese

Duke of Castro
- 1st reign: 23 September 1545 – 10 September 1547
- Predecessor: Pier Luigi Farnese
- Successor: Orazio Farnese
- 2nd reign: 18 July 1553 – 18 September 1586
- Predecessor: Orazio Farnese
- Successor: Alessandro Farnese
- Born: 9 October 1524; Valentano, Papal States
- Died: 18 September 1586 (aged 61); Piacenza, Duchy of Parma and Piacenza
- Burial: Santa Maria della Steccata
- Spouse: Margaret of Parma
- Issue: Alessandro Farnese, Duke of Parma
- House: Farnese
- Father: Pier Luigi Farnese, Duke of Parma
- Mother: Gerolama Orsini

Ottavio Farnese (9 October 1524 – 18 September 1586) reigned as Duke of Parma and Piacenza from 1547 until his death and Duke of Castro from 1545 to 1547 and from 1553 until his death.

== Biography ==
Coat of arms of Ottavio Farnese

Born in Valentano, Ottavio was the second son of Pier Luigi Farnese, Duke of Parma and Piacenza (eldest son of Pope Paul III) by his wife Gerolama Orsini. Ottavio's brother was Cardinal Ranuccio Farnese.

On 4 November 1538 Ottavio married Margaret of Austria, the illegitimate daughter of Charles V, Holy Roman Emperor. Ottavio was 14 years old, while Margaret, recently widowed by the death of Alessandro de' Medici, was 15. At first she disliked her youthful bridegroom, but when he returned wounded from an expedition to Algiers in 1541 her aversion was turned to affection.

Ottavio had become Duke of Camerino in 1540, but he gave up that fief when his father became duke of Parma in 1545. After the Parmesan nobility assassinated Pierluigi Farnese in 1547, troops of the Emperor occupied Piacenza. Pope Paul III attempted to regain Piacenza; he set aside Ottavio's claims to the succession of Parma, where he appointed a papal legate, giving him back Camerino in exchange, and then claimed Piacenza from the emperor — not for the Farnese, but for the Church.

Ottavio attempted to seize Parma by force, and having failed, entered into negotiations with Ferrante Gonzaga. This rebellion on the part of his grandson is believed to have hastened the Pope's death on 10 November 1549. During the interregnum that followed, Ottavio again tried to induce the governor of Parma to give up the city to him, but met with no better success; however, on the election of Giovanni Maria Ciocchi del Monte to the papacy as Julius III, the duchy was conferred on him in 1551.

This did not end Ottavio's quarrel with the Emperor Charles V, for Gonzaga refused to give up Piacenza and even threatened to occupy Parma, so that Ottavio was driven into the arms of France. Julius III, who was anxious to be on good terms with Charles V on account of the Council of Trent which was then sitting, ordered Farnese to hand Parma over to the papal authorities once more, and on his refusal hurled censures and admonitions at his head, and deprived him of his Roman fiefs, while Charles did the same with regard to those in Lombardy. A French army came to protect Parma, the War of Parma broke out, and Gonzaga at once laid siege to the city. But the duke came to an arrangement with his father-in-law, by which he regained Piacenza and his other fiefs. The rest of his life was spent quietly at home, where the moderation and wisdom of his rule won for him the affection of his people.

At his death in 1586 his only legitimate son Alessandro succeeded him.

== Issue ==
Ottavio and his wife Margherita had:

- Charles Farnese (Italian: Carlo Farnese, Spanish: Carlos Farnesio, German: Karl Farnese; 27 August 1545 – September 1545), heir to the Duchy of Parma.
- Alexander Farnese (27 August 1545 – 3 December 1592), 3rd Duke of Parma; married Infanta Maria of Portugal

Ottavio also had two other daughters:

- Violante, married to Torquato Conti (not to be confused with his grandson, Torquato Conti) (c. 1520 – c. 1575) and had issue,
- Ersilia (1565–1596), married to Renato Borromeo, Conte di Arona (1555–1608), first cousin of St. Charles Borromeo, and had issue.

== Sources ==
- Gamrath, Helge (2007). Farnese: Pomp, Power and Politics in Renaissance Italy. "L'Erma" di Bretschneider.
- Hanlon, Gregory (2019). The Hero of Italy: Odoardo Farnese, Duke of Parma, His Soldiers, and His Subjects in the Thirty Years' War. Oxford University Press.

Ottavio Farnese, Duke of Parma House of Farnese Born: 9 October 1521 Died: 18 September 1586
Regnal titles
Preceded by Pier Luigi	Duke of Parma; 1547–1586	Succeeded by Alessandro
