= Canino =

- Comune
- Comune di Canino
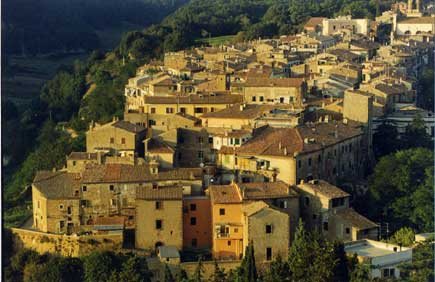
- Panorama of Castelvecchio, the most ancient district of Canino.

- Coat of arms

- Location within Italy Location within Lazio
- Coordinates: 42°27′N 11°45′E
- Country: Italy
- Region: Lazio
- Province: Viterbo (VT)

Government
  - Mayor: Giuseppe Cesetti

Area
  - Total: 124.04 km^{2} (47.89 sq mi)
- Elevation: 229 m (751 ft)

Population (30 June 2019)
  - Total: 5,255
  - Density: 42.37/km^{2} (109.7/sq mi)
- Demonym: Caninesi
- Time zone: UTC+1 (CET)
  - Summer (DST): UTC+2 (CEST)
- Postal code: 01011
- Dialing code: 0761
- Patron saint: Saint Clement
- Saint day: November 23
- Website: Official website

Canino is a town and comune of Italy, in the province of Viterbo (northern Lazio) in the internal part of Maremma Laziale. It is 15 kilometres (9 mi) west of Valentano and 44 kilometres (27 mi) northwest of Viterbo.

It is also near the ancient Etruscan town of Vulci, and the destroyed city of Castro. Lucien Bonaparte, brother of Napoleon, was lord of Canino and is buried in the town's collegiate church. Canino was also a residence of the Farnese family; future pope Paul III was born here in 1468.

The hills that surround Canino reach the Selva del Lamone and are cultivated with grapes and olive, the famous olive oil extra vergine di oliva, from the "Canina" olive variety, has been given DOP with Reg. CE n. 1263/96.
