= Cellere =

- Comune
- Comune di Cellere
- Coat of arms

- Location within Italy Location within Lazio
- Coordinates: 42°30′N 11°46′E
- Country: Italy
- Region: Lazio
- Province: Viterbo (VT)
- Frazioni: Pianiano

Government
  - Mayor: Edoardo Giustiniani

Area
  - Total: 37.2 km^{2} (14.4 sq mi)
- Elevation: 344 m (1,129 ft)

Population (30 June 2017)
  - Total: 1,169
  - Density: 31.4/km^{2} (81.4/sq mi)
- Demonym: Celleresi
- Time zone: UTC+1 (CET)
  - Summer (DST): UTC+2 (CEST)
- Postal code: 01010
- Dialing code: 0761
- Patron saint: St. Giles
- Saint day: September 1
- Website: Official website

Cellere is a comune (municipality) in the Province of Viterbo in the Italian region of Latium, located about 90 kilometres (56 mi) northwest of Rome and about 30 kilometres (19 mi) northwest of Viterbo.

The main sight is the church of Sant'Egidio Abate, designed by Antonio da Sangallo the Younger.

== History ==
Cellere is mentioned for the first time in the 8th century AD, although a Roman origin has been speculated, under the name. Later it was part of the Papal States and of the Duchy of Castro, then again, until 1870, of the Papal States.
