= House of Farnese =

Influential family in Renaissance Italy

- Blazon: Or, six fleurs-de-lis azure set 3, 2 and 1
- Country: Papal States; Duchy of Parma and Piacenza; Duchy of Castro
- Founded: 1419; 607 years ago
- Founder: Ranuccio Farnese the Old
- Final ruler: Parma: Antonio Farnese; Spain: Elisabeth Farnese
- Titles: Pope (non-hereditary); Cardinal-Bishop of Frascati (non-hereditary); Cardinal (non-hereditary); Duke of Parma; Duke of Piacenza; Duke of Castro; Count of Ronciglione; Lord of Farnese; Lord of Canino; Lord of Ischia; Lord of Cellere; Lord of Montalto; Lord of Latera; Lord of Valentano
- Styles: "His Holiness" (papacy) "Grace"
- Estates: Ducal Palace of Colorno; Palazzo del Giardino; Palazzo della Pilotta; Palazzo Farnese; Villa Farnese; Villa Farnesina; Villa Madama
- Dissolution: 1766; 260 years ago

The House of Farnese (/fɑːrˈneɪzi, -zeɪ/, also US: /-eɪsi/, Italian: [farˈneːze, -eːse]) was an influential family in Renaissance Italy. The titles of Duke of Parma and Piacenza, Duke of Latera and Duke of Castro were held by various members of the family.

Its most important members included Pope Paul III, Alessandro Farnese (a cardinal), Alexander Farnese, Duke of Parma and Piacenza (a military commander and Governor of the Spanish Netherlands), and Elisabeth Farnese, who became Queen of Spain and whose legacy was brought to her Bourbon descendants.

A number of important architectural works and antiquities are associated with the Farnese family, either through construction or acquisition. Buildings include the Palazzo Farnese in Rome and the Villa Farnese at Caprarola, and ancient artifacts include the Farnese Marbles.

== History ==
=== Origins ===
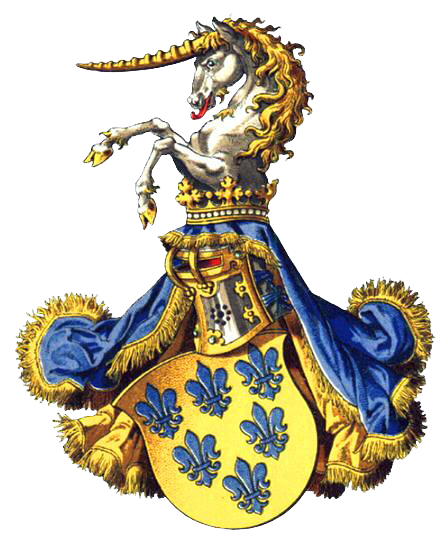
Coat of Arms of the House of Farnese as Dukes of Parma

Pope Paul III and his Grandsons by Titian shows Pope Paul III with his cardinal-nephew Alessandro Farnese (left) and his other grandson, Ottavio Farnese, Duke of Parma

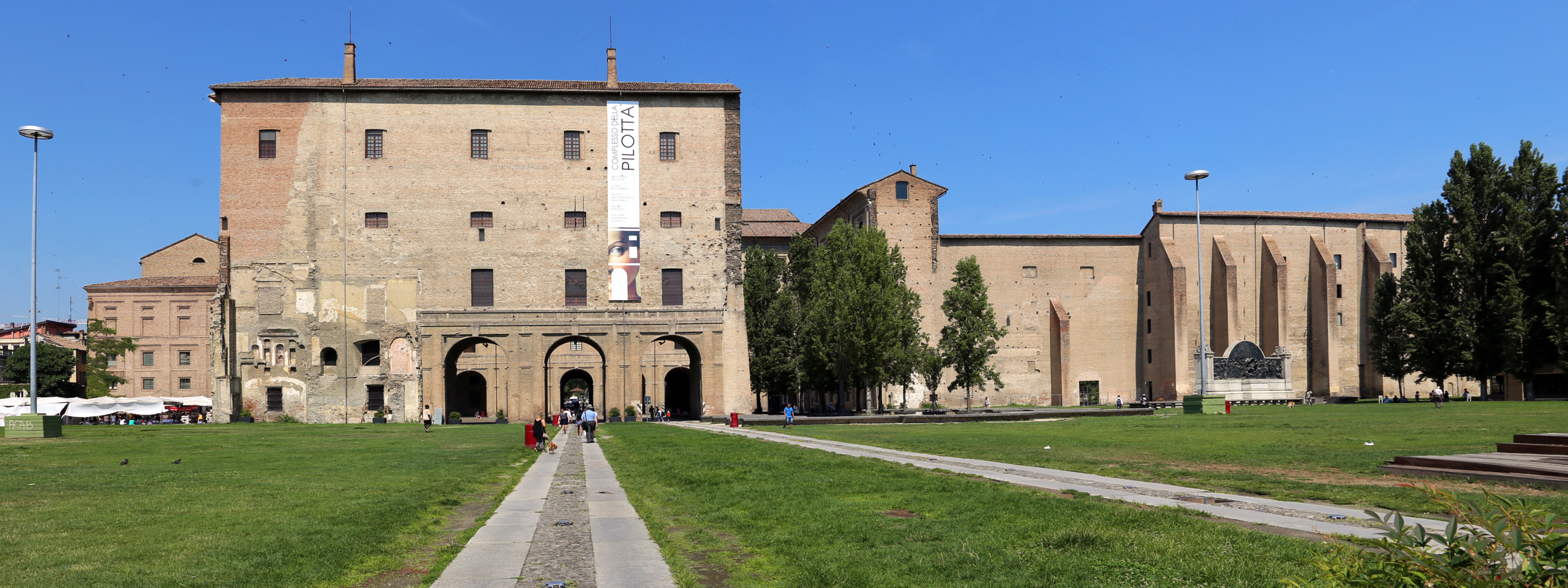
The Farnese's Palazzo della Pilotta, Parma

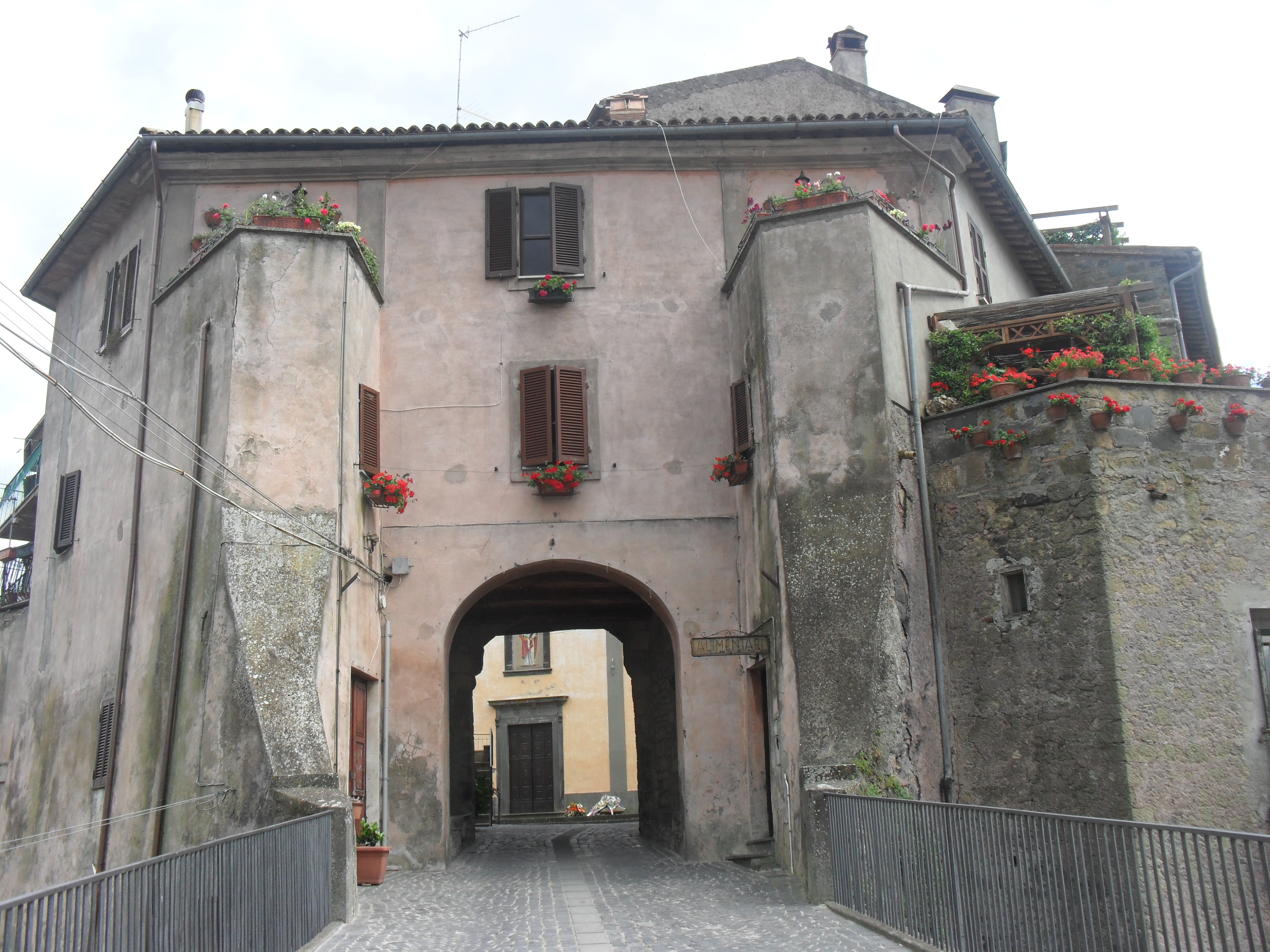
Entrance to the Ducal palace in Latera

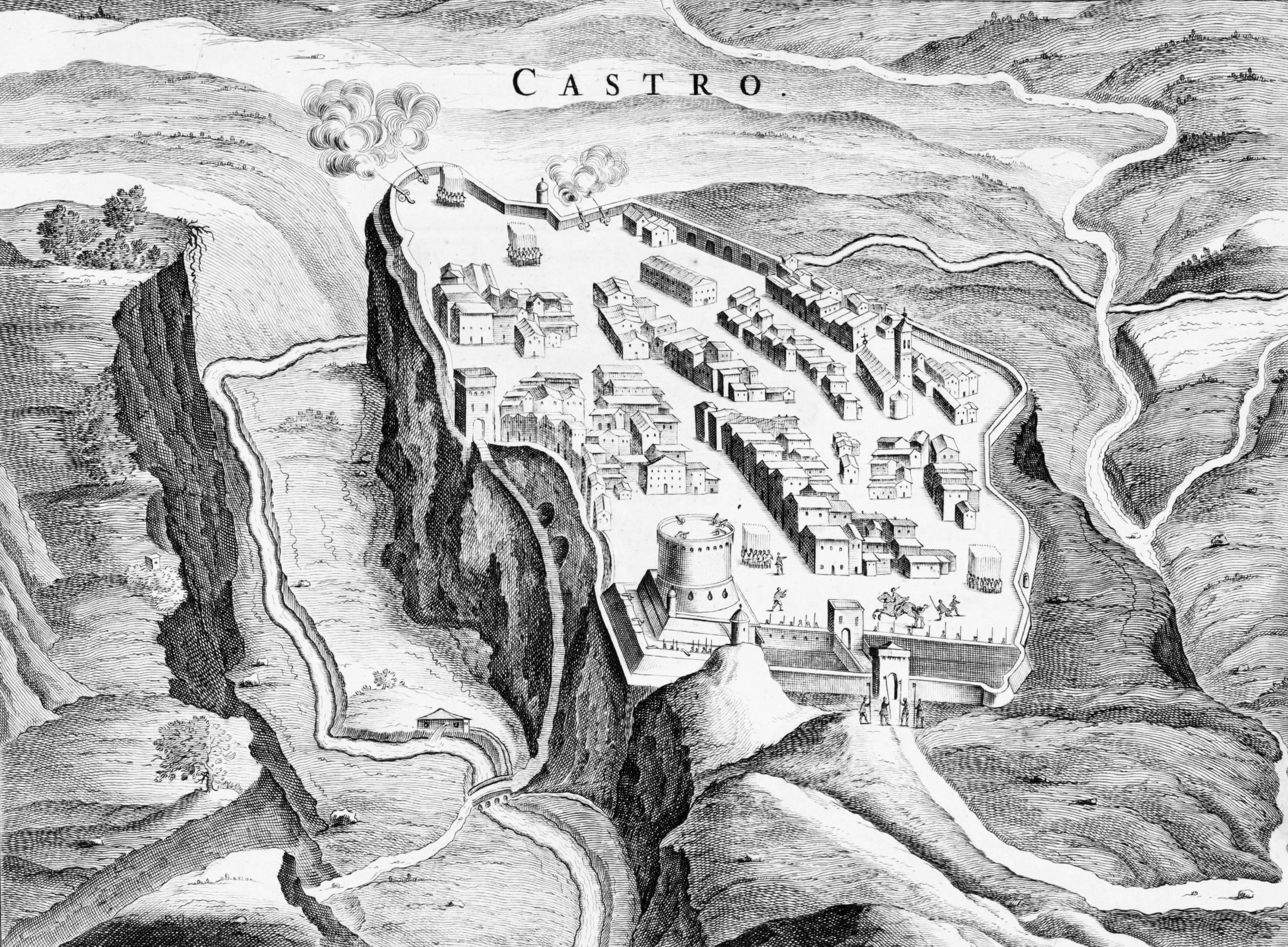
Castro, capital of the Duchy of Castro

The family could trace its origins back to around AD 984 and took its name from one of its oldest feudal possessions - Castrum Farneti. There has been some debate as to the origins of the name Farnesi/Farnese. Some suggest that it derives from the vernacular name for an oak found in the region, the Farnia (Quercus robur), but others believe that the name owes its origins to the Fara, a term of Lombard origin used to denote a particular social group.

In the 12th century, they are recorded as minor feudatories in the areas of Tuscania and Orvieto, several members holding political positions in the latter commune. One Pietro defeated the Tuscan Ghibellines in 1110 and, most likely, fought against the Italo-Normans in 1134. His son Prudenzio was consul in Orvieto and defeated the Orvieto Ghibellines backed by Siena; another Pietro defended the town against Emperor Henry VI. In 1254, one Ranuccio defeated Todi's troops and fought for Pope Urban IV against Manfred of Sicily. His son Niccolò was in the Guelph army in the Battle of Benevento (1266).

The Farnese returned to Tuscia (southern Tuscany-northern Lazio) in 1319, when they acquired Farnese, Ischia di Castro, and the castles of Sala and San Savino. In 1354, Cardinal Albornoz, in return for the family's help in the war against the Papal riotous barons, gave them the territory of Valentano. In this period they fought against the fierce Papal rivals, the Prefetti di Vico.

In 1362, Pietro Farnese was commander-in-chief of the Florentine army against Pisa in the war for Volterra. Six years later Niccolò Farnese saved Pope Urban V from the attack of Giovanni di Vico, first in the castle of Viterbo and then in that of Montefiascone. The loyalty to the Papal cause meant that the Farnese were granted confirmation of their possessions in the northern Lazio and given a series of privileges which raised them to the same level as more ancient and powerful Roman barons of the time, such as the Savelli, Orsini, Monaldeschi and Sforza of Santa Fiora.

=== Rise ===
The family substantially increased its power in the course of the 15th century, as their territories reached the southern shore of the Lake Bolsena and Montalto, largely due to Ranuccio the Elder. He was commander-in-chief of the forces of neighbouring Siena against the Orsini of Pitigliano and, after his victory, received the title of Senator of Rome. His son, Gabriele Francesco, also took up a military career, a line of employment which disappeared after three generations.

Ranuccio's son, Pier Luigi, married a member of the ancient baronial family of the Caetani (that of Pope Boniface VIII), thus giving the Farnese further importance in Rome. His daughter, Giulia, who was a mistress of Pope Alexander VI, further expanded the Roman fortunes of her family by persuading the Pope to bestow on her brother Alessandro the title of cardinal. Under Alexander's successor, Pope Julius II, he became governor of the Marca Anconetana and, in 1534, he was elected as pope and took the name of Paul III. Notable features of his reign included the establishment of the Council of Trent and an unprecedented level of nepotism. For example, two months after becoming pope in 1534, he made his 14-year-old grandson Alessandro a cardinal deacon.

Paul III died in 1549 and his political role in the Curia passed to his grandson Alessandro, who remained an influential cardinal and patron of the arts until his death in 1589.

=== Rule in Castro and Emilia ===
Paul III used his position as pontiff to increase the power and possessions of his family. He gave his illegitimate son, Pier Luigi, the title of gonfaloniere or Gonfalone of the Church. He also gave him the town of Castro with the title of Duke of Castro, granting him possession of lands from the Tyrrhenian Sea to the Lake of Bolsena, as well as the area of Ronciglione and many other smaller fiefdoms.

In 1545, Paul handed over, from land once belonging to the Papal States, further territories in northern Italy to his son, who took the additional title of Duke of Parma. Paul thus established his family as an Italian ducal dynasty, a project at which the Borgia Pope Alexander VI had failed. Two years later, Pier Luigi was assassinated by his new subjects under a Spanish mandate. Despite intrigues by Charles V, the Pope reacted promptly and soon established Ottavio, Pier Luigi's son, on the ducal throne. He secured this by marrying Ottavio (1547–86) to the eldest illegitimate daughter of Charles V, Margaret. Ottavio was given the additional title of Duke of Piacenza and initially established his court there, where work was begun on a huge Farnese palace on the banks of the River Po. However, during construction, and probably in response to political intrigues by the Piacentine nobility, Ottavio Farnese moved his court to Parma, where he had the Palazzo della Pilotta constructed in 1583.

In 1580, Ranuccio I was first in the succession line to the Kingdom of Portugal. His great-uncle Henry I of Portugal's death triggered the struggle for the throne of Portugal when Ranuccio was 11 years old. As the son of the late elder daughter of Infante Edward, 4th Duke of Guimarães, the only son of King Manuel I whose legitimate descendants survived at that time, Ranuccio was according to the succession law the first heir to the throne of Portugal. However, his father was an ally and even a subject of the Spanish king, another contender, so Ranuccio's rights were not very forcibly claimed.

The Farnese court in Parma and Piacenza under Duke Ranuccio II (1630–94) was one of the most splendid in Italy.

The Duchy of Parma and Piacenza continued to be ruled by the Farnese until the 17th century. However, the city of Castro was removed from the Farnese family holdings when the Farnese fell out with the Barberini family of Pope Urban VIII, sparking the Wars of Castro. In 1649, the conflict ended when Pope Innocent X had the city razed.

The small dukedom eventually fell under Spanish control and influence; the family lost Parma and Piacenza in 1731 when the last Farnese duke, Antonio Farnese, died without direct heirs. His collateral heir, his niece Elizabeth Farnese, Queen of Spain, passed a successful claim on to her sons, Don Carlos (later King Carlos III of Spain) and Filippo, who established the House of Bourbon-Parma, still extant as of today.

== Family tree ==
Alessandro Farnese (Pope Paul III) (1468–1549)
(illeg.) Costanza (1500–1545)	(illeg.) Pier Luigi (1503–1547)	(illeg.) Ranuccio	(illeg.) Paolo
Alessandro (1520–1589)	Vittoria (1521–1602)	Ottavio (1524–1586)	Ranuccio (1530–1565)	(illeg.) Orazio (1531–1553)
Alessandro (1545–1592)	Carlo
Margherita (1567–1643)	Ranuccio I (1569–1622)	Odoardo (1573–1626)
Alessandro	Odoardo I (1612–1646)	Maria (1615–1646)	Vittoria (1618–1649)	Francesco Maria (1619–1647)	(illeg.) Ottavio (1598–1643)
Ranuccio II (1630–1694)	Alessandro (1635–1689)	Orazio (1636–1656)	Caterina (1637–1684)	Pietro (1639–1677)
Margherita Maria (1664–1718)	Teresa (1665–1702)	Odoardo II (1666–1693)	Francesco (1678–1727)	Antonio (1679–1731)
Elisabetta (1692–1766)
House of Bourbon-Parma

== Most notable members ==
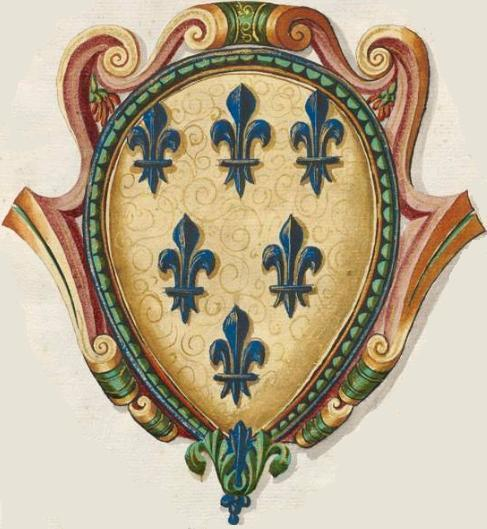
Early arms of the family

- Pietro Farnese (c. 1310–1363)
- Ranuccio Farnese (1390–1450)
- Pier Luigi Farnese (1435–87)
- Pope Paul III, born Alessandro Farnese (1468–1549)
- Giulia Farnese, mistress of Pope Alexander VI and sister of Pope Paul III
- Pier Luigi Farnese, first Duke of Parma (1503–47)
- Alessandro Farnese, Cardinal (1520–89)
- Ottavio Farnese, second Duke of Parma (1524–86)
- Ranuccio Farnese, Cardinal (1530–65)
- Alessandro Farnese, third Duke of Parma (1545–92)
- Ranuccio I Farnese, fourth Duke of Parma (1569–1622)
- Odoardo Farnese, fifth Duke of Parma (1612–46)
- Ranuccio II Farnese, sixth Duke of Parma (1630–94)
- Francesco Farnese, seventh Duke of Parma (1678–1727)
- Antonio Farnese, eighth Duke of Parma (1679–1731)
- Elizabeth Farnese, Queen of Spain, wife of King Philip V, mother of Charles III (1692–1766)

== Armorial ==
Figure	Date and blason
	The Farnèse family Or, six fleurs-de-lis azure set 3, 2 and 1.
	1545–1586 Per pale: 1 and 3, or, three fleurs-de-lis azure, 2. gules, papal tiara or, surmounted by two keys argent and or in saltire and interlaced at their intersection with a cord azure (for Papal State).
	1586–1592 I, quarterly: 1 and 4, or, six fleurs-de-lys azure, in three, two and one, (for Farnèse); 2 and 3, per pale, gules, a fess argent (for Austria) and bendy of six, or and azure, a bordure gules (for Burgundy). II, tierced in fess: Gules, papal tiara or, surmounted by two keys argent and or in saltire and interlaced at their intersection with a cord azure (for Papal State).
	1592–1731 I, quarterly: 1 and 4, or, six fleurs-de-lys azure, in three, two and one, (for Farnèse); 2 and 3, per pale, gules, a fess argent (for Austria) and bendy of six, or and azure, a bordure gules (for Burgundy). II, tierced in fess: Gules, papal tiara or, surmounted by two keys argent and or in saltire and interlaced at their intersection with a cord azure (for Papal State), overall, argent, five escutcheons in cross azure, each charged with five plates in saltire, a bordure gules charged with seven three-towered castles or (for Portugal).

== Bibliography ==
- Annibali, Flaminio Maria (1817–18). Notizie Storiche della Casa Farnese. Montefiascone.
- del Vecchio, Edoardo (1972). I Farnese. Rome: Istituto di studi romani editore.
- Drei, Giovanni (1954). I Farnese grandezza e decadenza di una dinastia italiana. Rome: La Libreria dello Stato.
- Nasalli Rocca, Emilio (1969). I Farnese. dell’Oglio.
