= Farnese, Lazio =

Farnese
- Comune
- Comune di Farnese
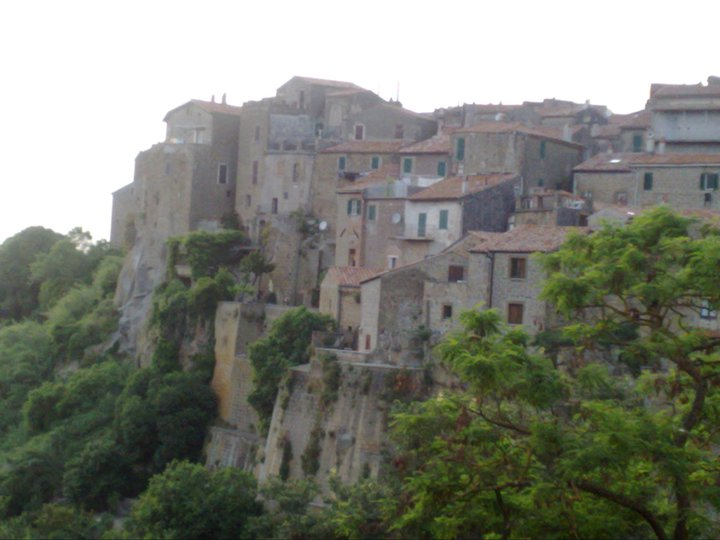

- Coat of arms

- Location within Italy Location within Lazio
- Coordinates: 42°33′N 11°43′E
- Country: Italy
- Region: Lazio
- Province: Viterbo (VT)

Government
  - Mayor: Massimo Biagini

Area
  - Total: 52.38 km^{2} (20.22 sq mi)
- Elevation: 341 m (1,119 ft)

Population (31 July 2017)
  - Total: 1,494
  - Density: 28.52/km^{2} (73.87/sq mi)
- Demonym: Farnesani
- Time zone: UTC+1 (CET)
  - Summer (DST): UTC+2 (CEST)
- Postal code: 01010
- Dialing code: 0761
- Patron saint: St. Isidore
- Saint day: May 10
- Website: Official website

Farnese is a comune (municipality) in the Province of Viterbo in the Italian region of Latium, located about 100 kilometres (62 mi) northwest of Rome and about 35 kilometres (22 mi) northwest of Viterbo.

== Geography ==
Farnese borders the following municipalities: Ischia di Castro, Pitigliano, Valentano.

== Personalities ==
The well-known Italian-Brazilian sculptor Victor Brecheret is born in Farnese.
