= Ranuccio Farnese (cardinal) =

Italian prelate

Ranuccio Farnese O.S.Io.Hieros.
- Cardinal-Bishop of Sabina
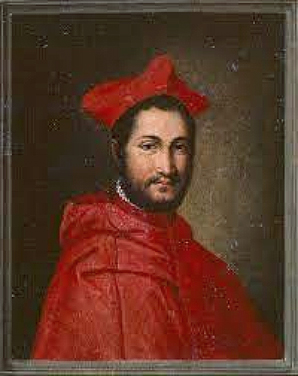
- Ranuccio Cardinal Farnese
- Church: Catholic Church
- Diocese: Suburbicarian Diocese of Sabina
- In office: 7 February 1565 – 29 October 1565
- Predecessor: Alessandro Farnese
- Successor: Tiberio Crispo
- Other posts: Administrator of Bologna (1564-1565); Titular Patriarch of Constantinople (1554-1565); Archpriest of Archbasilica of Saint John Lateran (1547-1565); Major Penitentiary of the Apostolic Penitentiary (1547-1565)
- Previous posts: Cardinal-Deacon of Sant'Angelo in Pescheria (1546-1565); Administrator of Ravenna (1549-1564); Admministrator of Naples (1544-1549); Cardinal-Deacon of Santa Lucia in Selci (1546)

Orders
- Created cardinal: 16 December 1545 by Pope Paul III

Personal details
- Born: 11 August 1530 Valentano, Papal States
- Died: 29 October 1565 (aged 35) Parma, Duchy of Parma and Piacenza

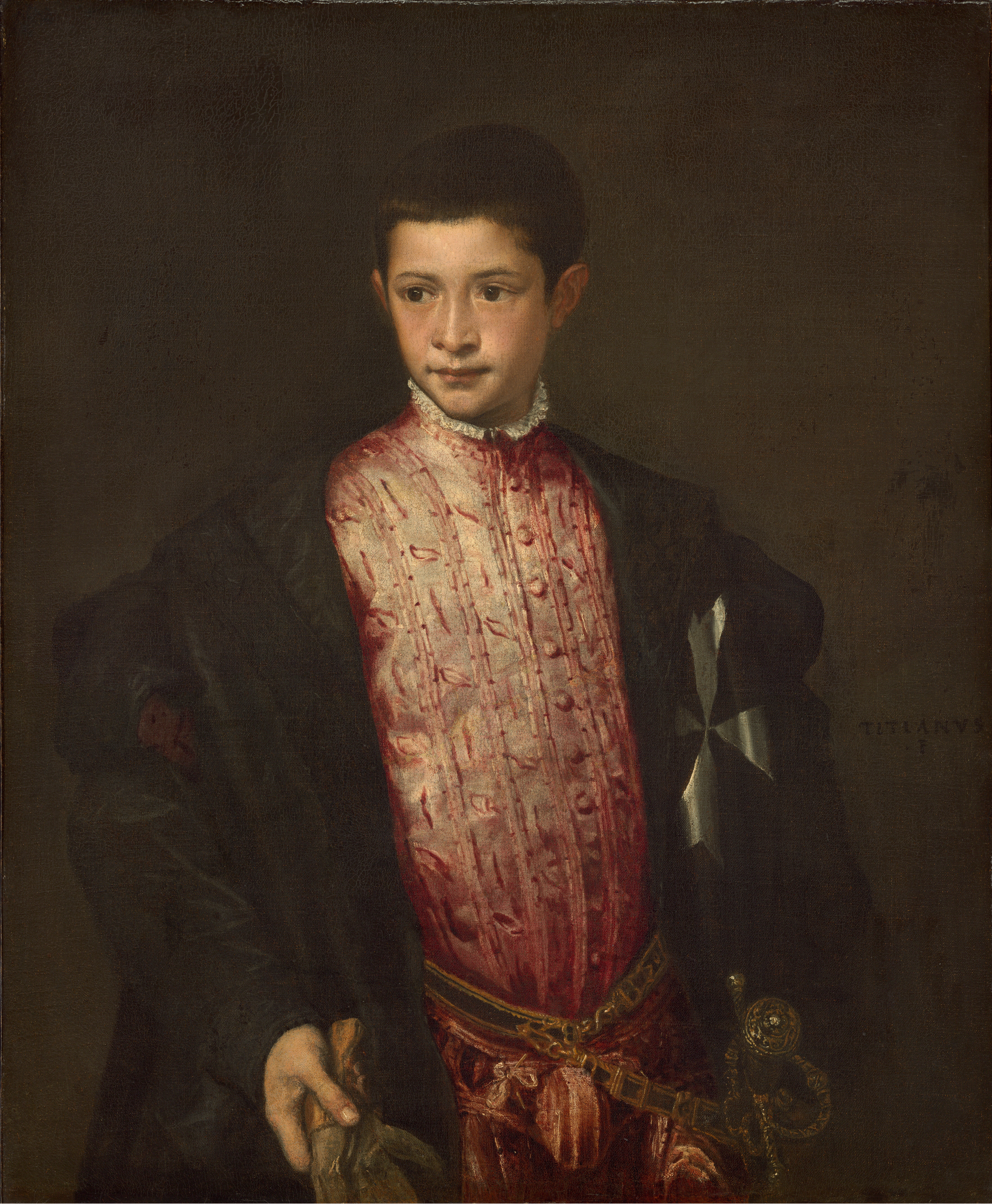
Titian's portrait of the 12-year-old Ranuccio Farnese.

Ranuccio Farnese (11 August 1530 – 29 October 1565) was an Italian prelate of the Farnese family, who was Cardinal of Santa Lucia in Selci from 1545 to his death in 1565. Son of Pier Luigi Farnese, the illegitimate son of Pope Paul III, Farnese was created Cardinal at the age of 15 by his grandfather the pope: he was nicknamed the cardinalino ("little cardinal") for his young age.

== Biography ==
Ranuccio Farnese was born in Valentano. As a 12-year-old, he was made prior of the Knights of Malta's important property San Giovanni dei Forlani in Venice. He was also administrator of the archdiocese of Naples, and was granted several bishoprics; Farnese was twice the titular Latin Patriarch of Constantinople, from 1546 to 1550 and 1554?-1565. Farnese was patron to Federico Commandino, an important translator of ancient Greek mathematical works.

Farnese's brother, Ottavio Farnese, was Duke of Parma, and his brother Alessandro Farnese was also a cardinal.

He is buried in the Archbasilica of St. John Lateran in Rome.
