= Duchy of Castro =

Fiefdom in central Italy from 1537 to 1649

Duchy of Castro Ducato di Castro (Italian) Ducatus Castri (Latin)
- 1537–1649
- Flag Coat of arms
- Motto: Castrum civitas fidelis (Latin for 'The castle is a faithful city')
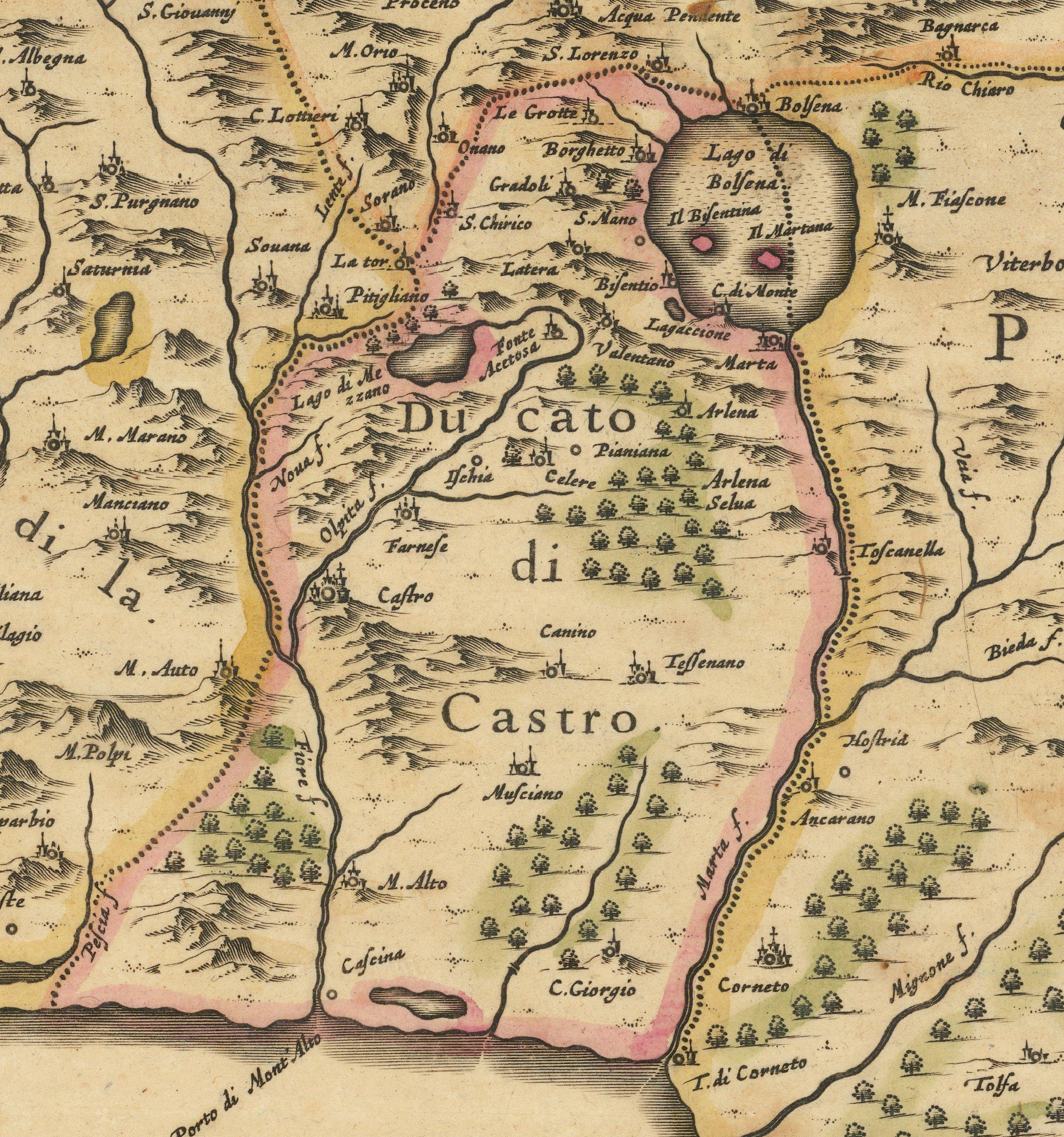
- The Duchy of Castro. Detail from a map by W.J. Blaeu (1640)

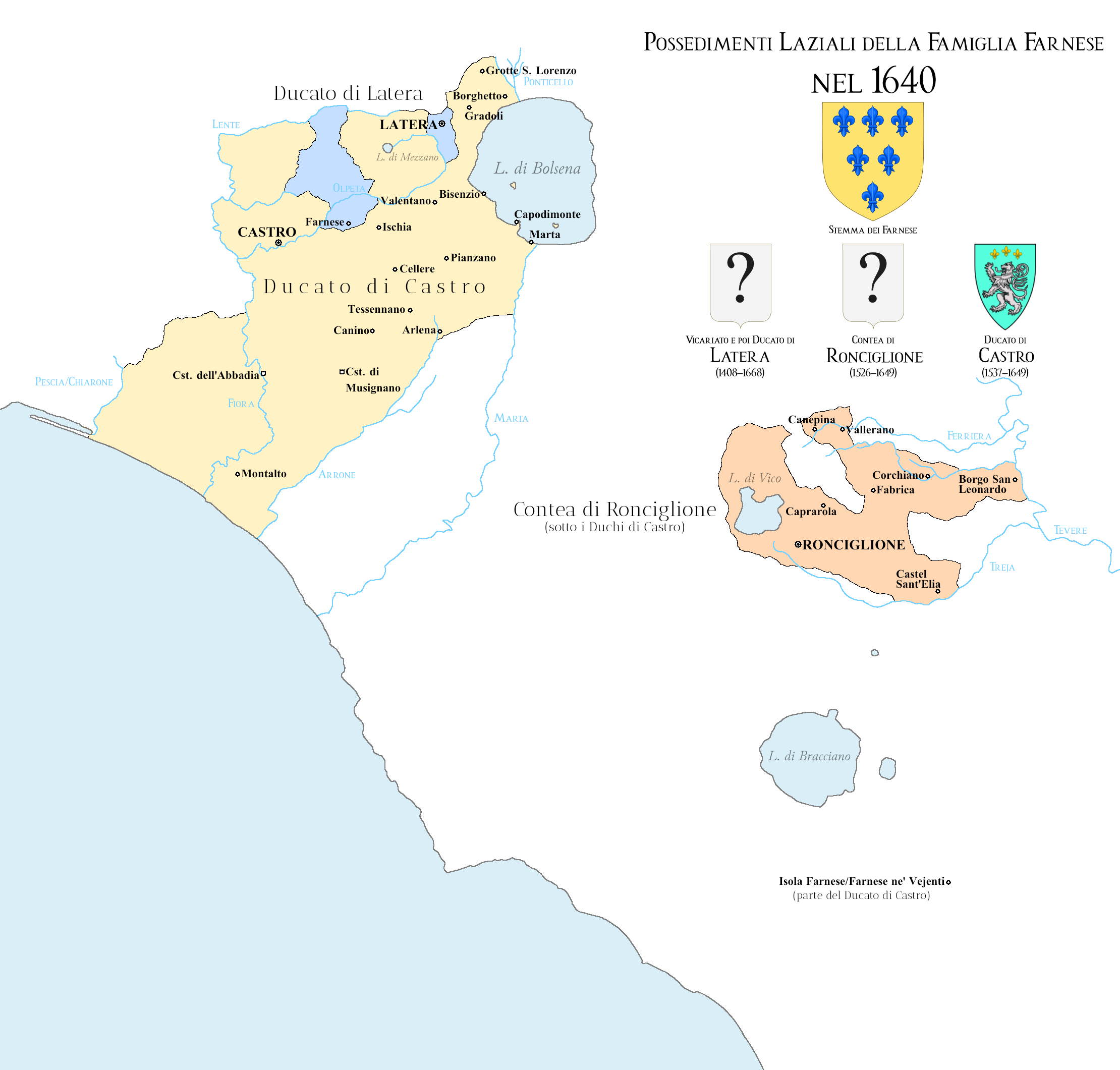
- Duchy of Castro and other Farnese possessions in 1640
- Status: Vassal of the Papal States
- Capital: Castro
- Common languages: Latin; Italian
- Religion: Catholicism
- Government: Non-sovereign monarchy
- Duke
  - 1537–1545: Pier Luigi Farnese (first)
  - 1646–1649: Ranuccio II Farnese (last)
- Historical era: Early modern era
  - Created by Pope Paul III: 1537
  - Ranuccio II is forced to cede the lands back to Pope Innocent X: 1649
Preceded by	Succeeded by
Papal States	Papal States
- Today part of: Italy

The Duchy of Castro was a fiefdom in central Italy formed in 1537 from a small strip of land on what is now Lazio's border with Tuscany, centred on Castro, a fortified city on a tufa cliff overlooking the Fiora River which was its capital and ducal residence. While technically a vassal state of the Papal States, it enjoyed de facto independence under the rule of the House of Farnese until 1649, when it was subsumed back into the Papal States and administered by the House of Stampa di Ferentino.

It was created a duchy by Pope Paul III (1534–1549) in the bull Videlicet immeriti on 31 October 1537, with his son Pier Luigi Farnese and his firstborn male heirs as its dukes. It lasted approximately 112 years and was eclipsed by the Farnese's possessions in Parma. It stretched from the Tyrrhenian Sea to the Lago di Bolsena, in the strip of land bounded by the river Marta and the river Fiora, stretching back to the Olpeta stream and the lago di Mezzano, from which the Olpeta flows. The duchy of Latera and county of Ronciglione were annexed to it.

The title of Duke of Castro has been held since the late 1860s by the claimant to the headship of the House of Bourbon-Two Sicilies, since the Kingdom of the Two Sicilies was annexed to the newborn Kingdom of Italy. Prince Carlo, Duke of Castro currently holds the tile.

== List of Dukes of Castro ==
- 1537-1545: Pier Luigi Farnese
- 1545-1547: Ottavio Farnese
- 1547-1553: Orazio Farnese
- 1553-1586: Ottavio Farnese
- 1586-1592: Alexander Farnese
- 1592-1622: Ranuccio I Farnese
- 1622-1646: Odoardo Farnese
- 1646-1649: Ranuccio II Farnese
