= Palazzo Gio Battista Grimaldi (Vico San Luca) =

Palazzo Gio Battista Grimaldi (vico San Luca)
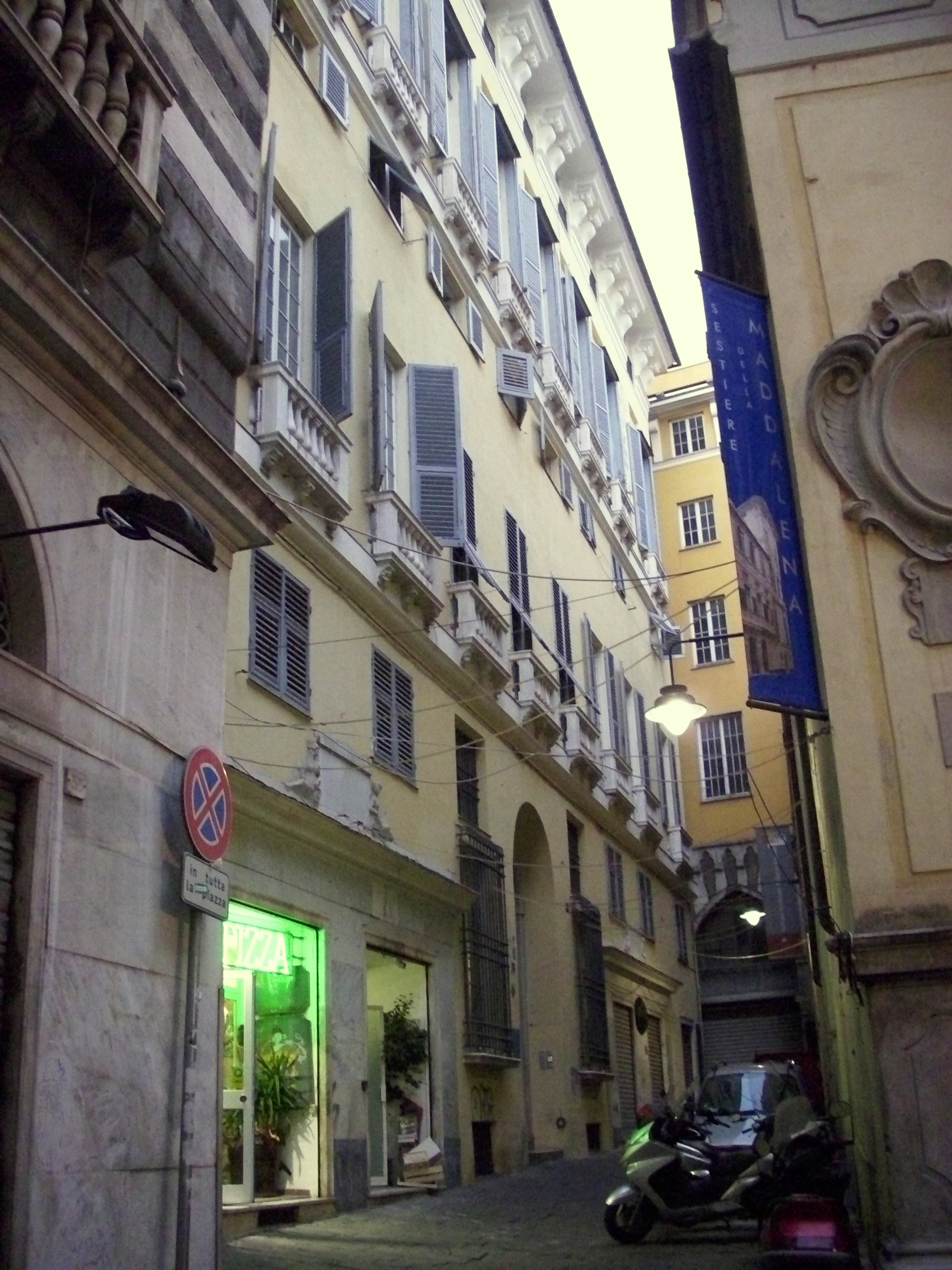
- Gio Battista Grimaldi (vico San Luca) in via Vico San Luca 4
- Interactive map of the Palazzo Gio Battista Grimaldi (vico San Luca) area

General information
- Status: In use
- Type: Palace
- Architectural style: Mannerist, Baroque
- Location: Genoa, Italy, 4, Via Vico San Luca
- Coordinates: 44.409039°N 8.929828°E
- Construction started: 1610
- Completed: 1610

UNESCO World Heritage Site
- Part of: Genoa: Le Strade Nuove and the system of the Palazzi dei Rolli
- Criteria: Cultural: (ii)(iv)
- Reference: 1211
- Inscription: 2006 (30th Session)

The palazzo Gio Battista Grimaldi is a building in vico San Luca at no. 4 in the historical centre of Genoa, included on 13 July 2006 in the list of the 42 palaces inscribed in the Rolli di Genova that became World Heritage by UNESCO on that date.

== History ==
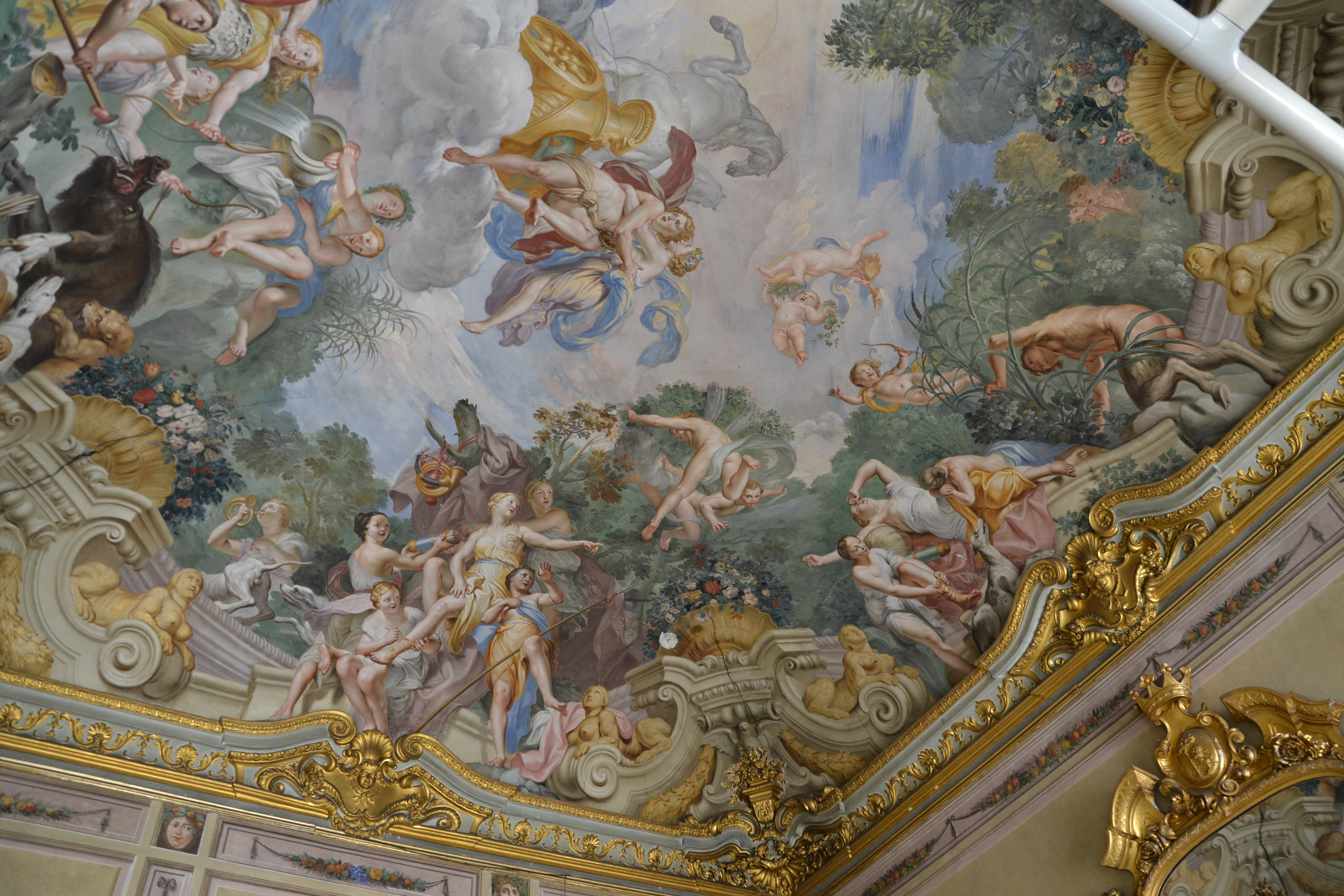
Lorenzo De Ferrari, Hunting Diana, vault of a hall

The palace was built by Marquis Giovanni Battista Grimaldi around 1610, on the pre-existence of four terraced dwellings set above a continuous portico called in the 13th century «vaults of the Grimaldi». To facilitate the construction of the new building, it became necessary to break through the vico San Luca. Initially thought to be a project by Alessi, it is now attributed to the Lombard architect Andrea Vannone.

Present in all the rolls of Genoa, the building was included in the Rubensian edition of Palazzi di Genova of 1622. It retains its connotation as a modern aristocratic palace, readable above all through the atrium-staircase system, the distributional solutions and the elevation, which have remained unchanged to this day. In the 18th century, the Grimaldis financed a vast cycle of late Baroque frescoes by Lorenzo De Ferrari.

In recent centuries, after the doge of the Republic of Genoa Pier Francesco Grimaldi (1773—1775), it was also owned by the Pratolongo, Brignole and Cattaneo di Belforte families. The Marquis Niccolò Brignole, who bought it in 1865, commissioned important works to decorate and embellish the staircase, the two noble floors and the upper Belvedere.

Attualmente ospita uno studio di architettura.

== Description ==
Two halls on the piano nobile preserve the decorations commissioned by Luca Grimaldi, Doge of Genoa from 1728. They are works by Lorenzo De Ferrari, the last exponent of the famous family of fresco painters, probably dating back to the third decade of the 18th century. In the room with The Hunting of Diana, on the vault entirely covered with frescoes, the myth of Aurora and Cephalus stands out in the centre, while on the sides is represented the goddess Diana awakening her handmaidens and spurring them on in the wild boar hunt, observed from afar by satyrs. The room with Justice holding the insignia of power still bears the entire decoration that seamlessly covers the walls and ceiling, conceived by de Ferrari with probable celebratory intentions towards Doge Grimaldi. Justice, in the centre, is surrounded by allegories of the effects of good justice and bad justice.

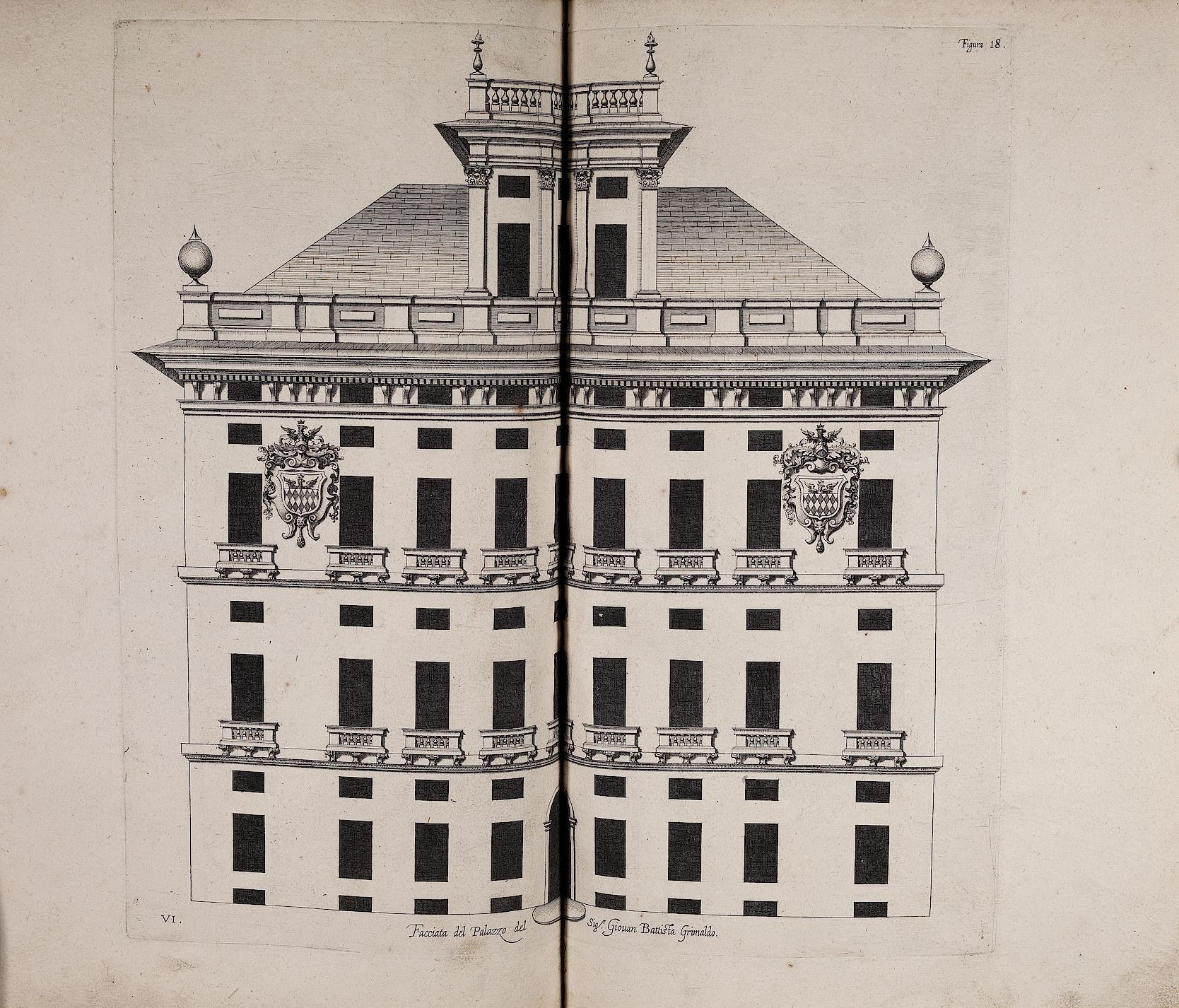
Pieter Paul Rubens - Palazzi di Genova, vol. II

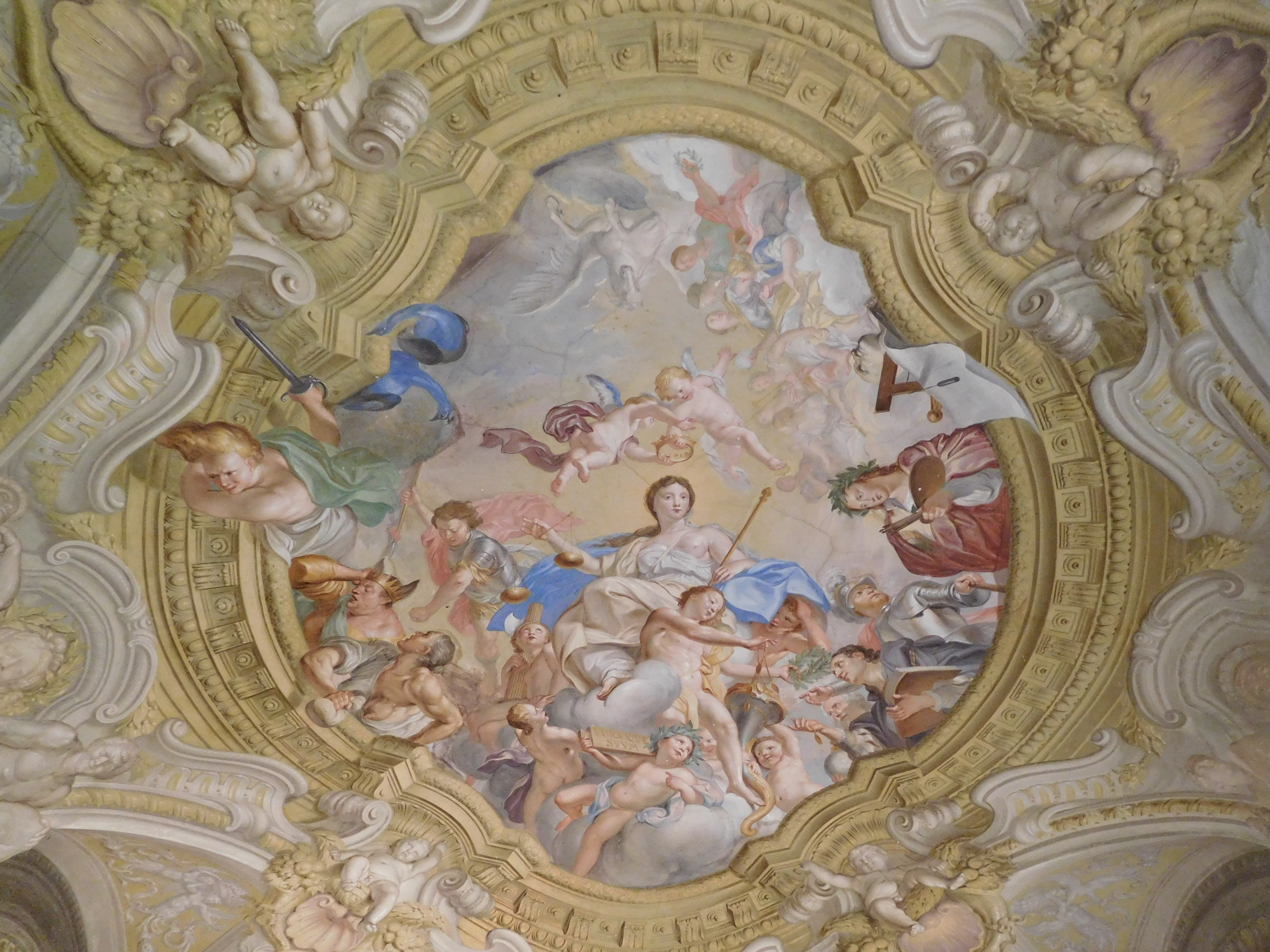
Lorenzo De Ferrari, Allegory of Justice

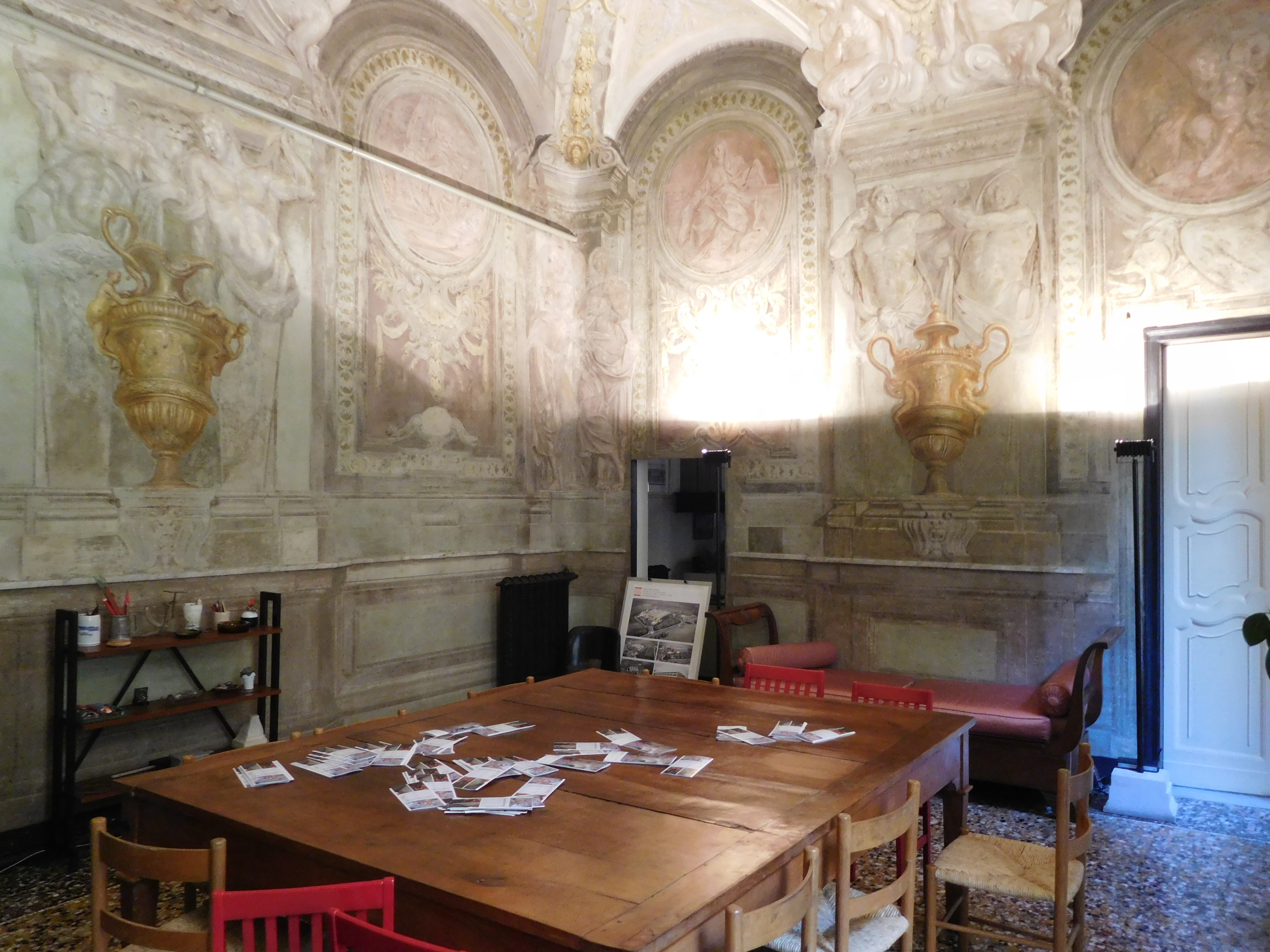
The Hall of Justice

== Sources ==
=== Italian sources ===
- L. Lagomarsino, Palazzo Giovanni Battista Grimaldi, in “Arkos”, supplemento al n. 7/2004 “Il restauro dei palazzi dei Rolli”, pp. 60–63.
- E. Gavazza, L. Magnani, Pittura e decorazione a Genova e in Liguria nel Settecento, Genova 2000.
