= Albergati =

Albergati is an Italian surname. Notable people with the surname include:

- Antonio Albergati (1566–1634), Italian bishop
- Fabio Albergati (1538–1606), Italian diplomat
- Gregorio Albergati (died 1126), Italian cardinal
- Niccolò Albergati (1373–1443), Italian cardinal
- Pirro Albergati (1663–1735), Italian aristocrat and composer

== See also ==
- Niccolò Albergati-Ludovisi (1608–1687), Italian cardinal
- Palazzo Albergati
