= Angelo Banchero =

Italian painter

Angelo Giacinto Banchero (1744–1793) was an Italian painter of the Neoclassic period.

He was born in Sestri Ponente in Genoese territory. Orphaned at the age of two, his older brother apprenticed him to a local painter. Seeing Angelo's talent, his brother and a Genoese patron, Giovanni Battista Rossi, arranged to have him work in the studio of Pompeo Batoni in Rome. On his return to Genoa, he executed a portrait of the new Duke, Giovanni Battista Cambiaso. He also painted the main altarpiece, John the Baptist preaches to the mob, for the church of the Battistine Nuns, near Santa Maria Maggiore, Rome. He completed two paintings for a church at Sestri.

Slow and meticulous in style, his output was limited. He painted an unfinished altarpiece for the parish church of San Siro a Nervi. A heart ailment led to a stroke at the age of 49 years. One of his pupils was Pietro Pedroni.
