= Giovanni Delfino =

Giovanni Delfino may refer to:

- Giovanni Dolfin (died 1361), fifty-seventh Doge of Venice
- Giovanni Delfino (bishop of Brescia) (1529–1584), Italian Roman Catholic bishop
- Giovanni Delfino (camerlengo) (1545–1622), Camerlengo of the Sacred College of Cardinals
- Giovanni Delfino (cardinal) (1617-1699), Italian Roman Catholic cardinal
- Giovanni Delfino (bishop of Belluno) (died 1651), Italian Roman Catholic bishop
