= Angelelli =

Angelelli is an Italian surname. Notable people with the surname include:

- Cheryl Angelelli (born 1968), American para-swimmer
- Enrique Angelelli (1923–1976), Argentine bishop
- Giuseppe Angelelli (1803–1844), Italian painter
- Max Angelelli (born 1966), Italian racecar driver
