= Collegiata di San Giovanni Evangelista, Valentano =

Roman Catholic church in Lazio, Italy

Coordinates: 42°34′06″N 11°49′08″E

The Chiesa Collegiata di Giovanni Evangelista or Collegiate Church of St John the Evangelist is a Romanesque style Roman Catholic church in Valentano in the province of Viterbo, region of Lazio, Italy.

== History ==
A church or chapel was built circa the year 1000, but refurbished many times. It was assigned the title of parish church in 1253 by Pope Innocent IV. The sober facade with a high oculus and pilasters dates to the 14th century. The Renaissance-style portal displays the heraldic arms of Cardinal Alessandro Farnese (1520-1589); the Bishop of Montefiascone (Cardinal Bentivoglio); as well as the symbols of the town of Valentano.

The interior retains it Mannerist and Baroque decorations, and includes a fresco depicting the Crucifixion attributed to Marcello Venusti. Among the altarpieces are the following works:

- Madonna and Child with Souls of Purgatory by Corrado Giaquinto
- Madonna of the Rosary with St Dominic and St Catherine (1700) by Pietro Lucatelli
- Two canvases depicting St John the Evangelist (late 18th-century) by Pietro Padroni
- Madonna and Child with Saints Peter and Paul by Alessandro Mattia da Farnese, originally found in the local church of Santa Maria
- Saints Francis, Lucy, and Agatha (1711) by Francesco Maria Bonifazi
