= Guglielmo Gaddi =

Italian Roman Catholic prelate

Most Reverend Guglielmo Gaddi
- Bishop of Bisceglie
- Church: Catholic Church
- Diocese: Diocese of Bisceglie
- In office: 1643–1652
- Predecessor: Bernardino Scala
- Successor: Giuseppe Lomellini

Orders
- Consecration: 27 September 1643 by Antonio Marcello Barberini

Personal details
- Born: 1599 Forlì, Italy
- Died: 1652 (age 53) Bisceglie, Italy

Guglielmo Gaddi (1599–1652) was a Roman Catholic prelate who served as Bishop of Bisceglie (1643–1652).

== Biography ==
Guglielmo Gaddi was born in Forlì, Italy in 1599. On 31 August 1643, he was appointed during the papacy of Pope Urban VIII as Bishop of Bisceglie. On 27 September 1643, he was consecrated bishop by Antonio Marcello Barberini, Cardinal-Priest of Sant'Onofrio. He served as Bishop of Bisceglie until his death in 1652.

== External links and additional sources ==
- Orazione recitata nelle solenni esequie dell'illustrissimo, e reuerendissimo monsignore Guglielmo Gaddi vescouo di Bisceglia in Forlì sua patria nella chiesa di San Girolamo dedicata all'altezza serenissima di Parma. per li Cimatti. 1652.
- Cheney, David M. "Diocese of Bisceglie". Catholic-Hierarchy.org. (for Chronology of Bishops) ^{[self-published]}
- Chow, Gabriel. "Diocese of Bisceglie (Italy)". GCatholic.org. (for Chronology of Bishops) ^{[self-published]}

Catholic Church titles
Preceded by Bernardino Scala	Bishop of Bisceglie; 1643–1652	Succeeded by Giuseppe Lomellini
