= Gereon Otto von Gutmann zu Sobernheim =

Catholic prelate

Most Reverend Gereon Otto von Gutmann zu Sobernheim
- Auxiliary Bishop of Cologne; Titular Bishop of Cyrene
- Church: Catholic Church
- Archdiocese: Archdiocese of Cologne
- In office: 1616–1638

Orders
- Ordination: 1598
- Consecration: 9 October 1616 by Antonio Albergati

Personal details
- Born: 1571 Koblenz, Germany
- Died: 25 September 1638 (age 67) Cologne, Germany

Gereon Otto von Gutmann zu Sobernheim (1571 – 25 September 1638) was a Catholic prelate who served as Auxiliary Bishop of Cologne (1616–1638).

== Biography ==
Gereon Otto von Gutmann zu Sobernheim was born in Koblenz, Germany in 1571 and ordained a priest in 1598. On 30 August 1606, he was appointed during the papacy of Pope Paul V as Auxiliary Bishop of Cologne and Titular Bishop of Cyrene. On 9 October 1616, he was consecrated bishop by Antonio Albergati, Bishop of Bisceglie. He served as Auxiliary Bishop of Cologne until his death on 25 September 1638.

While bishop, he was the principal consecrator of Johannes Pelking, Auxiliary Bishop of Paderborn (1620); and the principal co-consecrator of Otto von Senheim, Auxiliary Bishop of Trier (1634).

== External links and additional sources ==
- Cheney, David M. "Cyrene (Titular See)". Catholic-Hierarchy.org. (for Chronology of Bishops) ^{[self-published]}
- Chow, Gabriel. "Titular Episcopal See of Cyrene (Libya)". GCatholic.org. (for Chronology of Bishops) ^{[self-published]}
- Cheney, David M. "Archdiocese of Köln {Cologne}". Catholic-Hierarchy.org. (for Chronology of Bishops) ^{[self-published]}
- Chow, Gabriel. "Metropolitan Archdiocese of Köln (Germany)". GCatholic.org. (for Chronology of Bishops) ^{[self-published]}
