= Antonio Marcello Barberini =

Italian cardinal (1569–1646)

His Eminence Antonio Marcello Barberini
- Major Penitentiary of the Apostolic Penitentiary; Librarian of the Vatican Library
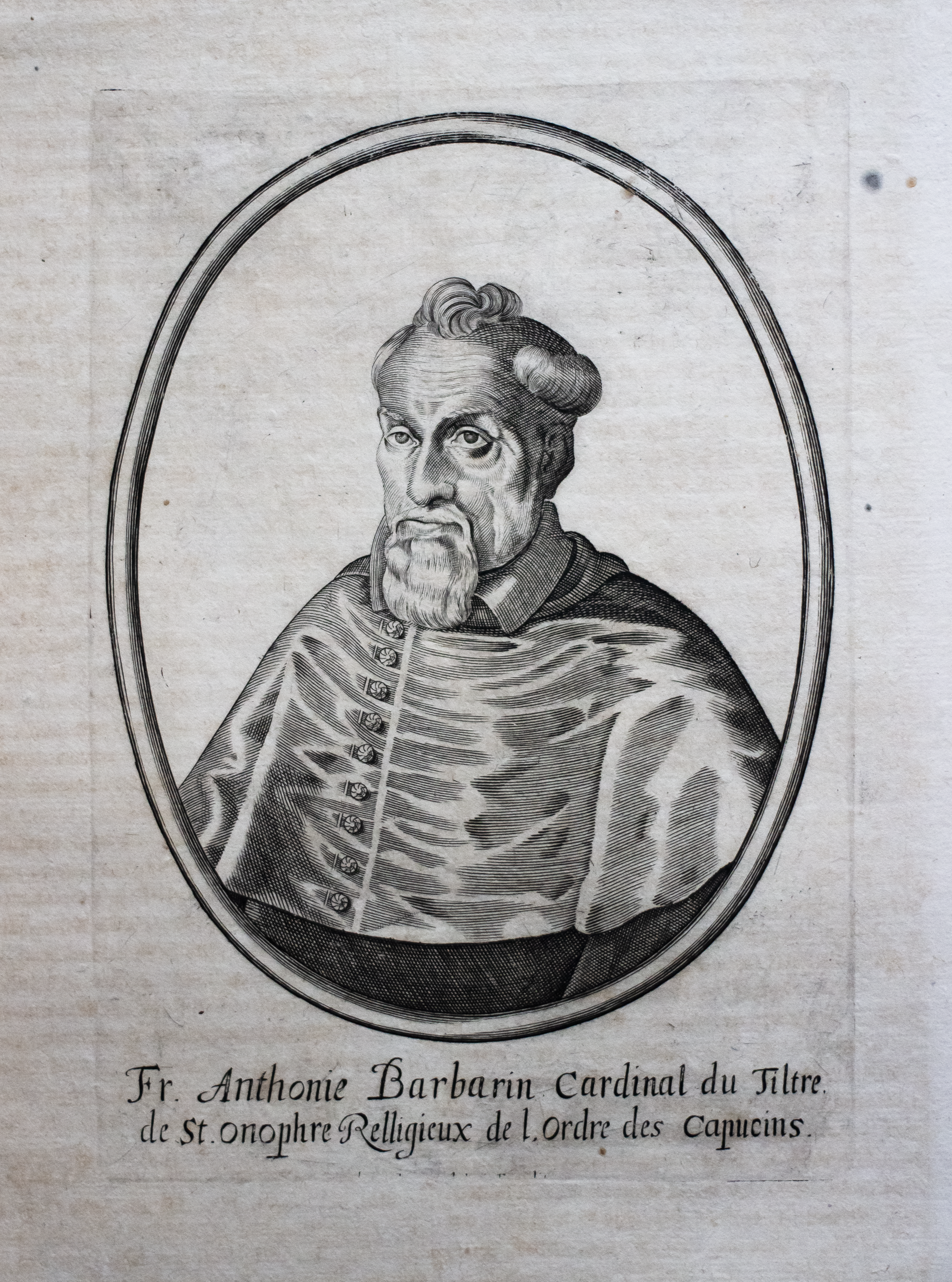
- Portrait of Cardinal Antonio Marcello Barberini, OFMCap. Engraving by Matthaeus Merian, published in Frankfurt am Main, 1650.
- Church: Roman Catholic Church
- Previous posts: Cardinal-Priest of San Pietro in Vincoli (1637-1642); Secretary of the Congregation for the Universal Inquisition (1629-1633); Bishop of Senigallia (1625-1628); Cardinal-Priest of Sant'Onofrio (1624-1637)

Orders
- Consecration: 2 February 1625 by Laudivio Zacchia
- Created cardinal: 7 October 1624 by Urban VIII

Personal details
- Born: 18 November 1569 Florence, Grand Duchy of Tuscany
- Died: 11 September 1646 (aged 76) Rome, Papal States

Antonio Marcello Barberini, OFMCap (18 November 1569 – 11 September 1646) was an Italian cardinal and the younger brother of Maffeo Barberini, later Pope Urban VIII. He is sometimes referred to as Antonio the Elder to distinguish him from his nephew Antonio Barberini.

== Biography ==
Born Marcello Barberini in Florence 1569 into the Barberini family, he entered the Order of Capuchins in 1585. In 1592, he changed his baptismal name to Antonio.

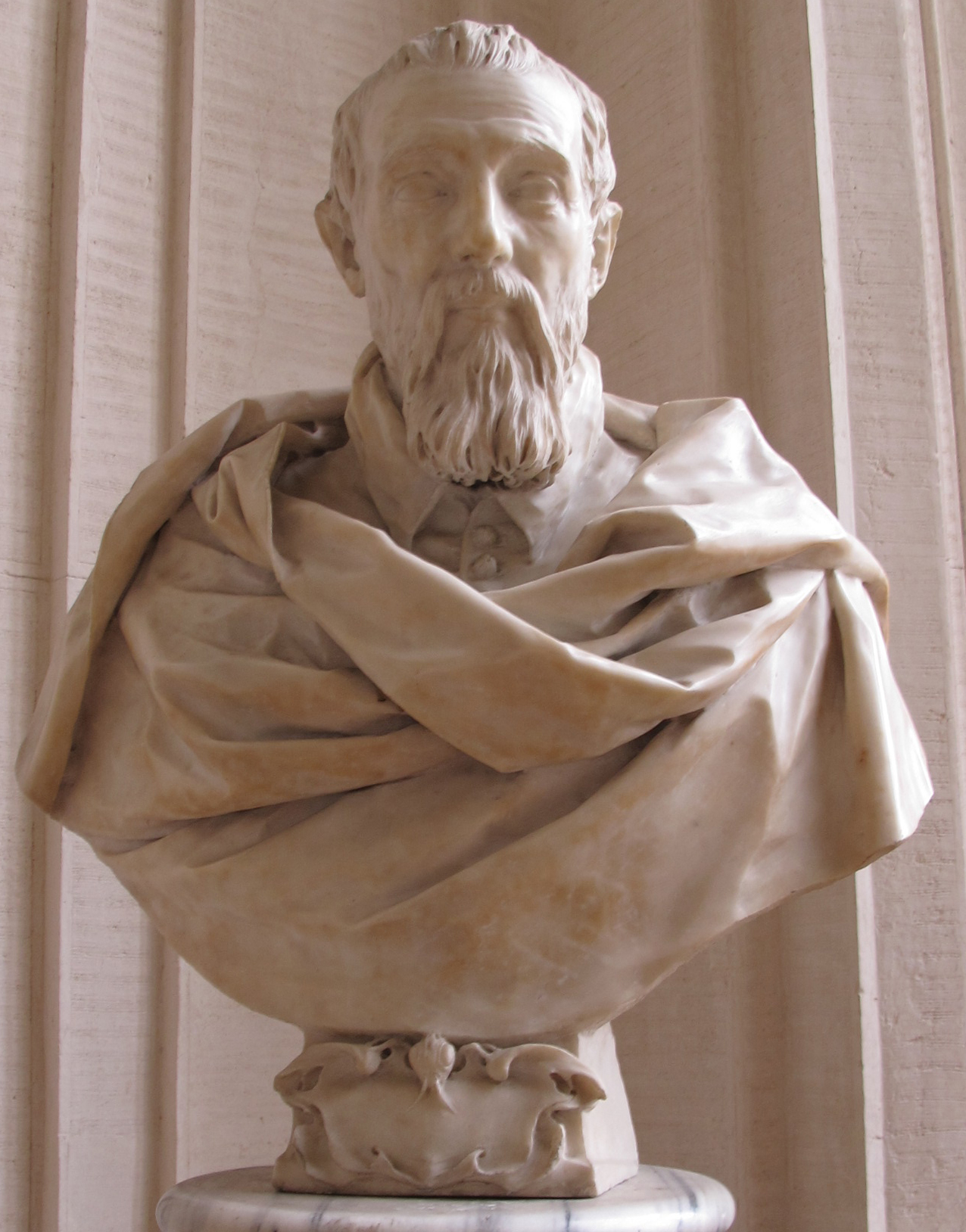
Bust of Antonio Barberini by Bernini.

He served as a priest until the election of his brother Maffeo to the papal throne as Pope Urban VIII in 1623. He traveled to Rome with a group of Capuchin brothers to serve his brother and was elevated to cardinal in 1624.

On 26 January 1625, he was appointed Bishop of Senigallia. On 2 February 1625, he was consecrated bishop by Laudivio Zacchia, Bishop of Corneto e Montefiascone, with Antonio Díaz (bishop), Bishop of Caserta, and Lorenzo Azzolini, Bishop of Ripatransone, serving as co-consecrators.

Later, he was appointed Grand Inquisitor of the Roman Inquisition between 1629 and 1633, Librarian of the Holy Roman Church between 1633 and 1646 and Major Penitentiary between 1633 and 1646. He served as the Camerlengo of the Sacred College of Cardinals twice. He participated in the papal conclave of 1644 which elected his brother's successor, Pope Innocent X. After the Wars of Castro, Innocent X launched an investigation into the Barberini family which forced Antonio Barberini's nephews, Francesco Barberini (Senior), Antonio Barberini (Antonio the Younger) and Prince Taddeo Barberini, into exile.

Barberini died in Rome, at the age of 77 and was buried at the Santa Maria della Concezione dei Cappuccini which he helped to found.

== Episcopal succession ==
Episcopal succession of Antonio Marcello Barberini

While bishop, he was the principal consecrator of:

- Bartolomeo Giustiniani, Bishop of Avellino e Frigento (1626);
- Giovanni Delfino, Bishop of Belluno (1626);
- Benedetto Landi, Bishop of Fossombrone (1628);
- Giovanni Tommaso Malloni (Mallono), Bishop of Šibenik (1628);
- Pietro Carpegna, Bishop of Gubbio (1629);
- Pietro Bonaventura, Bishop of Cesena (1629);
- Urbano Felicio, Bishop of Policastro (1629);
- Girolamo Parisani, Bishop of Polignano (1629);
- Luca Castellini, Bishop of Catanzaro (1629);
- Marcantonio Bragadin (cardinal), Bishop of Crema (1629);
- Gaspar de Borja y Velasco, Cardinal-Bishop of Albano (1630);
- Arcasio Ricci, Bishop of Gravina di Puglia (1630);
- Sigismondo Taddei, Bishop of Bitetto (1631);
- Carlo Antonio Ripa, Bishop of Mondovi (1632);
- Ippolito Franconi, Bishop of Nocera de' Pagani (1632);
- Giovanni Battista Pontano (Montano), Bishop of Oppido Mamertina (1632);
- Pietro Niccolini, Archbishop of Florence (1632);
- Cesare Raccagna, Bishop of Città di Castello (1632);
- Marco Antonio Cornaro, Bishop of Padua (1632);
- Amico Panici, Bishop of Sarsina (1632);
- Girolamo Colonna, Archbishop of Bologna (1632);
- Marco Gradenigo, Patriarch of Aquileia (1633);
- Lorenzo Massimi, Bishop of Marsi (1633);
- Francesco Gonzaga, Bishop of Cariati e Cerenzia (1633);
- Honoratus Caetani, Titular Patriarch of Alexandria (1633);
- Faustus Poli, Titular Archbishop of Amasea (1633);
- Torquato Perotti, Bishop of Amelia (1633);
- Agostino Oreggi (Oregius), Archbishop of Benevento (1633);
- Benedetto Ubaldi, Bishop of Perugia (1634);
- Francesco Maria Merlini, Bishop of Cervia (1635);
- Alessandro Cesarini (iuniore), Bishop of Viterbo e Tuscania (1636);
- Antonio Tornielli, Bishop of Novara (1637);
- Girolamo Lanfranchi, Bishop of Cava de' Tirreni (1637);
- Bernardino Scala, Bishop of Bisceglie (1637);
- Marcantonio Franciotti, Bishop of Lucca (1637);
- Aegidius Ursinus de Vivere, Titular Patriarch of Jerusalem (1641);
- Ascanio Filomarino, Archbishop of Naples (1642);
- Vincenzo Maculani, Archbishop of Benevento (1642);
- Girolamo Verospi, Bishop of Osimo (1642);
- Giulio Gabrielli (seniore), Bishop of Ascoli Piceno (1642);
- Guglielmo Gaddi, Bishop of Bisceglie (1643);
- Giulio Rospigliosi, Titular Archbishop of Tarsus (1644); and
- Nicolò Guidi di Bagno, Titular Archbishop of Athenae (1644).

Catholic Church titles
Preceded by Antaldo degli Antaldi	Bishop of Senigallia; 1625–1628	Succeeded by Desiderio Scaglia
Preceded by Guido Bentivoglio d'Aragona	Camerlengo of the Sacred College of Cardinals; 1632	Succeeded by Lorenzo Campeggi
Preceded by Scipione Borghese	Major Penitentiary; 1633–1646	Succeeded by Orazio Giustiniani
Preceded by Alfonso de la Cueva-Benavides y Mendoza-Carrillo	Camerlengo of the Sacred College of Cardinals; 1636–1637	Succeeded by Luigi Caetani
