= Ermini =

Ermini may refer to:

== Notable people ==
- David Ermini (born 1959), Italian lawyer and politician
- Giuseppe Ermini (1900–1981), Italian politician and legal historian
- Pasquale Ermini (1905–1958), Italian racecar driver, entrepreneur, and car-maker
- Pietro Ermini (1774–1850), Italian painter and engraver

== Enterprises ==
- Officine Ermini Firenze (car manufacturer), a car customiser for racing, and small-scale maker of several original racecar models

== Products ==
- Ermini 357 Sport 1100 and 1500 racecars
- Ermini Seiottosei (686) Barchetta, a 2014 mid-engined (open) sportscar concept
