= Giovanni Tommaso Malloni =

Catholic Bishop of Belluno (1579-1649)

Most Reverend Giovanni Tommaso Malloni
- Bishop of Belluno
- Church: Catholic Church
- Diocese: Diocese of Belluno
- In office: 1634–1649
- Predecessor: Giovanni Delfino
- Successor: Giulio Berlendi
- Previous post: Bishop of Šibenik (1634–1649)

Orders
- Consecration: 13 June 1628 by Antonio Marcello Barberini

Personal details
- Born: 1579 Vicenza, Italy
- Died: 7 February 1649 (age 70) Belluno, Italy

Giovanni Tommaso Malloni, C.R.S. or Giovanni Tommaso Mallono (1579 – 7 February 1649) was a Roman Catholic prelate who served as Bishop of Belluno (1634–1649) and Bishop of Šibenik (1628–1634).

== Biography ==
Giovanni Tommaso Malloni was born in Vicenza, Italy and ordained a priest in the Ordo Clericorum Regularium a Somascha. On 5 June 1628, he was appointed during the papacy of Pope Urban VIII as Bishop of Šibenik. On 13 June 1628, he was consecrated bishop by Antonio Marcello Barberini, Bishop of Senigallia with Lorenzo Azzolini, Bishop of Ripatransone, and Tiberio Cenci, Bishop of Jesi, serving as co-consecrators. On 26 June 1634, he was appointed during the papacy of Pope Urban VIII as Bishop of Belluno. He served as Bishop of Belluno until his death on 7 February 1649.

== External links and additional sources ==
- Cheney, David M. "Diocese of Šibenik (Knin)". Catholic-Hierarchy.org. (for Chronology of Bishops) ^{[self-published]}
- Chow, Gabriel. "Diocese of Šibenik (Croatia)". GCatholic.org. (for Chronology of Bishops) ^{[self-published]}
- Cheney, David M. "Diocese of Belluno-Feltre". Catholic-Hierarchy.org. (for Chronology of Bishops) ^{[self-published]}
- Chow, Gabriel. "Diocese of Belluno-Feltre (Italy)". GCatholic.org. (for Chronology of Bishops) ^{[self-published]}

Catholic Church titles
Preceded by Giovanni Paolo Savio	Bishop of Šibenik; 1628–1634	Succeeded by Alvise Marcello
Preceded by Giovanni Delfino	Bishop of Belluno; 1634–1649	Succeeded by Giulio Berlendi
