= Fabio Albergati =

Italian diplomat and writer

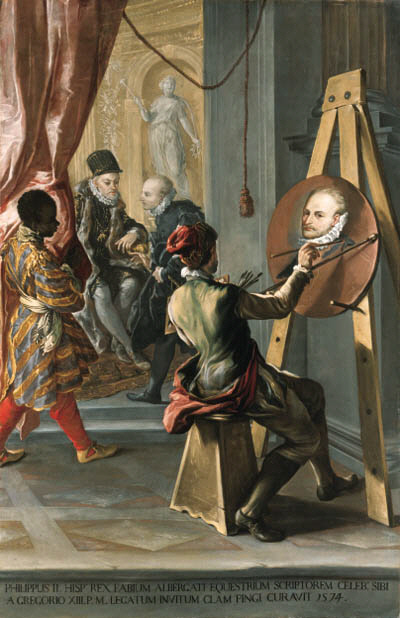
- Fabio Albergati, painting from the Palazzo Albergati, attributed to Giovan Antonio Burrini; imagined scene of Albergati as diplomat meeting Philip II of Spain, with his portrait secretly being taken.
- Born: 1538; Bologna, Papal States
- Died: 15 August 1606 (aged 67–68); Bologna, Papal States
- Occupations: Diplomat; Political philosopher; Jurist; Writer
- Years active: Renaissance
- Board member of: Flaminia Bentivoglio
- Children: 11
- Parent(s): Filippo Albergati and Giulia Albergati (née Bargellini)

Academic background
- Education: University of Bologna
- Influences: Aristotle; Machiavelli; Bodin

Academic work
- Discipline: Political philosophy Ethics
- Notable students: Francesco Maria II della Rovere

Fabio Albergati (1538 – 15 August 1606) was an Italian diplomat, writer, political philosopher, and moralist. Albergati lived during the aftermath of the Protestant Reformation and wrote against the background of religious and ideological conflict. He was a staunch Catholic throughout his life and was highly critical of Jean Bodin and Niccolò Machiavelli.

== Life ==
=== Political career ===
Fabio Albergati was born in Bologna in 1538 of an ancient and noble family. He was born in Bologna, Around 1562, he married Flaminia Bentivoglio, daughter of Count Antonio Bentivoglio. After the election of Gregory XIII to the papacy (1572), he moved to Rome, where he entered the service of Giacomo Boncompagni, Duke of Sora.

He was much esteemed by Pope Sixtus V, and in 1589 was sent as papal Ambassador to the court of Francesco Maria della Rovere, the last Duke of Urbino, who held him in high regard. Albergati was his constant companion whenever the Duke set out on his diplomatic journeys. Innocent IX made his acquaintance while still a cardinal, and in 1591 appointed him Captain of the castle of Perugia. Later, Albergati became consistorial lawyer under the same pope.

=== The Discorsi politici ===
In a letter of 1596 Albergati told the duke Francesco Maria della Rovere that he had asked Cardinal Francisco Toledo for permission to read Jean Bodin (whose works were on the Index of forbidden books). The prelate granted it but urged Albergati to confute Bodin's errors. Therefore, he wrote his unpublished Antibodino, submitted it to Cardinal Pietro Aldobrandini after Toledo's death (1596), and sent a copy to the duke. After substantially enlarging his original manuscript Albergati eventually decided to publish it, first in Rome (1602) and then in Venice (1603), under the title: Dei discorsi politici libri cinque. Nei quali viene riprovata la dottrina di Gio. Bodino, e difesa quella di Aristotele.

=== Last years and death ===
Fabio Albergati died in Bologna on 15 August 1606. A bronze medal was struck in honour of him, bearing on the obverse his effigy, with the words “Fabius Albergati Mon. Canini Marchio;” and on the reverse, falling dew, with the legend “Divisa beatum.”

=== Marriage and children ===
By his wife, the Countess Flaminia, he had six sons and five daughters. One of his daughters, Lavinia, became the wife of the Duke Orazio Ludovisi, the brother of Gregory XV. His son Niccolò embraced the ecclesiastical life and was created cardinal by pope Innocent X on March 6, 1645.

== Ideas ==
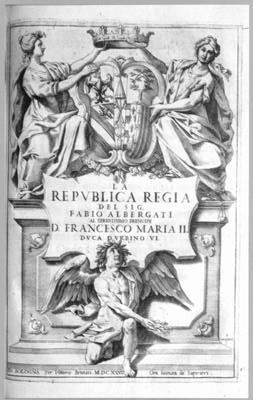
Title page of Albergati's La Republica regia.

Fabio Albergati is best known as an opponent of the French political philosopher Jean Bodin.

Albergati's Dei Discorsi Politici (1602; 1603) is a detailed analysis of Bodin's République (1576). Albergati considers the political community to be natural, and states his preference for monarchy as the ‘best’ of the constitutions described by Aristotle in his Politics, because of its similarity to divine government.

Albergati takes an anti-Machiavellian line in the work, arguing specifically against his idea that religion could be used as a prop to political power. He elaborated the idea of a kinship, a participation in a similar 'unorthodoxy', between Jean Bodin and Niccolò Machiavelli and equated the philosophy of raison d'état with Machiavellianism.

In his work La republica regia (1627), a counter to Machiavelli's Prince, Albergati prefers to reconfirm that, against reason and interest of state, the natural and moral reasons on which political government is based are still valid:

Knowing how to operate on the basis of absolute reason of state, namely to treat equally all states, and republics, is the work of the universal legislator, or let us say architect, or shall we say of the prudent citizen who, familiar with all forms of government, know how to operate in an equal manner for all. And operating according to the particular reason of this, or of that state is a matter for the particular legislator of this or that Republic. Thus, we can deduce that absolute reason of state is the rule, on the basis of which the absolute legislator operates in each state according to its particular form.

— Fabio Albergati, La republica regia, pp. 83-84.

Consequently, if one wants to talk of reason of state as an instrument of government utilized by all sovereigns, it must be strictly combined with that civil prudence which guarantees a solid link - already definitively argued by the doctrine of Aristotle - of honesty to usefulness, of virtue to civil commitment. Certainly, the reference to the Catholic faith is explicit, nevertheless - sustains Albergati - it is natural reason which must guide the work of the governors and the governed; this is the main aim of his work: «the reasons of the modern politician, turned down not on the grounds of faith, but on the grounds of natural reason» (La republica regia, p. 338). Furthermore, in the writing of Albergati, the difficulty of defining the point of equilibrium in the tension between morals and politics, can be found in those passages in which the author confirms the possibility of the prince's carrying out certain dissimilatory practices (La republica regia, pp. 199 and 261).

== Works ==
- Del Modo di ridurre alla Pace le Inimicizie private. Rome: Francesco Zannetti. 1583. This essay on duelling was published in Rome with a dedication to the nephew of the pope, Giacomo Boncompagni, then involved at first hand in the campaign against banditry. Albergati's Trattato went into numerous editions in the course of the Seicento.
- Del Cardinale, Libri III. Bologna. 1589. The treatise is dedicated to the newly elected cardinal, Prince Odoardo Farnese. Albergati's Del Cardinale was to celebrate the excellence of those who combined in their person the prince and the cardinal, uniting virtues of government with elevated spiritual qualities.
- Dei Discorsi Politici Libri cinque, nei quali viene riprobata la Dottrina politica di Bodino, e difesa quella d'Aristotile. Rome: Luigi Zanetti. 1602.
- Le Morali, a treatise on virtues edited by Albergati's son Antonio, Bishop of Bisceglie. Bologna, 1627, fol.
- La Repubblica regia. Bologna: Vittorio Benacci. 1627.
- Ragionamento al Cardinale S. Sisto come nipote di Papa Gregorio. Milan. 1600.

Albergati left several manuscript works, which were preserved in the library of the Duke of Urbino. His complete works were published in Rome by Zanetti in 1573.

== Legacy ==
Albergati was a key figure in the counter-offensive unloosed by Aristotelian political philosophers against Bodin's critique on Aristotle. He is a subtle mind, a closely reasoning logician, too much of a doctrinaire to have any appreciation of the wealth of induction buried under the slags of Bodin's generalizations. He is the first to give a comprehensive critique of Bodin's idea of sovereignty.

Albergati's importance has for a long time escaped the notice of scholars both in Italy and abroad, with the exception of Otto von Gierke, who glimpsed the interest of Albergati's remarks about Bodin's identification of majestas with summa potestas, and of Arnold Wehn, author of the one and only monograph on Albergati which we possess. Wehn admits that even Bodin's most zealous followers have, consciously or unconsciously, walked in the footsteps of Albergati and have subjected his theory of sovereignty to strictures identical or very similar to those produced by the latter.
