= Museum of the Prehistory of Tuscia and of the Rocca Farnese =

Museum in Valentano, Italy

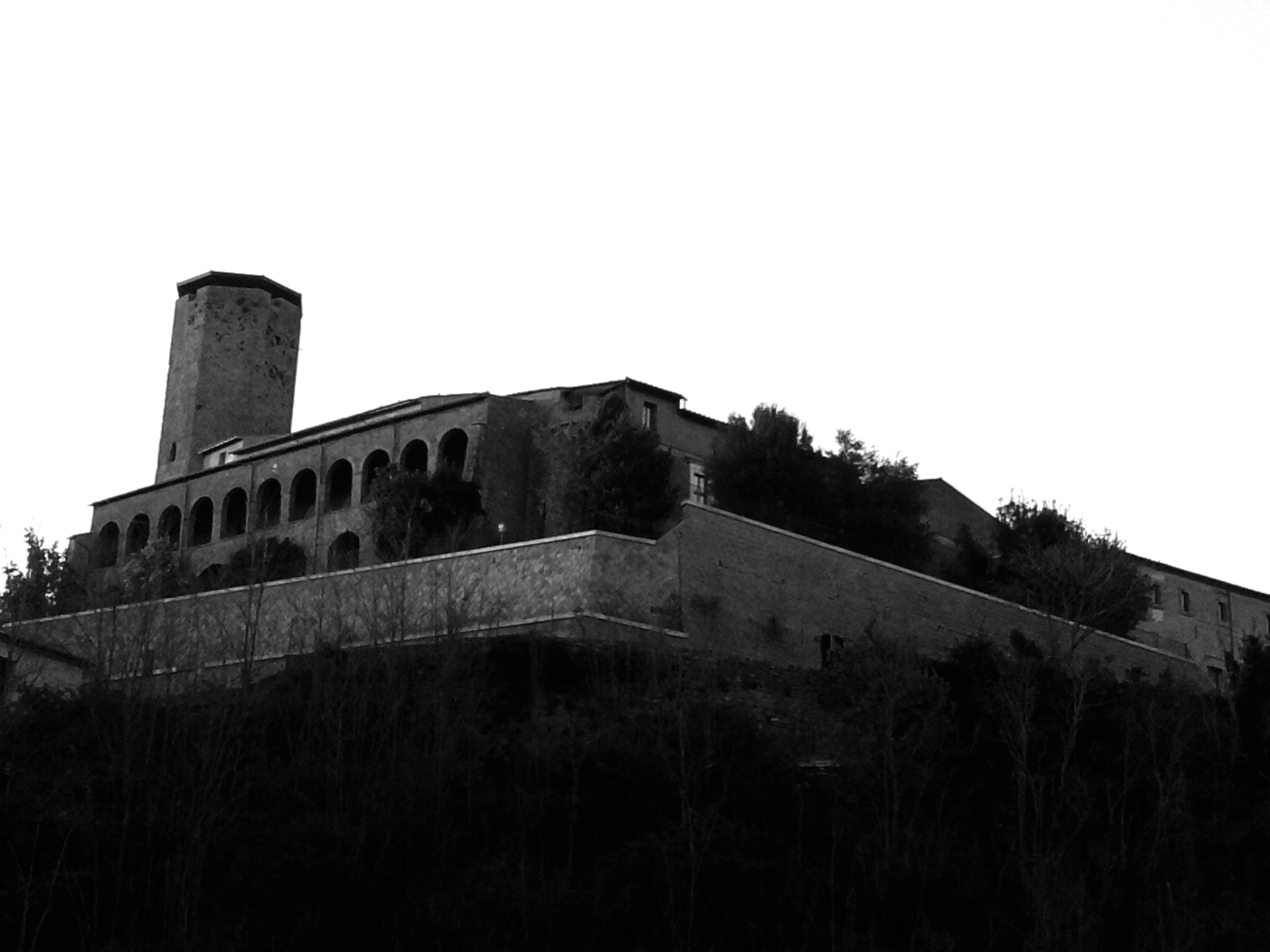
Rocca Farnese, seat of the Museum.

The Museum of the Prehistory of Tuscia and of the Rocca Farnese is a museum in Valentano, northern Lazio, Italy. It was opened in June 1996, the museum is located in the highest part of the village, within the Rocca Farnese itself.

It is divided into different areas located on two floors.

== First floor: Prehistoric, Etruscan and Roman Sections ==
The Prehistoric section has artifacts from Tuscia: Chopper (cutting tools used by early hominids), bifaces, scrapers, retouched tips, brooches, and engraved funeral stones, complemented by an educational department that analyses topics arising from prehistorically finds in central Italy starting from the Lower Paleolithic through to the Neolithic Age and from the copper age to the Bronze Age, ending with a small section on the Iron Age.

Within the Etruscan collection, donated by Monsignor Giovanni D'Ascenzi, there are ceramics from Villanovan, Etruscan, Attic and Corinthian cultures in addition to Phoenician glass paste, and other objects from this period including bronze figures and bone.

The first floor ends with the Roman section, where there are various finds from Valentano e.g., coins, millstones and architectural elements.

== Second floor: Mediaeval, Renaissance and Modern Sections ==
This part of the museum revolves around the history of Rocca Farnese and the development of Valentano from the mediaeval times until the contemporary era, with particular attention to the Farnese family who ruled over the Duchy of Castro.

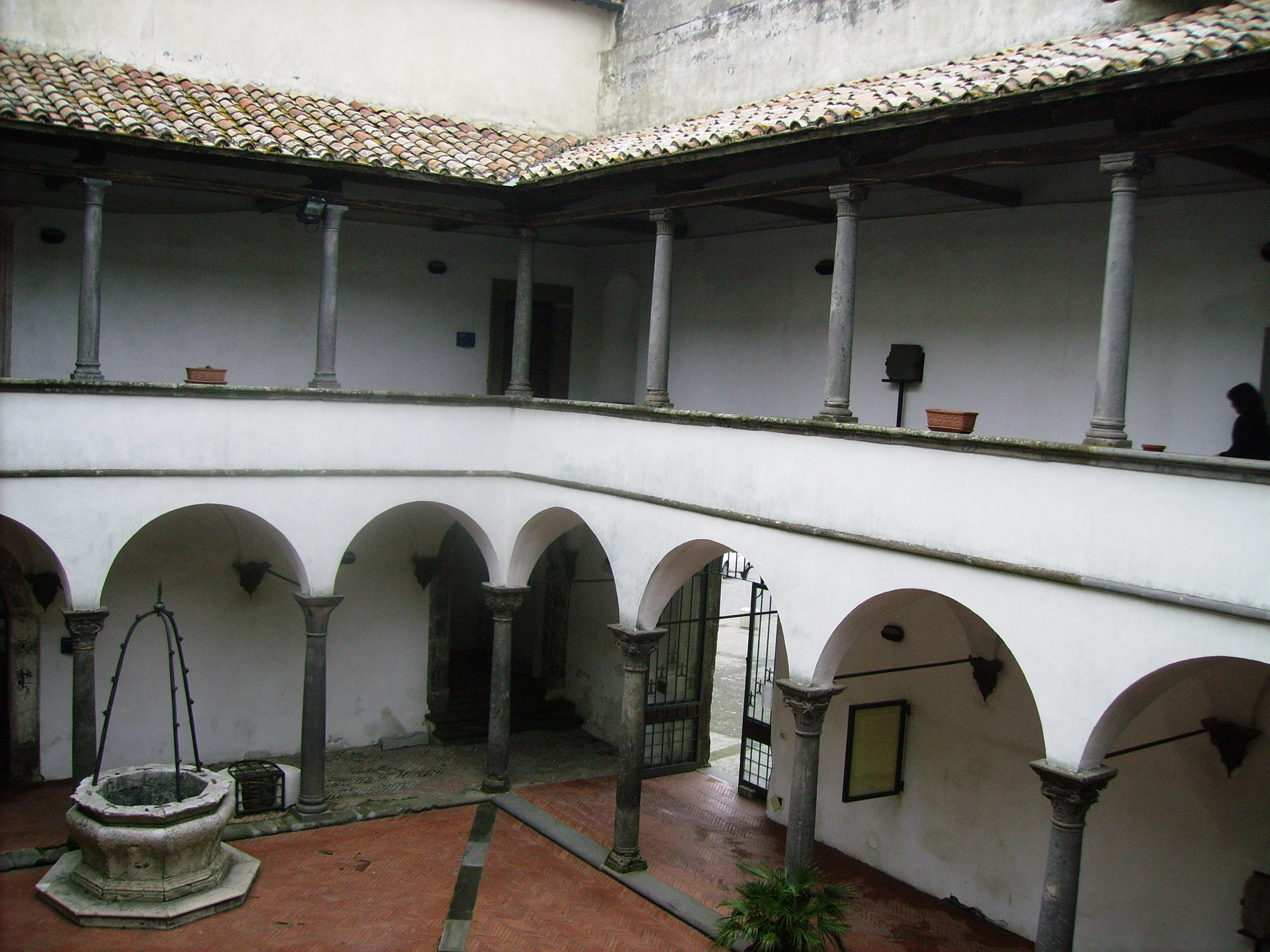
Inner court

The first showcase is dedicated to Lombard domination with findings such as a sax (sword) in iron plus famous ceramics found in small pits surrounding the fort. These areas were used during epidemics when a pit was dug to dispose of the belongings of the deceased. The other exhibits, dedicated to the Farnese family, include a wedding plate bearing the coat of arms of the Farnese/Orsini families on the marriage between Pier Luigi Farnese and Girolama Orsini.

The tour finishes inside the castle with a visit to the top of the octagonal tower, which dominates the town.
