= Ferdinando Pio Rosellini =

Italian mathematician and botanist

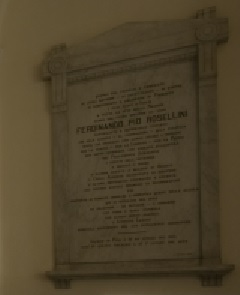
- Memorial in Istituto Leardi (Casale Monferrato)
- Born: 20 April 1814; Pisa, now Italy
- Died: 1 July 1872 (aged 58); Casale Monferrato, Italy
- Education: University of Pisa
- Scientific career
- Fields: Mathematics, Botanics
- Workplaces: Istituto Tecnico Leardi

Ferdinando Pio Rosellini (1814–1872) was an Italian mathematician and botanist.

== Life and work ==
The son of a wealthy family of merchants of Pescia, his elder brother was the Egyptologist Ippolito Rosellini. He studied mathematics at the University of Pisa, and mathematical physics at the University of Florence under Leopoldo Nobili.

From 1836 he was the tutor for the four sons of Giorgio Doria in Genoa; one of them became the known botanist Giacomo Doria, the namesake of the Natural History Museum of Genoa.

In 1844, botanist Giuseppe De Notaris published a genus of fungi, in the family Xylariaceae, called Rosellinia in Ferdinando's honour.

In 1846, three years after the death of his brother Ippolito, he married his widow and adopted his three sons: Eugenio, Angela and Giovanbattista.

In 1848, during the Revolutionary period, he was very active in politics; he was a member of the Circolo Patriottico Milanese, and editor of the political journal La Croce di Savoia.

In 1853 he was appointed director of the Istituto di Commercio e Industria of Turin, founded by Cavour. From 1859 he was director of Istituto Tecnico Leardi in Casale Monferrato where he had as a student a young Vilfredo Pareto. After his death in 1872, his herbarium and manuscripts remained in the 'Istituto'.

In 1921, botanist Edvard August Vainio published Roselliniella a genus of fungi, (in the Hypocreales order). Then in 1986, botanist Rolf Santesson published Rosellinula a genus of fungi, (in the class Dothideomycetes). Lastly, in 1990, Mario Matzer and Josef Hafellner published both Roselliniomyces and Roselliniopsis (two fungi genera from order Sordariales), also named in Ferdinando Pio Rosellini's honour.

The standard author abbreviation Rosell. is used to indicate this person as the author when citing a botanical name.

== Bibliography ==
- Benvenuti, Gino (1967). "Ferdinando Pio Rosellini : patriota ed educatore". Rassegna Periodica di Informazioni del Comune di Pisa (in Italian). 7 (3).
- Coaloa, Roberto (2008). "La classe politica dell'"altro Piemonte" alla vigilia de l'Unita d'Italia". In Valerio Castronovo (ed.). Alessandria: dal Risorgimento all'Unita d'Italia (in Italian). Cassa di Risparmio d'Alessandria. pp. 88–97.
- Giacalone-Monaco, Tommaso (1966). "Ricerche intorno alla giovinezza di Vilfredo Pareto". Giornale degli Economisti e Annali di Economia (in Italian). 25 (1/2): 97–104. ISSN 0017-0097. JSTOR 23239355.
- Pizzarelli, Chiara (2013). "L'istruzione matematica secondaria e tecnica da Boncompagni a Casati 1848-1859: il ruolo della Società d'Istruzione e di Educazione". Rivista di Storia dell'università di Torino (in Italian). 2 (2): 23–60. doi:10.13135/2281-2164/518. ISSN 2281-2164.
