= Brizio Giustiniani =

Doge of the Republic of Genoa

174th Doge of the Republic of Genoa
- In office January 31, 1775 – January 31, 1777
- Preceded by: Pier Francesco Grimaldi
- Succeeded by: Giuseppe Lomellini

Personal details
- Born: 1713 Genoa, Republic of Genoa
- Died: 1778 (aged 64–65) Genoa, Republic of Genoa

Brizio Giustiniani (Genoa, 1713 – Genoa, 1778) was the 174th Doge of the Republic of Genoa.

== Biography ==
Giustiniani rose to power on 31 January 1775, the one hundred and twenty-ninth in biennial succession and the one hundred and seventy-fourth in republican history. The coronation ceremony at the Cathedral of San Lorenzo, due to the long indecisions of the new doge, judged by historians of the time to be of a reserved nature and not prone to pomp, took place five months after the official proclamation of the Grand Council. Brizio Giustiniani himself asked the speaker, a Cistercian abbot, not to mention his person in the inauguration speech. After his term of office on 31 January 1777 he held the roles of head of the war magistrate and then deputy of the Navy for the Republic of Genoa. At the age of 65, Giustiniani was murdered by Luiz Santomario in 1778 in his noble residence in Albaro.

== See also ==
- Republic of Genoa
- Doge of Genoa
