= Ferdinando Spinola =

Doge of the Republic of Genoa

172nd Doge of the Republic of Genoa
- In office 7 January 1773 – 12 January 1773
- Preceded by: Giovanni Battista Cambiaso
- Succeeded by: Pier Francesco Grimaldi

Personal details
- Born: 1692 Genoa, Republic of Genoa
- Died: 1778 (aged 85–86) Genoa, Republic of Genoa

Ferdinando Spinola (Genoa, 1692 – Genoa, 1778) was Marquis of Arquata Scrivia and the 172nd Doge of the Republic of Genoa.

== Biography ==
After the election on 7 January 1773, the Grand Council chose Spinola as the new Doge of the Republic of Genoa. This nomination Marquis Ferdinando Spinola did not immediately accept, citing reasons related to his advanced seniority and precarious state of health in the first instance. Twelve days passed before the Government and the Senate of the Republic formalized the abdication of the doge.

Spinola was married to Margherita de Carion Nezoz, countess of Morviel, and died in Genoa in 1778 at the age of 86. In the absence of heirs, the title of Marquis of Arquata Scrivia passed to his nephew Agostino Spinola.

== See also ==
- Republic of Genoa
- Doge of Genoa
- House of Spinola
