= Valentano =

- Comune
- Comune di Valentano
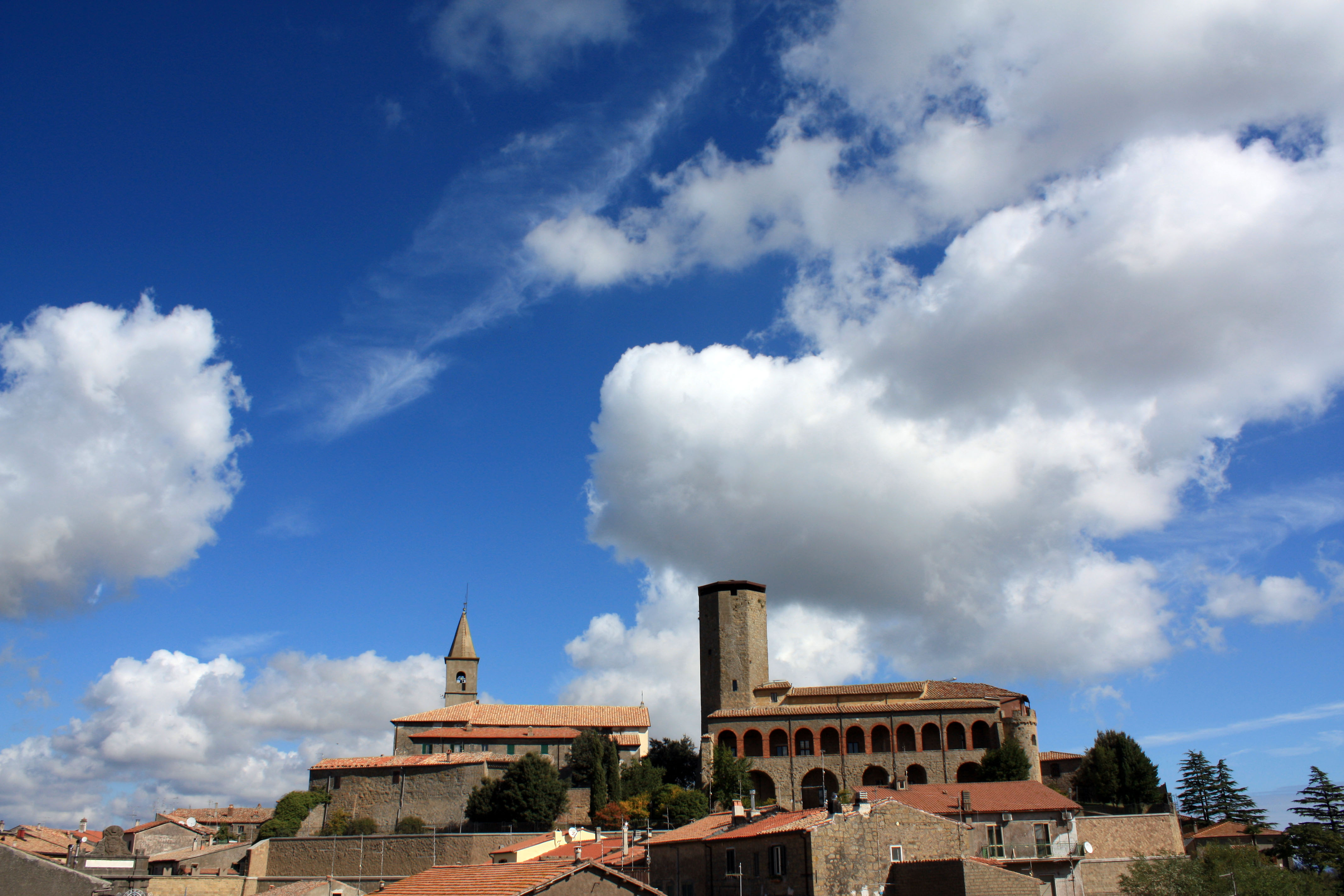
- Rocca Farnese.

- Coat of arms

- Location within Italy Location within Lazio
- Coordinates: 42°33′55″N 11°49′37″E
- Country: Italy
- Region: Lazio
- Province: Viterbo (VT)
- Frazioni: Villa Fontane, Felceti

Government
  - Mayor: Stefano Bigiotti

Area
  - Total: 43.5 km^{2} (16.8 sq mi)
- Elevation: 538 m (1,765 ft)

Population (31 December 2015)
  - Total: 2,868
  - Density: 65.9/km^{2} (171/sq mi)
- Demonym: Valentanesi
- Time zone: UTC+1 (CET)
  - Summer (DST): UTC+2 (CEST)
- Postal code: 01018
- Dialing code: 0761
- Patron saint: St. John the Apostle
- Saint day: December 27
- Website: Official website

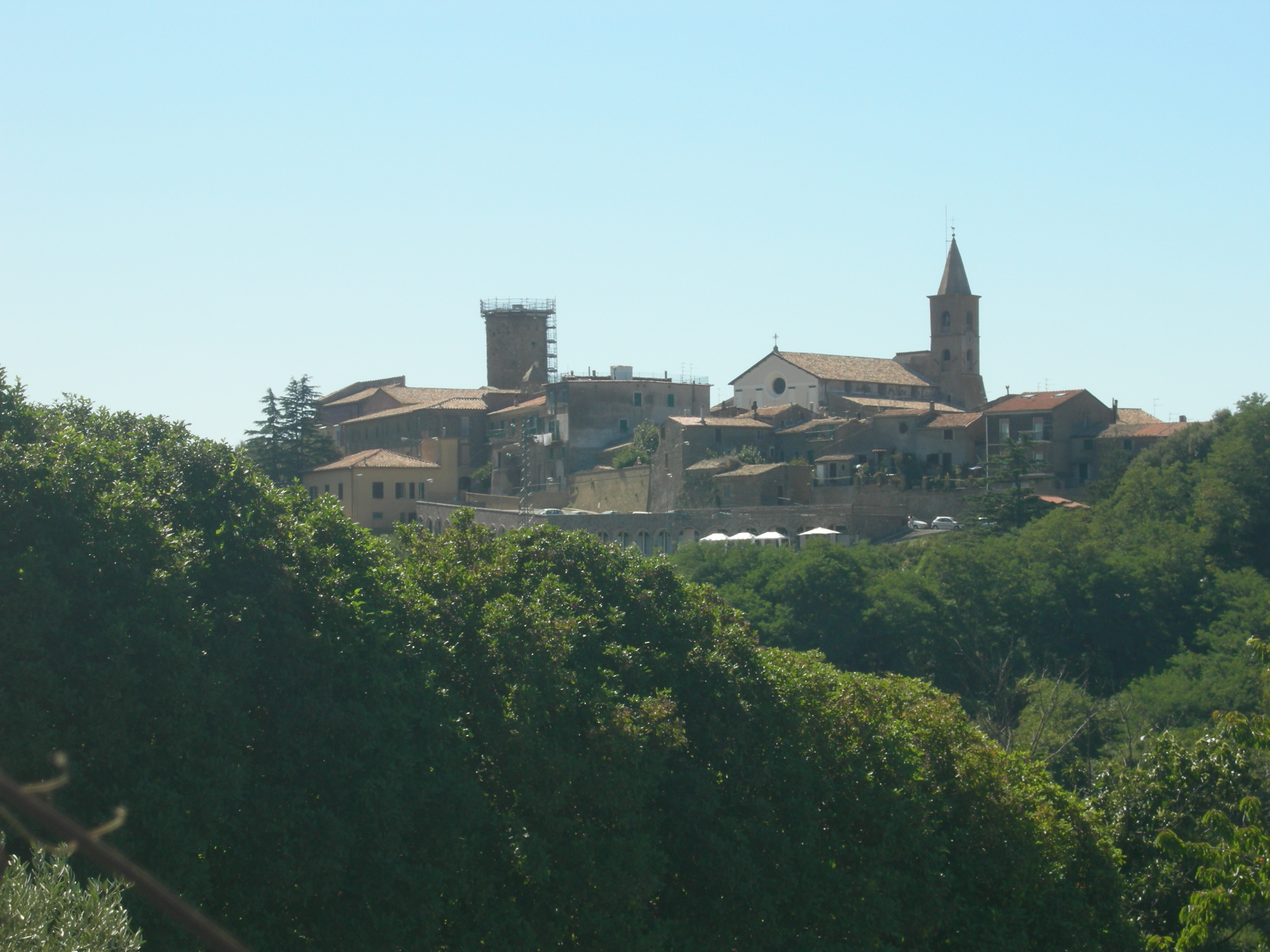
View of Valentano.

Valentano is a town and comune of the province of Viterbo, in the Lazio region of central Italy. It is 33 kilometres (21 mi) from the provincial capital, Viterbo.

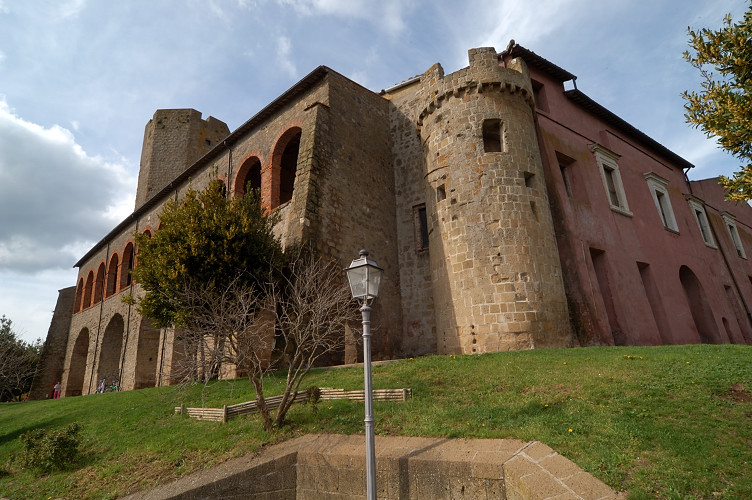
Rocca Farnese in Valentano.

The placename is of uncertain origin. Some identify the town with an Etruscan Verentum, others trace the name to ontano, Italian for alder, since alders cover the slopes of a nearby valley: Valle Ontano becoming Valentano.

== History ==
=== Antiquity and High Middle Ages ===
The town is named for the first time in a manuscript of 813 in the Farfa Register; starting in 844 a "Balentanu" appears in other documents of the abbey of San Salvatore on Mt. Amiata. The land was definitely inhabited in prehistoric times, and important finds in the Lake Mezzano and near Mt. Becco, Mt. Saliette, the Poggi del Mulino and Mt. Starnina seem to confirm the theories of historians, who identify the lake with the Lake of Statonia (Lacus Statoniensis) described by Seneca in his Naturales Quaestiones and by Pliny the Elder (ii.209, xiv.67 and xxxvi.168).

=== The Farnese ===
In the Renaissance period, the town fell under the dominion of the Farnese family: it is to them that Valentano owes its fortress (Rocca) and many of its churches.

In 1649, when the town of Castro, capital of the Duchy of Castro, was destroyed, Valentano became the natural center of the Castrense region and the custodian of its archives.

=== Modern times ===
In June 1944, an artillery shell exploded in the "Portonaccio" gate, killing seven civilians who had taken shelter in it. The gate itself is a witness to the tragedy, since one of its stones is missing, but in 2004 a plaque was placed in the Via Trento e Trieste to commemorate all local victims of World War II.

== Main sights ==
- Palazzo Comunale (Town Hall)
- Porta Magenta, designed by Vignola
- Vitozzi Palace
- Cruciani Palace, birthplace of Paolo Ruffini
- San Martino lookout
- Museum of the Prehistory of Tuscia and of the Rocca Farnese
- Churches:
  - Collegiate church of San Giovanni Evangelista
  - Santa Maria
  - Santa Croce
  - Madonna del Monte
  - Sanctuary of the Madonna della Salute
  - Chiesa dell'Annunziata at Villa Fontane
  - Sancta Maria ad Templum
  - Chiesa dell'Eschio '
  - Church of the Madonna della Pietà (also Madonna dell' Ospedale)

== People ==
- Ranuccio Farnese, Roman Catholic cardinal
- Alessandro Guarnelli
- Paolo Ruffini, 18th century mathematician
- Politician and businessman Jack Ciattarelli's grandparents migrated from Valentano to the US in the early 1900s.

== Events ==
- Good Friday: Procession of the Body of Christ ("Cristo Morto")
- Third Sunday in May: Cedar Fair, instituted by the Farnese in 1461
- August 14–15 Agosto: Feast of the Assumption, with a Plowing Competition.
- Throughout the summer: various events, including the Palio of the Duchy of Castro, a historical pageant.

== Twin towns ==
- Haltwhistle, United Kingdom
- Saint-Méen-le-Grand, France
