= Rosellinula =

Scientific classification
- Kingdom: Fungi
- Division: Ascomycota
- Class: Dothideomycetes
- Subclass: incertae sedis
- Genus: Rosellinula; R. Sant.

Type species
- Rosellinula haplospora (Th. Fr. & Almq. ex Th. Fr.) R. Sant.

Genus of fungi

Rosellinula is a genus of fungi in the class Dothideomycetes. The relationship of this taxon to other taxa within the class is unknown (incertae sedis).

The genus was circumscribed by Rolf Santesson in Syst. Ascom. vol.5 (2) on page 311 in 1986.

The genus name of Rosellinula is in honour of Ferdinando Pio Rosellini (1814–1872), who was an Italian mathematician and botanist.

== Species ==
- Rosellinula frustulosae (Vouaux) R. Sant. (1988)
- Rosellinula haplospora (Th. Fr. & Almq.) R. Sant. (1986)
- Rosellinula kalbii (Hafellner) Hafellner & R.W. Rogers (1988)
- Rosellinula lopadii (Vouaux) D.J. Galloway (2004)

== See also ==
- List of Dothideomycetes genera incertae sedis
