= Bernardino Scala =

Most Reverend Bernardino Scala
- Bishop of Montefeltro
- Church: Catholic Church
- Diocese: Diocese of Montefeltro
- In office: 1643–1667
- Predecessor: Consalvo Duranti
- Successor: Antonio Possenti
- Previous post: Bishop of Bisceglie (1637–1643)

Orders
- Consecration: 25 January 1637 by Antonio Marcello Barberini

Personal details
- Born: 1581 Serra Sant'Abbondio, Italy
- Died: 19 January 1667 (age 86) Montefeltro, Italy

Bernardino Scala (1581 – 19 January 1667) was a Roman Catholic prelate who served as Bishop of Montefeltro (1643–1667) and Bishop of Bisceglie (1637–1643).

== Biography ==
Bernardino Scala was born in Serra Sant'Abbondio, Italy in 1581. On 12 January 1637, he was appointed during the papacy of Pope Urban VIII as Bishop of Bisceglie. On 25 January 1637, he was consecrated bishop by Antonio Marcello Barberini, Cardinal-Priest of Sant'Onofrio, with Faustus Poli, Titular Archbishop of Amasea, and Celso Zani, Bishop Emeritus of Città della Pieve, serving as co-consecrators. On 18 May 1643, he was appointed during the papacy of Pope Urban VIII as Bishop of Montefeltro. He served as Bishop of Montefeltro until his death on 19 January 1667.

== External links and additional sources ==
- Cheney, David M. "Diocese of Bisceglie". Catholic-Hierarchy.org. (for Chronology of Bishops) ^{[self-published]}
- Chow, Gabriel. "Diocese of Bisceglie (Italy)". GCatholic.org. (for Chronology of Bishops) ^{[self-published]}
- Cheney, David M. "Roman Catholic Diocese of San Marino-Montefeltro". Catholic-Hierarchy.org. (for Chronology of Bishops) ^{[self-published]}
- Chow, Gabriel. "Diocese of San Marino-Montefeltro (Italy)". GCatholic.org. (for Chronology of Bishops) ^{[self-published]}

Catholic Church titles
Preceded by Nicola Bellolatto	Bishop of Bisceglie; 1637–1643	Succeeded by Guglielmo Gaddi
Preceded by Consalvo Duranti	Bishop of Montefeltro; 1643–1667	Succeeded by Antonio Possenti
