= Ippolito Rosellini =

Italian egyptologist

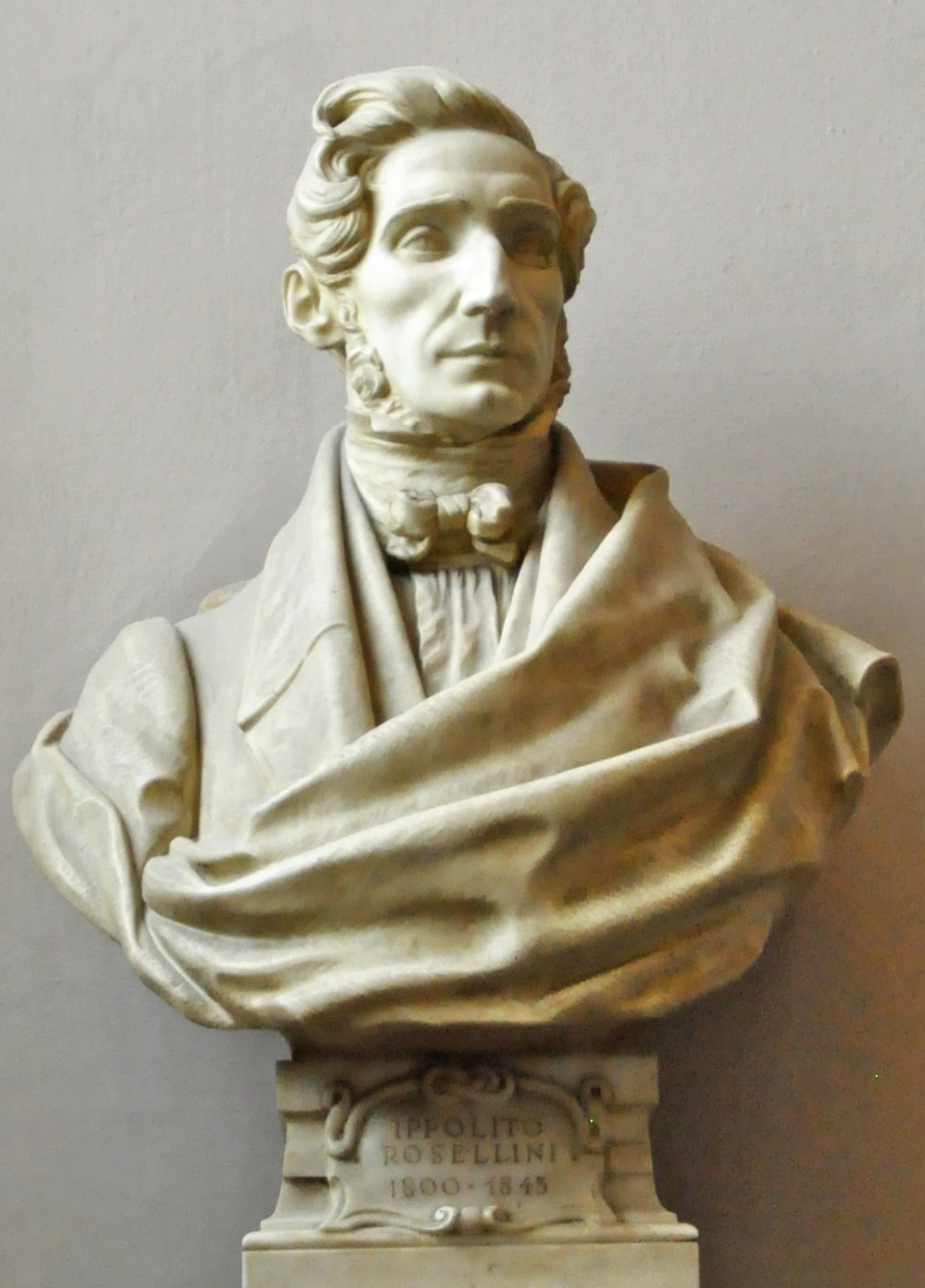
- Bust of Ippolito Rosellini
- Born: 13 August 1800; Pisa, Kingdom of Etruria
- Died: 4 June 1843 (aged 42); Pisa, Grand Duchy of Tuscany
- Occupation: Egyptologist
- Employer: University of Pisa
- Known for: I Monumenti dell'Egitto e della Nubia
- Spouse: Zenobia Cherubini
- Parent(s): Giovan Battista Rosellini; M.Angiola Biagetti
- Relatives: Ferdinando Pio Rosellini (brother)

Academic background
- Education: University of Pisa; University of Bologna
- Academic advisor: Giuseppe Gasparo Mezzofanti

Signature
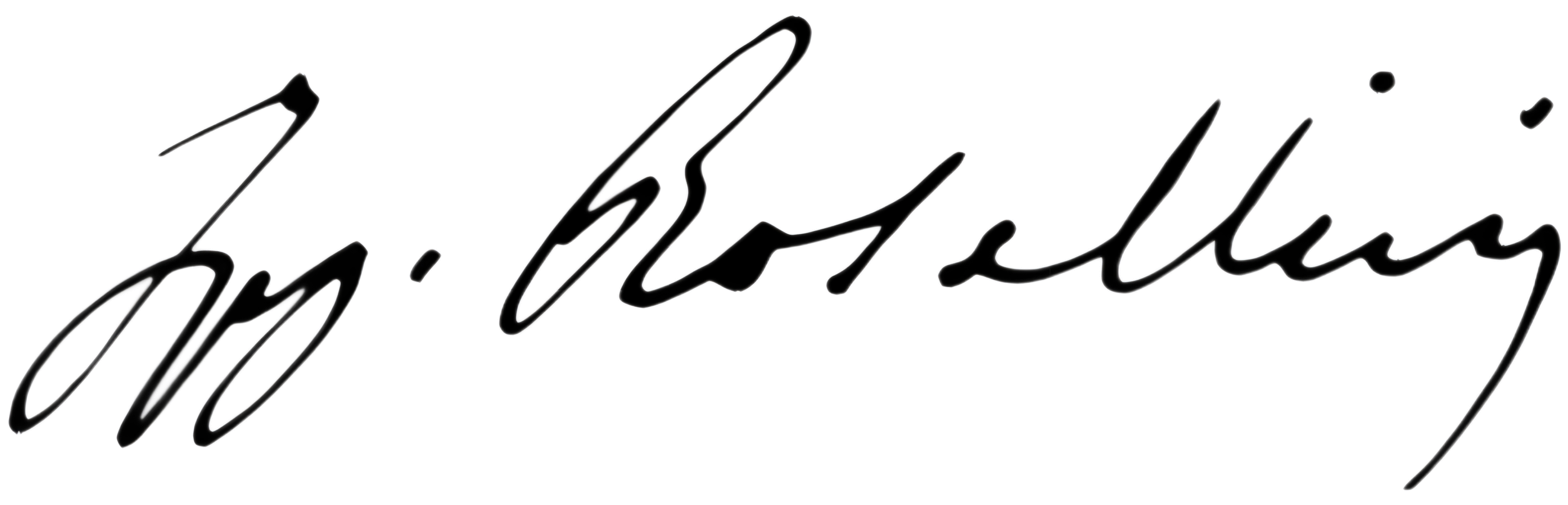

Niccola Francesco Ippolito Baldassarre Rosellini, known simply as Ippolito Rosellini (13 August 1800 – 4 June 1843) was an Italian Egyptologist. A scholar and friend of Jean-François Champollion, he is regarded as the founder of Egyptology in Italy.

== Biography ==
=== Background ===
During the early 19th century, Italian culture experienced a period of 'Egyptomania', brought on by Napoleon's discoveries in Egypt during his campaign there (1798–1801). Several Italian scholars and adventurers, such as Giovanni Belzoni, Bernardino Drovetti, Antonio Lebolo and Giovanni Battista Caviglia, devoted themselves to the emerging field of Egyptology, making outstanding contributions to this new discipline. A philologist by training, Rosellini was among the first and most crucial European scholars to embrace and support Jean-François Champollion's 1822 breakthrough in deciphering Egyptian hieroglyphs. As a follower and close friend, Rosellini validated Champollion’s findings, and they together organized the 1828 Franco-Tuscan Expedition, which successfully applied the new methods in Egypt.

=== Early life and education ===
Ippolito Rosellini was born in Pisa, eldest son of a family originally from Pescia. After completing his studies at the Servite schools in Pisa and Florence, he enrolled at the University of Pisa in 1817. Under the guidance of the orientalist Cesare Malanima, he dedicated himself in particular to the study of Hebrew. After obtaining a degree in theology on 5 June 1821, he moved to Bologna to further his studies in Oriental languages under the renowned linguist Giuseppe Gasparo Mezzofanti. While in Bologna, he formed lasting friendships with the physicist and Etruscologist Francesco Orioli, the engraver Francesco Rosaspina, and the Barnabite scholar Luigi Ungarelli.

In September 1822, Jean-François Champollion published his ground-breaking Mémoire sur les hiéroglyphes phonétiques, which he presented to the Académie des Inscriptions et Belles-Lettres in Paris. This landmark publication announced his successful decipherment of the Egyptian hieroglyphic script, laying the foundations of modern scientific Egyptology. However, it was fiercely contested at the time. Rosellini read an Italian translation of the Mémoire published in the Florentine literary journal Antologia in 1823. Inspired by this reading, Rosellini delved deeper into the topic and quickly became one of Champollion's supporters.

=== Academic career and Franco-Tuscan expedition ===
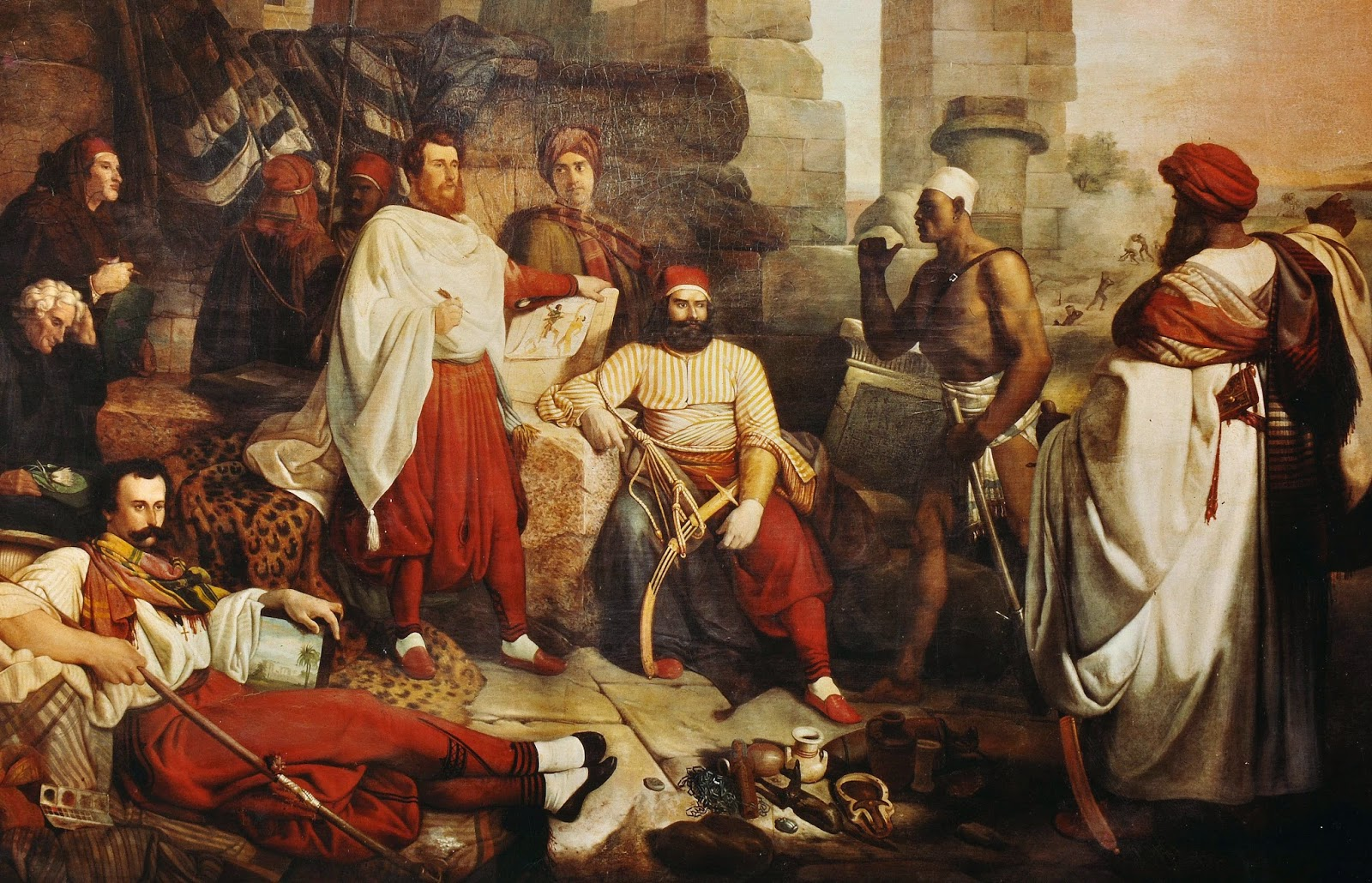
Painting by Giuseppe Angelelli (c. 1836) depicting the members of the Franco-Tuscan expedition. Champollion and Rosellini are at the centre. Champollion is seated with Rosellini standing to his right, holding a sheet depicting a scene from the Battle of Kadesh.

Following the completion of his studies, Rosellini returned to Pisa in 1824. He was initially appointed as a professor of Oriental languages and literature, and subsequently, from autumn 1825, as a professor of Egyptology. His university courses attracted a large audience.

Rosellini published his first works on Egyptology in 1825. In August of that year, he met Champollion, who was on a journey to study important Egyptological collections in Turin, Rome and Florence. The French scholar was in Florence to examine the collection of Giuseppe Nizzoli, the Chancellor of the Austrian Consulate in Egypt, which had recently been purchased by the Grand Duke of Tuscany. The meeting between Champollion and Rosellini marked the beginning of a scientific partnership that would shape the destiny of both men and the emerging discipline. In 1827, Rosellini went to Paris for a year in order to improve his knowledge of the method of decipherment proposed by Champollion. Here, he met and then married Zenobia, daughter of the Italian composer Luigi Cherubini. Ippolito and Zenobia had four children: Ida, Eugenio, Angela and Giovambattista.

Champollion had long aspired to organise an expedition to Egypt with the aim of systematically documenting and translating inscriptions and collecting them directly from monuments. With the help of Rosellini and the endorsement of the Grand Duke of Tuscany Leopold II, he was able to plan an expedition, overcoming the challenges he had encountered in France. The expedition plan, developed by the two scholars and presented to their respective governments in 1827, was swiftly approved in Tuscany. This persuaded the hesitant Charles X of France to provide funding.

The project for the first major international archaeological undertaking involved two parallel commissions: the French commission under Champollion's leadership and the Tuscan commission under Rosellini. The project envisaged surveying monuments and copying all inscriptions in Egypt and Nubia, as well as conducting excavations and purchasing antiquities. The shared scientific and material objectives were outlined for the first time with a remarkably modern vision of the historical and archaeological value of the objects, rather than merely their antiquarian value. The agreement established the complete sharing of the scientific data collected.

The Franco-Tuscan expedition departed from Toulon on 31 July 1828 and remained in Egypt and Nubia until autumn 1829. It included six French and six Tuscan scholars, artists, and scientists, including botanist Giuseppe Raddi, painters Giuseppe Angelelli and Nestor L'Hôte, and doctor/artist Alessandro Ricci. Champollion, Rosellini and their companions crossed the Nile from Alexandria to Abu Simbel and the Second Cataract. On 1 January 1829, they reached Wadi Halfa and returned north, spending more than six months in Thebes, the capital of Egypt during the Middle Kingdom and New Kingdom eras. Returning to Marseille on the Côte d'Azur, the members of the expedition had to spend a month in quarantine on the ship before being able to continue on towards Paris.

The Franco-Tuscan expedition laid the foundations of modern Egyptology, documenting hundreds of monuments and texts. The material collected by the Tuscan Commission alone, now preserved in the University Library of Pisa, includes around 1,400 original drawings by the expedition's artists and 14 manuscript volumes containing Rosellini's observations, copies of texts and various notes, some of which are still unpublished. The Commission also assembled two separate collections of antiquities: one for the Louvre (102 pieces) and one for the Uffizi (1,878 pieces, which are now housed in the Egyptian Museum of Florence).

=== Return to Europe and last years ===
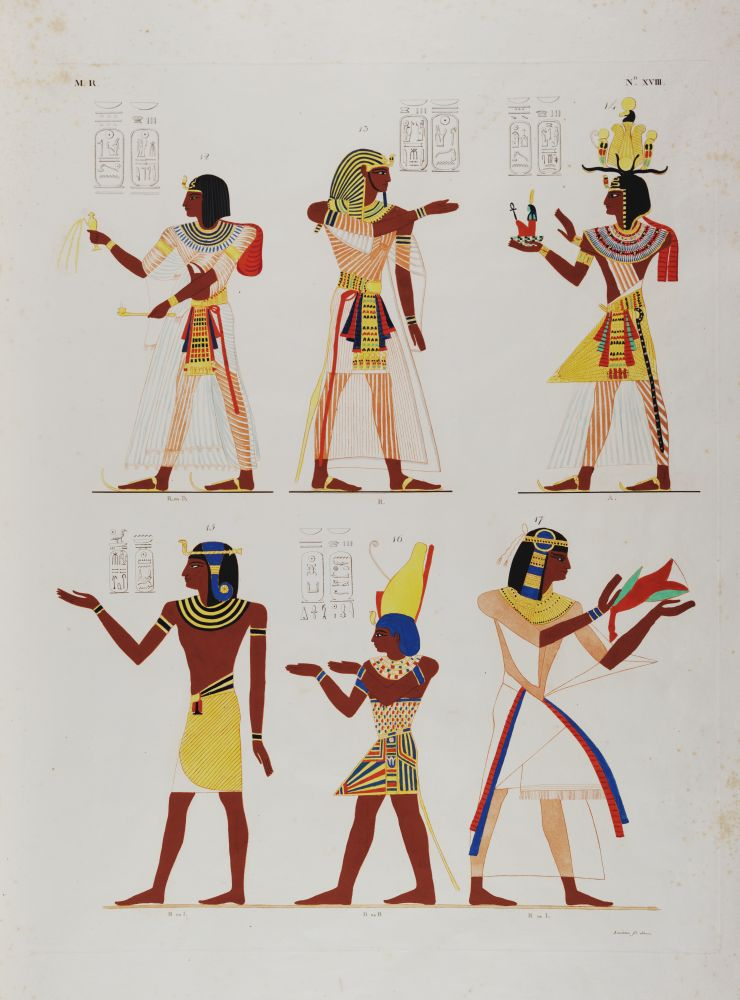
Page from I Monumenti dell'Egitto e della Nubia showing depictions of kings of Egypt, from an original at the Bodleian Libraries

Rosellini and Champollion agreed to publish the result of their researches in Egypt jointly, dividing the vast amount of material between them. However, the project never materialised: on 4 March 1832, Champollion died, leaving Rosellini, his sole successor and spiritual heir, with the entire burden of the work. Despite his profound grief over Champollion's death and the overwhelming responsibility, Rosellini completed the work within twelve years. Between 1832 and 1843 he exposed the results of the expedition in his most famous work, I Monumenti dell'Egitto e della Nubia, composed of three parts and nine volumes for a total of 3,300 text pages and 395 illustrated plates.

The arduous and expensive work was hindered not only by the hostility of numerous colleagues and scholars, including the relentless hostility of the decipherer's older brother, Jacques-Joseph Champollion, but also by various issues. The government had only lent Rosellini the estimated sum, and unforeseen financial difficulties exacerbated the situation. Over time, the Grand Duke himself seemed to gradually become indifferent and distant, perhaps due to the delays in publication. Since 1836, Rosellini's health started to decline possibly due to malaria, which ultimately led to his death on 4 June 1843 in Pisa. He was buried in the Camposanto Monumentale. All his papers were donated to the library of the University of Pisa, while the last volume of the Monumenti was published posthumously in 1844. Three years after his death, his widow married his brother Ferdinando Pio, a mathematician, who adopted their three sons.

== Assessment ==
Rosellini's work was recognised by his contemporaries as a milestone in the nascent field of Egyptology. The renowned German Egyptologist, Karl Richard Lepsius, who had studied under Rosellini in Pisa, wrote in his renowned 'Lettre à M. le Professeur H. Rosellini', published in his 1837 work on the Hieroglyphic Alphabet, that Champollion's Grammaire Égyptienne would "forever be the foundational text of Egyptian philology, just as the Description des Monuments de l'Égypte et de la Nubie would be for Egyptian archaeology, understood in the broadest sense of the term".

== Selected works ==
- 1826. Di un bassorilievo egiziano della imp. e r. Galleria di Firenze
- 1830. Breve notizia degli oggetti di antichità egiziane riportate dalla Spedizione letteraria toscana in Egitto e nella Nubia, eseguita negli anni 1828-29 ed esposti al pubblico nell'Accademia delle arti e mestieri in S. Caterina
- 1832-44. I Monumenti dell'Egitto e della Nubia, disegnati dalla spedizione scientifico-letteraria Toscana in Egitto: distribuiti in ordine di materie, interpretati ed illustrati
  - 1832. Parte I. Monumenti storici, tomo I
  - 1833. Parte I. Monumenti storici, tomo II
  - 1834. Parte II. Monumenti civili, tomo I
  - 1834. Parte II. Monumenti civili, tomo II
  - 1836. Parte II. Monumenti civili, tomo III
  - 1838. Parte I. Monumenti storici, tomo III, parte I
  - 1839. Parte I. Monumenti storici, tomo III, parte II
  - 1839. Parte I. Monumenti storici, tomo IV
  - 1841. Parte I. Monumenti storici, tomo V
  - 1844 (posthumous). Parte III. Monumenti di culto, tomo unico
- 1837. Elementa Linguae Aegyptiacae, vulgo Copticae (ed. by L.M. Ungarelli).

== Bibliography ==
- Bardelli, Giuseppe (1843). Biografia del professore Ippolito Rosellini. Florence: Tipografia Piatti.
- Chisholm, Hugh, ed. (1911). "Rosellini, Ippolito" . Encyclopædia Britannica. Vol. 23 (11th ed.). Cambridge University Press. pp. 734–735.
- Dawson, Warren R. (1951). Who Was Who in Egyptology. London: Harrison & sons (reprint 1972).
- Benvenuti, Gino; Benvenuti, Gianfranco (1987). Vita di Ippolito Rosellini padre dell'egittologia italiana. Pisa: Giardini. ISBN 978-8842713777.
- Edda Bresciani; Sergio Donadoni; Maria Cristina Guidotti; Enricheta Leospo, eds. (1993). L'antico Egitto di Ippolito Rosellini. Novara: Istituto geografico de Agostini.
- Marilina Betrò, ed. (2010). Ippolito Rosellini and the Dawn of Egyptology: Original Drawings and Manuscripts of the Franco-Tuscan Expedition to Egypt (1828-29) from the Biblioteca Universitaria di Pisa. London: Golden House Publications. ISBN 978-1906137267.
- Guidotti, Maria Cristina (2010). "Ippolito Rosellini e la Spedizione franco-toscana" (PDF). Ricerche di Storia dell'Arte. 1 (1): 43–47. doi:10.7374/71484.
- Marilina Betrò; Gianluca Miniaci, eds. (2013). Talking along the Nile. Ippolito Rosellini, travellers and scholars of the 19th century in Egypt. Pisa: Pisa University Press. ISBN 978-8867411283.
- Betrò, Marilina (2017). "ROSELLINI, Ippolito". Dizionario Biografico degli Italiani (in Italian). Vol. 88: Robusti–Roverella. Rome: Istituto dell'Enciclopedia Italiana. ISBN 978-88-12-00032-6.
