= Pier Francesco Grimaldi =

Doge of the Republic of Genoa

173rd Doge of the Republic of Genoa
- In office 26 January 1773 – 26 January 1775
- Preceded by: Ferdinando Spinola
- Succeeded by: Brizio Giustiniani

Personal details
- Born: 12 August 1715 Genoa, Republic of Genoa
- Died: 4 January 1791 (aged 75) Genoa, Republic of Genoa

Pier Francesco Grimaldi (Genoa, 12 August 1715 - Genoa, 4 January 1791) was the 173rd Doge of the Republic of Genoa.

== Biography ==
Grimaldi became doge when Ferdinando Spinola renounced his position of doge. The election took place on 26 January 1773. The suppression of the Society of Jesus was imposed during his Dogate, to which the doge and a large part of the Genoese aristocracy were in favor. For this reason Pier Francesco Grimaldi delayed the execution of this order, in agreement with the Jesuit archbishop of Genoa. With pontifical permission he also restricted the right of immunity of churches for outlaws. The dogate ended on 26 January 1775, and Grimaldi continued to work for the Republic. He died in 1791.

== See also ==
- Republic of Genoa
- Doge of Genoa
