= Giuseppe Angelelli =

Italian painter

Giuseppe Angelelli (Coimbra, Portugal, 7 December 1803 – Florence, 4 November 1844) was an Italian painter.

== Biography ==
While born in Portugal, his parents were Italian. They traveled widely to Brazil (1807), Peru (1816), France, and England. Only in 1818 did Angelelli move to Florence to study in the Academy of Fine Arts of Florence under Pietro Benvenuti and Pietro Ermini. In 1827, he traveled to Egypt with a Franco-Tuscan expedition directed by the archeologists Ippolito Rosellini and Jean-François Champollion; where he made many drawings later engraved by in a book by Rosellini: I monumenti dell'Egitto e della Nubia, Atlante, 3 volumes, Pisa (1832, 1834, 1844). He also painted portraits.

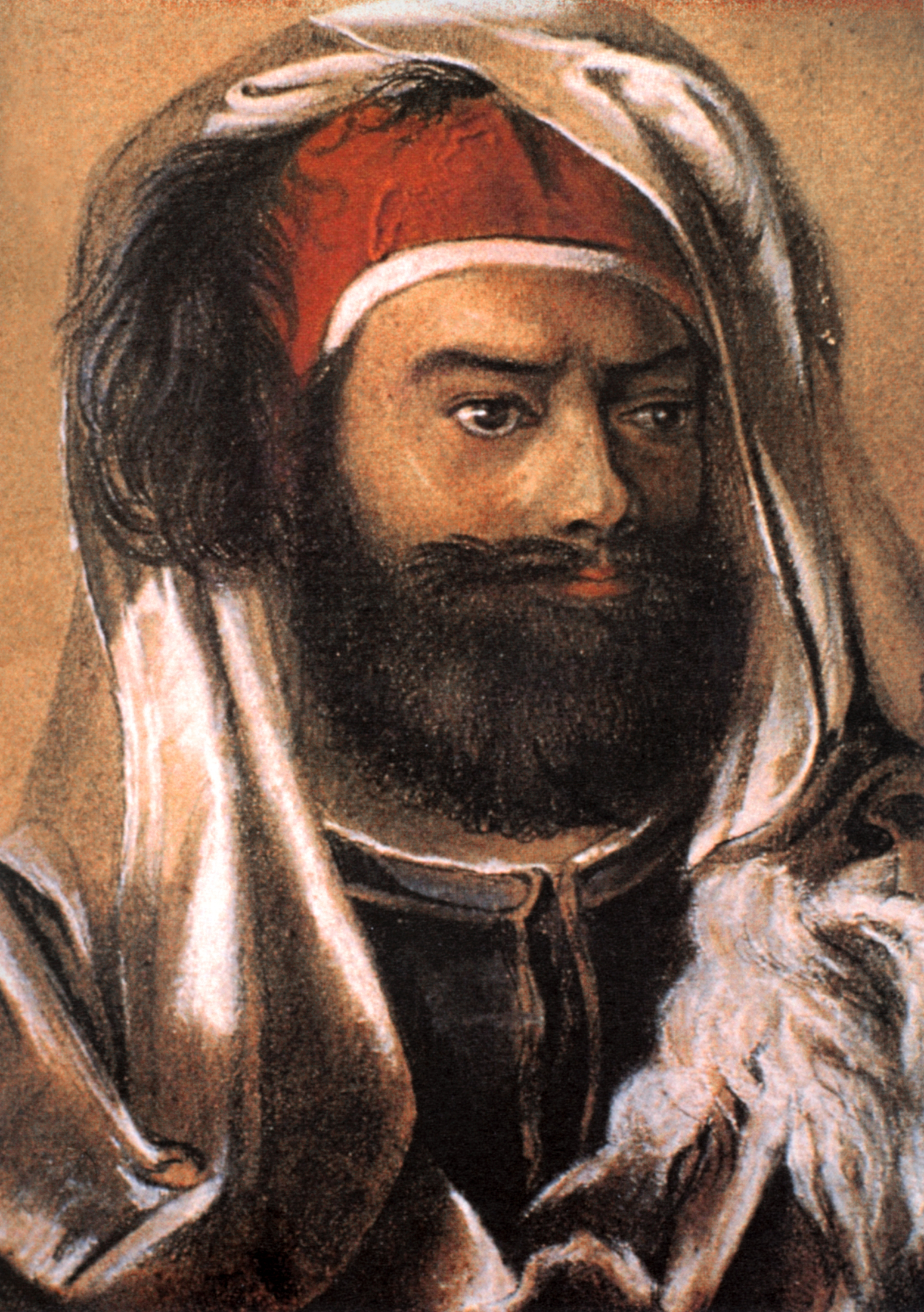
Portrait of Jean-François Champollion, a member of the Franco-Tuscan expedition.

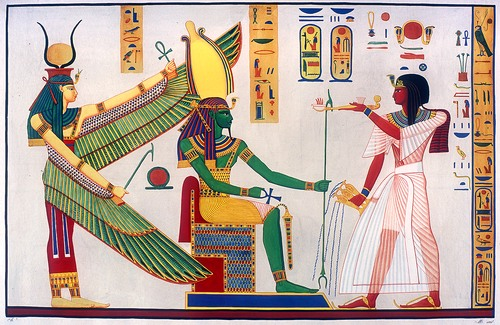
Rameses III censing and libating

Upon returning to Florence, the Grand Duke commissioned Angelelli to paint the members of the Franco-Tuscan expedition to the ruins of Thebes. Angelelli also painted African landscapes and made portraits, including that of his wife and self-portraits.

== Commons ==
- Belli Barsali, Isa (1961). "ANGELELLI, Giuseppe". Dizionario Biografico degli Italiani (in Italian). Vol. 3: Ammirato–Arcoleo. Rome: Istituto dell'Enciclopedia Italiana. OCLC 883370.
