= Giovanni Battista Cambiaso =

Doge of the Republic of Genoa

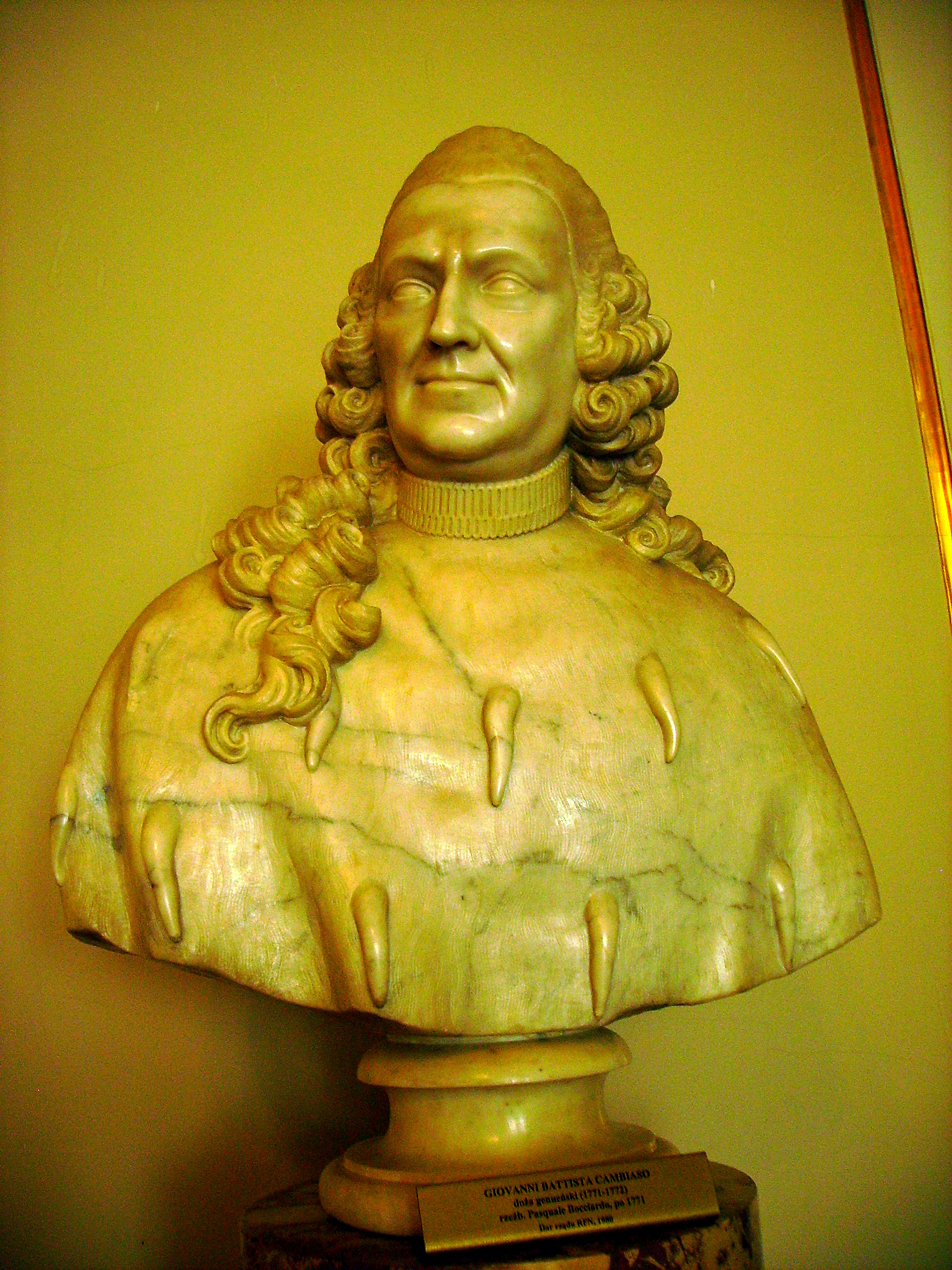

171st Doge of the Republic of Genoa
- In office April 16, 1771 – December 23, 1772
- Preceded by: Giovanni Battista Negrone
- Succeeded by: Ferdinando Spinola

Personal details
- Born: July 19, 1711 Genoa, Republic of Genoa
- Died: December 23, 1772 (aged 61) Genoa, Republic of Genoa

Giovanni Battista Cambiaso (Genoa, July 19, 1711 - Genoa, December 23, 1772) was the 171st Doge of the Republic of Genoa.

== Biography ==
On 16 April 1771 Cambiaso was elected doge with 276 votes out of 366 and on 8 February 1772 the sumptuous coronation ceremony took place, on this occasion the Arcadians wanted to celebrate it with a poetic Serto including various sonnets and songs. Cambiaso, still in office, died suddenly from unknown reasons on December 23, 1772, at 61 years old.

== See also ==
- Republic of Genoa
- Doge of Genoa
