= Giovanni Delfino (bishop of Belluno) =

Italian Roman Catholic prelate and bishop

Most Reverend Giovanni Delfino
- Bishop of Belluno
- Church: Catholic Church
- Diocese: Diocese of Belluno
- In office: 1626–1634
- Predecessor: Panfilo Persico
- Successor: Giovanni Tommaso Malloni

Orders
- Consecration: 22 February 1626 by Antonio Marcello Barberini

Personal details
- Born: 1589 Venice, Republic of Venice
- Died: 1651 (age 70) Venice, Republic of Venice

Giovanni Delfino (died 1651) was a Roman Catholic prelate who served as Bishop of Belluno (1626–1634).

== Biography ==
Giovanni Delfino was born in 1589. On 9 February 1626, Giovanni Delfino was appointed during the papacy of Pope Urban VIII as Bishop of Belluno. On 22 February 1626, he was consecrated bishop by Antonio Marcello Barberini, Cardinal-Priest of Sant'Onofrio. He served as Bishop of Belluno until his resignation in 1634. He died in 1651.

== Episcopal succession ==
While bishop, he was the principal co-consecrator of:

- Hector de Monte, Bishop of Termoli (1626);
- Nicolaus de Georgiis, Bishop of Hvar (1635); and
- Alvise Marcello, Bishop of Šibenik (1635).

== External links and additional sources ==
- Cheney, David M. "Diocese of Belluno-Feltre". Catholic-Hierarchy.org. (for Chronology of Bishops) ^{[self-published]}
- Chow, Gabriel. "Diocese of Belluno-Feltre (Italy)". GCatholic.org. (for Chronology of Bishops) ^{[self-published]}

Catholic Church titles
Preceded by Panfilo Persico	Bishop of Belluno; 1626–1634	Succeeded by Giovanni Tommaso Malloni
