= Pietro Pedroni =

Italian painter

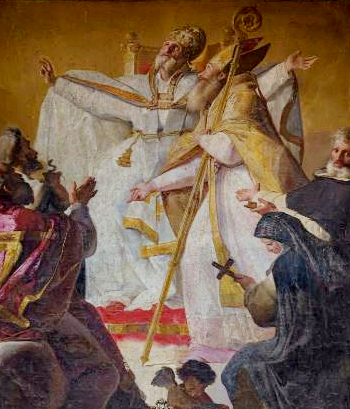
Pope Pius V and Saint Bernard (detail)

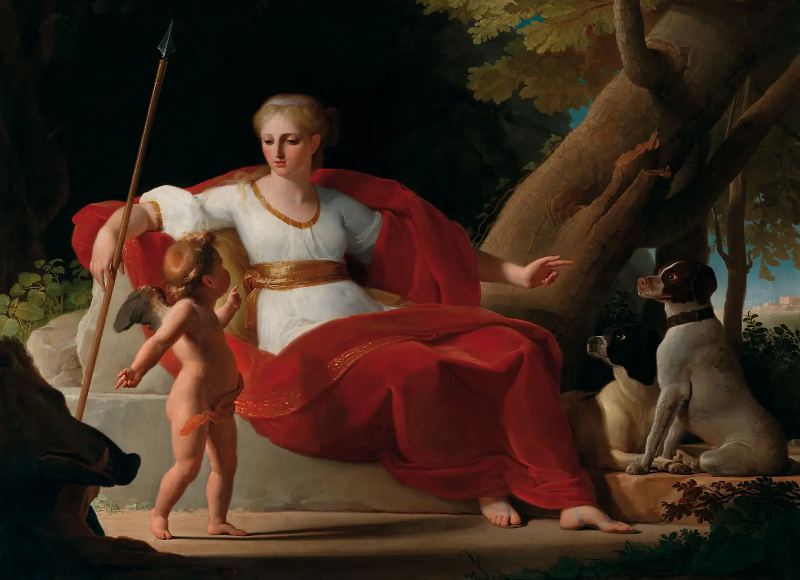
Atalanta

Pietro Pedroni or Petroni (30 November 1744 – 1803) was an Italian painter of the Neoclassic period.

== Biography ==
Pietro Pedroni was born in Pontremoli and was artistically trained in Parma and Rome. He was taught under Angelo Banchero. In 1785 he was named court painter in Florence, and became rector of the Royal Academy of Fine Arts in that city. He was assisted by Giuseppe Piattoli.

Subsequent generations had a poor impression of the man: Saltini in his History of Fine Arts of Tuscany said of him:

He was mediocre painter; and he obtained his position by some cabal, and after being placed in the direction of teaching of Florentine painting in the Academy, he did great damage to art. Little had he drawn, and less painted less before his appointment; he did nothing afterward, and completely abandoned the brushes. He always spoke to young pupils, but never once said, here's how it works. Woe to art teachers who argue and write, used to say Canova, it is a sign that they dare not and can not do (art).

Others are less biting, for example, Francesco Inghirami said that:

He settled in Florence but worked little and reluctantly due to his poor health he had. If the right audience does not find in him an exceptional painter, he was an amazing teacher, erudite in theories, highly eloquent, and most loving in teaching his students.

Among his pupils at the Academy were Pietro Benvenuti, who would replace him as director of the Academy, and Pietro Ermini. He died in Florence sometime in 1803.
