= Pietro Ermini =

Italian painter and engraver

Pietro Ermini (1774–1850) was an Italian painter and engraver, active in Florence.

== Biography ==
Ermini was born in Arezzo. There, the mathematician-architect Angiolo De' Giudici mentored him, obtained for him a stipend, and convinced his parents to send him to Florence to study at the Academy of Fine Arts under Pietro Petroni. One of his classmates was Pietro Benvenuti. In 1833, he nearly became blind, and though he had his sight improved by surgery, he had to abandon his career. He is known for many highly detailed engravings of classic works in the Florentine Galleries.

One of his pupils at the Academy was Giuseppe Angelelli.
