= Luca Grimaldi (Doge of Genoa) =

Doge of the Republic of Genoa and king of Corsica

149th Doge of the Republic of Genoa
- In office January 22, 1728 – January 22, 1730
- Preceded by: Gerolamo Veneroso
- Succeeded by: Francesco Maria Balbi

Personal details
- Born: 1675 Genoa, Republic of Genoa
- Died: 1750 (aged 74–75) Genoa, Republic of Genoa

Luca Grimaldi (Genoa, 1675 - Genoa, 1750) was the 149th Doge of the Republic of Genoa and king of Corsica.

== Biography ==
During his mandate as Doge. Grimaldi promoted two public works for the Genoese city and the readjustment of the donkey-back water conduit for the supply of the republican capital. He ended the dogate on January 22, 1730, but would continue to serve the republic in other state jobs. Grimaldi died in Genoa in 1750.

== See also ==
- Republic of Genoa
- Doge of Genoa
- House of Grimaldi

== Sources ==
- Buonadonna, Sergio. Rosso doge. I dogi della Repubblica di Genova dal 1339 al 1797.
