= Antonio Albergati =

Italian Roman Catholic prelate

Most Reverend Antonio Albergati
- Bishop of Bisceglie
- Church: Catholic Church
- Diocese: Diocese of Bisceglie
- In office: 1609–1627
- Predecessor: Alessandro Cospi
- Successor: Nicola Bellolatto
- Previous posts: Apostolic Nuncio to Germany (1610–1621); Apostolic Collector to Portugal (1621–1624)

Orders
- Ordination: 2 August 1609
- Consecration: 23 August 1609 by Giovanni Garzia Mellini

Personal details
- Born: 16 September 1566 Bologna, Italy
- Died: 13 January 1634 (age 60) Bisceglie, Italy

Antonio Albergati (16 September 1566 – 13 January 1634) was a Roman Catholic prelate who served as Bishop of Bisceglie (1609–1627), Apostolic Nuncio to Germany (1610–1621), and Apostolic Collector to Portugal (1621–1624).

== Biography ==
Antonio Albergati, son of the philosopher Fabio, was born in Bologna, Italy on 16 September 1566 and ordained a priest on 2 August 1609. On 3 August 1609, he was appointed during the papacy of Pope Paul V as Bishop of Bisceglie. On 23 August 1609, he was consecrated bishop by Giovanni Garzia Mellini, Bishop of Imola, with Domenico Rivarola, Titular Archbishop of Nazareth, and Antonio d'Aquino, Bishop of Sarno, serving as co-consecrators. On 26 April 1610, he was appointed during the papacy of Pope Paul V as Apostolic Nuncio to Germany On 15 September 1621, he was appointed during the papacy of Pope Paul V as Apostolic Collector to Portugal where he served until his resignation in 1624. He served as Bishop of Bisceglie until his resignation in 1627. He died on 13 Jan 1634.

== Episcopal succession ==
While bishop, he was the principal consecrator of:

- Stephen Strecheus, Titular Bishop of Dionysias and Auxiliary Bishop of Liège (1615);
- Gereon Otto von Gutmann zu Sobernheim, Titular Bishop of Cyrene and Auxiliary Bishop of Cologne (1616);

and the principal co-consecrator of:

- Vincenzo Napoli, Bishop of Patti (1609).

== External links and additional sources ==
- Cheney, David M. "Nunciature to Portugal". Catholic-Hierarchy.org. (for Chronology of Bishops) ^{[self-published]}
- Chow, Gabriel. "Apostolic Nunciature Portugal". GCatholic.org. (for Chronology of Bishops) ^{[self-published]}
- Cheney, David M. "Diocese of Bisceglie". Catholic-Hierarchy.org. (for Chronology of Bishops) ^{[self-published]}
- Chow, Gabriel. "Diocese of Bisceglie (Italy)". GCatholic.org. (for Chronology of Bishops) ^{[self-published]}
- Cheney, David M. "Nunciature to Germany". Catholic-Hierarchy.org. (for Chronology of Bishops) ^{[self-published]}
- Chow, Gabriel. "Apostolic Nunciature Germany". GCatholic.org. (for Chronology of Bishops) ^{[self-published]}

Catholic Church titles
Preceded by Attilio Amalteo	Apostolic Nuncio to Germany; 1610–1621	Succeeded by Pietro Francesco Montorio
Preceded by Vincenzo Landinelli	Apostolic Collector to Portugal; 1621–1624	Succeeded by Giovanni Battista Maria Pallotta
Preceded by Alessandro Cospi	Bishop of Bisceglie; 1609–1627	Succeeded by Nicola Bellolatto
