= Giuseppe Lomellini =

Doge of the Republic of Genoa

175th Doge of the Republic of Genoa
- In office February 4, 1777 – February 4, 1779
- Preceded by: Brizio Giustiniani
- Succeeded by: Giacomo Maria Brignole

Personal details
- Born: 1723 Genoa, Republic of Genoa
- Died: 1803 (aged 79–80) Genoa, Ligurian Republic

Giuseppe Lomellini (Genoa, 1723 – Genoa, 1803) was the 175th Doge of the Republic of Genoa.

== Biography ==
Lomellini ascended to dogal power on February 4, 1777, the one hundred and thirty in biennial succession and the one hundred and seventy-fifth in republican history. For the coronation ceremony at the Genoa Cathedral, the Genoese senate ordered a new purple and a new royal cloak for the wear of the previous clothing and greeted the election of the new doge with fifty-one cannon shots instead of the thirty thunder routines. During his dogate the ruinous fire of the Ducal palace occurred on the morning of November 3, 1777, followed by a prompt reconstruction and embellishment of the Palace. The following year the construction of the so-called "New Road" was decided. The two-year term ended on February 4, 1779. Giuseppe Lomellini died in Genoa in 1803.

== See also ==
- Republic of Genoa
- Doge of Genoa
