= Diocese of Bisceglie =

Diocese in Apulia in southern Italy

Diocese of Bisceglie (historical) Dioecesis Vigiliensis
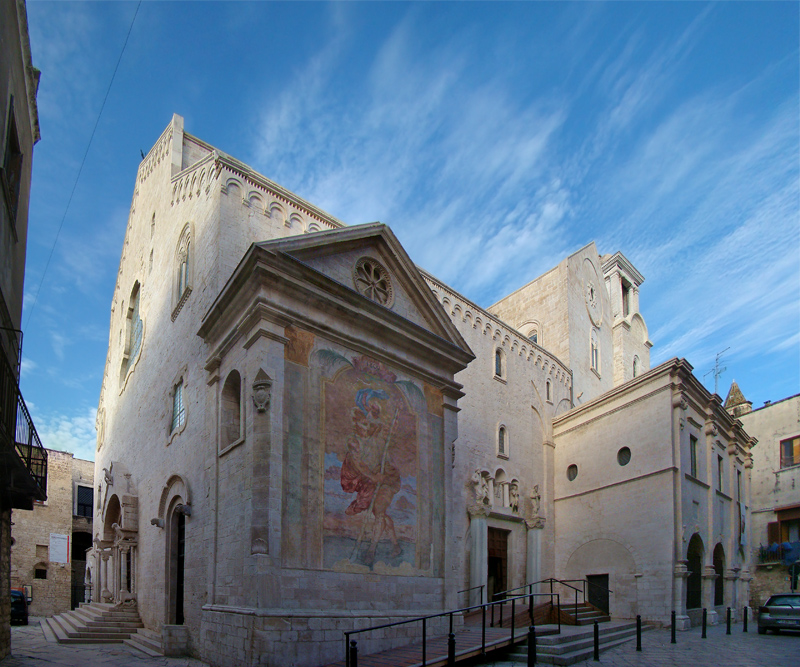

Location
- Country: Italy
- Territory: Apulia (Puglia)
- Ecclesiastical province: Trani
- Metropolitan: Archbishop of Trani
- Coordinates: 41°14′35″N 16°30′19″E

Statistics
- Population: Total; Catholics: (as of 1762); 12,000 (est.); 12,000 (100.0%)

Information
- Denomination: Roman Catholic
- Sui iuris church: Latin Church
- Rite: Roman Rite
- Established: 8th Century to 1818
- Cathedral: Cathedrale di S. Pietro Apostolo
- Patron saint: The Apostle Peter

Current leadership
- Pope: Leo XIV
- Metropolitan Archbishop: Giovan Battista Pichieri

Website
- Archdiocese of Trani e Bisceglie

The Diocese of Bisceglie (Latin: Dioecesis Vigiliensis) was a Roman Catholic diocese located in the town of Bisceglie on the Adriatic Sea in the province of Barletta-Andria-Trani, Apulia in southern Italy. It is five miles south of Trani.

In 1818, it was united with the Archdiocese of Trani to form the Archdiocese of Trani-Bisceglie.

== History of the diocese ==
In 839, and again in 840, the territory of Bisciglie was attacked and devastated by the Saracens (Arabs and Moors from north Africa).

On 1 October 1071 Bishop Giovanni was present at the consecration of the church of the Monastery of Montecassino by Pope Alexander II.

In 1079, Robert Guiscard, who had taken the title of Duke of Apulia, met his vassals at Melfi. Count Pietro of Trani, who considered himself Guiscard's equal, did not attend. Guiscard therefore campaigned against Trani, Bisceglie, Giovennazo, Corato and Andria, and took prisoners.

The Cathedral of S. Peter was dedicated on 1 May 1295 by Bishop Leo with the assistance of seven other bishops. The Cathedral had a Chapter composed of seven dignities, sixteen Canons, and ten chaplains. In 1685 the Cathedral Chapter contained seven dignities and sixteen Canons. The dignities were: the Archdeacon, the Archpriest, two Primicerii, the Prior, the Dean, and the Penitentiary. In 1762 there were six dignities and twenty six Canons. The city of Bisceglie had c. 12,000 inhabitants, with three parish churches (and a total of ten churches inside the city); there were five houses of male religious and two monasteries of monks.

The diocese of Biceglie had two Collegiate Churches, S. Adoeno (with an Abbot curate, nine Canons, and six chaplains) and Ss. Matteo e Niccolò (with two Abbots, eight Canons, and five chaplains). On 15 July 1818, Pope Pius VII, answering a petition from the Chapter of S. Adoeno, granted the Chapter the power to add to the number of choral chaplains.

There were eleven churches outside the city in the territory of the diocese of Bisceglie.

== Bishops of the diocese of Bisceglie ==
Erected: 8th Century
Latin Name: Vigiliensis
Metropolitan: Archdiocese of Trani

=== to 1200 ===
...

- Georgius (Sergius) (attested 787)
- Mercurius (attested 1059)
- Ioannes (attested 1071, 1072)
- Stephanus (1099)
- Amandus (attested 30 July 1154 – 1182)
- Bisantius, O.S.B. (attested 1182 – 19 October 1219)

=== from 1200 to 1400 ===
...

- Nicolaus (attested 1229)
- (Al)bertus (attested 1237)
- Nicolaus (attested 1240)
- Sergius (1267 – 1274)

Sede vacante (1275/1276 – 1285)
? Opizzo Fieschi Apostolic Administrator (1280.04.01 – 1288.06.04)

- Hieronymus (1285)
- Leo(nius)
- Leone di Gaeta (attested 1303, 1306, 1309)
- Giovanni (attested 1314)
- Giacomo (1317? – ?)
- Nicola (1320? – ?)
- Bartolomeo Fiore, O.P. (1327? – ?)
- Martino Sambiasi (? – death 1348)
- Simone de Rayano (5 Nov 1348 – death 1367?)
- Nicola Ricci, O.F.M. (19 July 1387 – 21 April 1421) (Avignon Obedience)
- Domenico (? – ?) (Roman Obedience)
- Giovanni (1390? – 1390)
- Giacomo Federici, Carmelites (O. Carm.) (4 Jan 1391 – 1399?)

=== from 1400 to 1600 ===
- Francesco Falconi (1399? – ?)
- Nicola Falconi (1413 – death 1442)
- Giacomo Pietro de Gravina (23 May 1442 – death 1476)
- Bernardino Barbiani (9 Aug 1476 – 24 Aug 1487)
- Martino de Madio da Tramonti (Martino de Maggio) (24 Aug 1487 – 18 Nov 1507)
- Antonio Lupicino (19 November 1507 – 1524)
- Geronimo Sifola (11 May 1524 – death 1565)
- Giovanni Andrea Signati (22 Aug 1565 – 23 Sept 1575)
- Leonardo Bonaccorsi (23 Sept 1575 – death 1576)
- Giovanni Battista Soriani, O. Carm. (22 Aug 1576 – death 25 June 1582)
- Nicola Secadenari (1583 – death 30 July 1583)
- Alessandro Cospi (7 Oct 1583 – death 15 May 1609)

=== from 1600 to 1817 ===
- Antonio Albergati (1609.08.03 – 1627)
- Nicola Bellolatto (1627.03.08 – death 1636.07.15)
- Bernardino Scala (12 January 1637 – 28 May 1643)
- Guglielmo Gaddi (1643.08.31 – death 1652.02.07)
- Giuseppe Lomellini, O.S.B.(1652.08.26 – death 1657.08.25)
- Cesare Cancellotti (1 April 1658 – 16 June 1662)
- Giovanni Battista Penna, O.E.S.A. (9 April 1663 – death 2 July 1664)
- Francesco Antonio Ricci, O.F.M. Obs. (15 September 1664 – death 28 April 1685)
- Giuseppe Crispini (10 Sept 1685 – 13 November 1690)
- Pompeo Sarnelli (17 February 1692 – death 7 July 1724)
- Antonio Pacecco (Antonio Pacicco), O.F.M. (11 September 1724 – death March 1739)
- Francesco Antonio Leonardi (15 July 1739 – death 1762)
- Donato Antonio Giannelli (22 November 1762 – death 1783)

Sede vacante (1783 – 1792)

- Salvatore Palica, O.S.B. Cel. (26 March 1792 – 1800)

Sede vacante (1800 – 1818)

The Diocese of Bisceglie was united on 27 June 1818 with the Archdiocese of Trani to form the Archdiocese of Trani e Bisceglie

== Books ==
=== Reference Works ===
- Eubel, Conradus, ed. (1913). Hierarchia catholica, Tomus 1 (second ed.). Münster: Libreria Regensbergiana. (in Latin)
- Eubel, Conradus, ed. (1914). Hierarchia catholica, Tomus 2 (second ed.). Münster: Libreria Regensbergiana. (in Latin)
- Eubel, Conradus, ed. (1923). Hierarchia catholica, Tomus 3 (second ed.). Münster: Libreria Regensbergiana.
- Gams, Pius Bonifatius (1873). Series episcoporum Ecclesiae catholicae: quotquot innotuerunt a beato Petro apostolo. Ratisbon: Typis et Sumptibus Georgii Josephi Manz. pp. 857–858. (Use with caution; obsolete)
- Gauchat, Patritius (Patrice) (1935). Hierarchia catholica IV (1592-1667). Münster: Libraria Regensbergiana. (in Latin)
- Ritzler, Remigius; Sefrin, Pirminus (1952). Hierarchia catholica medii et recentis aevi V (1667-1730). Patavii: Messagero di S. Antonio. (in Latin)
- Ritzler, Remigius; Sefrin, Pirminus (1958). Hierarchia catholica medii et recentis aevi VI (1730-1799). Patavii: Messagero di S. Antonio. (in Latin)
- Ritzler, Remigius; Sefrin, Pirminus (1968). Hierarchia Catholica medii et recentioris aevi sive summorum pontificum, S. R. E. cardinalium, ecclesiarum antistitum series... A pontificatu Pii PP. VII (1800) usque ad pontificatum Gregorii PP. XVI (1846) (in Latin). Vol. VII. Monasterii: Libr. Regensburgiana.
- Ritzler, Remigius; Pirminus Sefrin (1978). Hierarchia catholica Medii et recentioris aevi... A Pontificatu PII PP. IX (1846) usque ad Pontificatum Leonis PP. XIII (1903) (in Latin). Vol. VIII. Il Messaggero di S. Antonio.
- Pięta, Zenon (2002). Hierarchia catholica medii et recentioris aevi... A pontificatu Pii PP. X (1903) usque ad pontificatum Benedictii PP. XV (1922) (in Latin). Vol. IX. Padua: Messagero di San Antonio. ISBN 978-88-250-1000-8.

=== Studies ===
- Avino, Vincenzio d' (1848). Cenni storici sulle chiese arcivescovili, vescovili, e prelatizie (nullius) del regno delle due Sicilie (in Italian). Naples: dalle stampe di Ranucci. pp. 61–65.
- Cappelletti, Giuseppe (1870). Le chiese d'Italia dalla loro origine sino ai nostri giorni (in Italian). Vol. vigesimoprimo (21). Venezia: Antonelli.
- Kehr, Paulus Fridolin (1962). Italia pontificia. Regesta pontificum Romanorum. Vol. IX: Samnium–Apulia–Lucanium. Berlin: Weidmann.
- Loud, G. A. (2007). The Latin Church in Norman Italy. Cambridge University Press. ISBN 978-1-107-32000-0.
- Loud, Graham (2014). The Age of Robert Guiscard: Southern Italy and the Northern Conquest. New York: Routledge. ISBN 978-1-317-90023-8.
- Sarnelli, Pompeo (1693). Memorie de' vescovi di Biseglia, e della stessa citta (in Italian). Naples: Giuseppe Roselli.
- Ughelli, Ferdinando; Coleti, Niccolò (1721). Italia sacra, sive De episcopis Italiae et insularum adjacentium (in Latin). Vol. Tomus septimus (7). Venice: apud Sebastianum Coleti. pp. 935–952.
