= Cosimo Gheri =

Italian Catholic bishop

Cosimo Gheri (born August 1, 1513 in Pistoia – died September 24, 1537 in Fano) was an Italian Catholic bishop and a member of the noble Gheri family of Pistoia. He was appointed Bishop of Fano at the young age of 16 by Pope Clement VII through a papal bull on June 24, 1530. However, despite holding the title, he was never consecrated as a priest or bishop.

Gheri was the nephew of Ghero Gheri, who served as the Bishop of Fano from 1518 to 1528. He succeeded Cardinal Ercole Gonzaga, who had been the apostolic administrator of the diocese between 1528 and 1530. After his appointment, Cosimo Gheri, fearful of the infectious diseases prevalent along the Adriatic coast, primarily resided in Padua, where he attended the university and made only occasional visits to Fano.

According to the writer Benedetto Varchi, Gheri fell victim to the so-called "Outrage of Fano." Pier Luigi Farnese, recently appointed by his father Pope Paul III as Gonfaloniere of the Church, was traveling through the Papal States to inspect the fortresses in the Marche region. When he arrived in Fano, he met Gheri, who received him with full honors.

The next day, Farnese met the bishop again and expressed his intentions:

"He began, by touching and groping the bishop, to want to perform the most indecent acts that can be done with women."

— Benedetto Varchi in: Storia fiorentina, 1547

However, since the bishop did not yield and defended himself vigorously, Pier Luigi allegedly had him tied up and, under the threat of daggers, raped him. Unable to endure the humiliation of the attack, the bishop died a few weeks later. Some speculate that Pier Luigi himself had the bishop poisoned to prevent the news of the rape from spreading.

== Bibliography ==
- P. M. Amiani, Memorie Istoriche della città di Fano, Fano, 1751, 2 vol.
- V. Bartoccetti, Studia Picena, Vol. II, pp. 153–208.
- Don G. Ceccarelli, I Vescovi delle Diocesi di Fano, Fossombrone, Cagli e Pergola - Cronotassi Fondazione Cassa di Risparmio di Fano, 2005, p. 42.
- G. della Casa, Giovanni della Casa, Opere, Venezia, 1728, tomo IV, pp. 225–240.
- R. Massignan, Pier Luigi Farnese e il vescovo di Fano, "Atti e memoria della R. deputazione di storia patria per le provincie delle Marche", n.s. II 1905, pp. 249–304.
- A. Salza, Pasquiniana, "Giornale storico della letteratura italiana", XLIII 1904, pp. 223–225 (le ultime lettere scritte dal Gheri).
- B. Varchi, Storia fiorentina, Le Monnier, Firenze 1858, vol. 2, pp. 268–270.
- Antonella Giusti (2000). "Gheri, Cosimo". Dizionario Biografico degli Italiani (in Italian). Vol. 53: Gelati–Ghisalberti. Rome: Istituto dell'Enciclopedia Italiana. ISBN 978-88-12-00032-6.
