= Portrait of Pier Luigi Farnese =

1546 painting by Titian

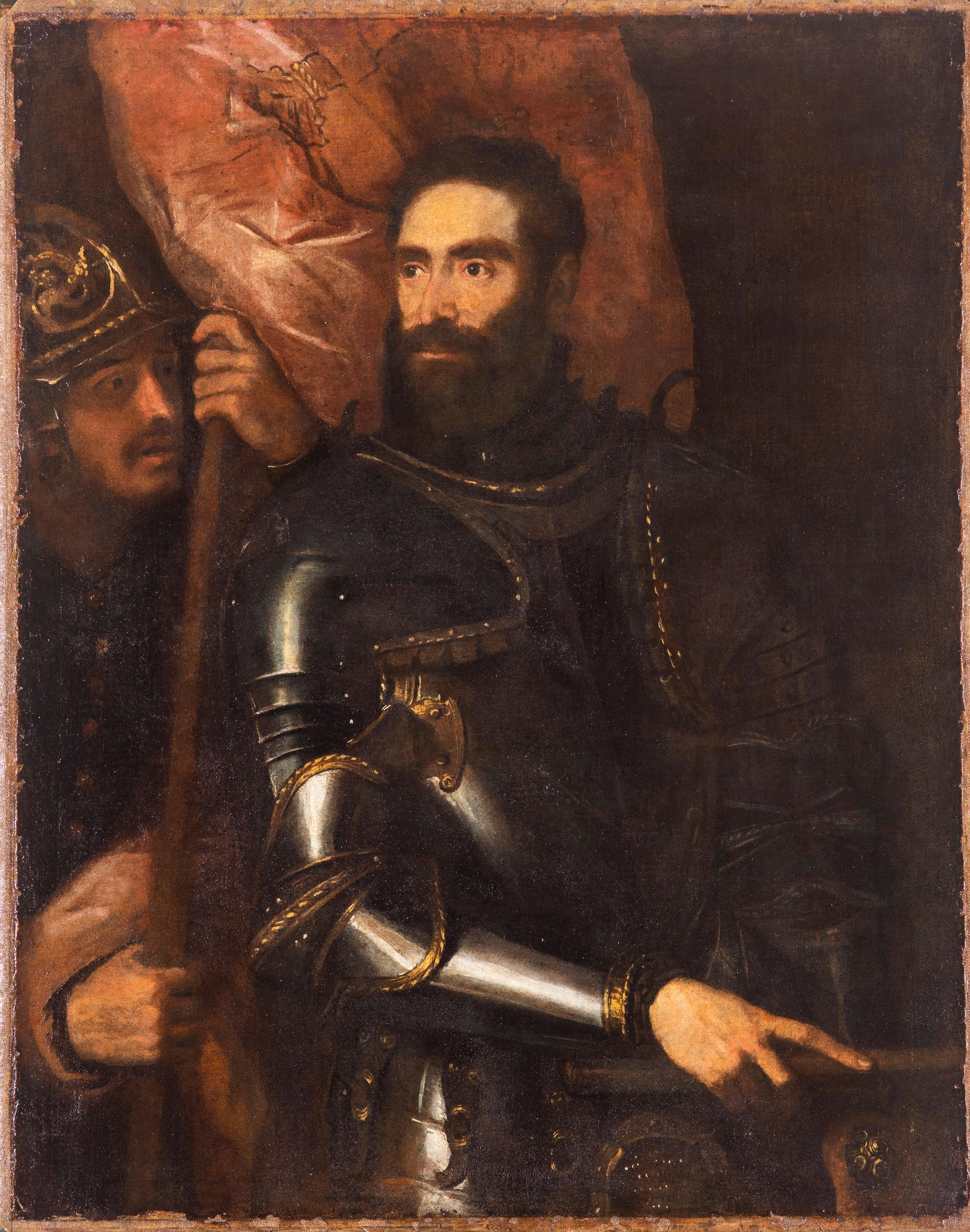
Portrait of Pier Luigi Farnese (1546) by Titian

Portrait of Pier Luigi Farnese is a heavily damaged oil on canvas painting of Pier Luigi Farnese, Duke of Parma by Titian, from 1546. It is now in Room 2 of the Museum of Capodimonte, in Naples.

It was produced on the artist's return to Venice from Rome in 1546. Its subject was a son of Pope Paul III, dressed in the armour and accoutrements of a papal gonfaloniere. He was stabbed to death in 1547 in a plot instigated by the Landi and Anguissola families on the advice of the duke of Milan Ferrante I Gonzaga.

== See also ==
- List of works by Titian
