= Alessandro Sforza (cardinal) =

Italian bishop and cardinal (1534–1581)

- Archpriest of the Basilica di Santa Maria Maggiore
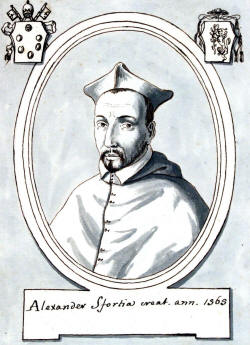
- Church: Catholic Church
- See: Basilica di Santa Maria Maggiore
- In office: 1572 – 16 May 1581
- Predecessor: Charles Borromeo
- Successor: Filippo Boncompagni
- Other post: Cardinal-Priest of Santa Maria in Via (1565-1581)
- Previous post: Bishop of Parma (1560-1573)

Orders
- Created cardinal: 12 March 1565 by Pope Pius IV

Personal details
- Born: 1534 Rome, Papal States
- Died: 16 May 1581 (aged 46–47) Macerata, March of Ancona, Papal States

Alessandro Sforza (1534 – 16 May 1581) was an Italian Roman Catholic bishop and cardinal.

== Biography ==
A member of the House of Sforza, Alessandro Sforza was born in Rome in 1534, the son of Bosio II Sforza, count of Santa Fiora e Cotignola, and his wife Costanza Farnese, who was the natural and legitimized daughter of Pope Paul III. His brother Guido Ascanio Sforza di Santa Fiora also became a cardinal. He was the uncle of Cardinal Francesco Sforza.

In June 1542, he became a scriptor of apostolic letters. He completed his training at the Gymnasium of Perugia, studying letters and probably also civil and canon law, and gained the academic title of Magister. Early in his ecclesiastical career, he became a papal chaplain.Through his older brother's influence, Allessandro was able to purchase a post in the Apostolic Camera. He became a canon of St. Peter's Basilica on 18 April 1554.

Around 1549, Sforza came into possession of the garden/vineyard of Cardinal Rodolfo Pio da Carpi on the Quirinal. However, sometime after his death, financial constraints compelled his family to sell it to the Barberini. It became the site of the Palazzo Barberini.

He was caught up in a minor scandal after was he involved in a plan to return two galleys in use by the French to Charles V, Holy Roman Emperor. Pretending to wish to embark, he had the vessels travel from Civitavecchia to Gaeta. The Sforza's were supporters of the Emperor; Pope Paul IV was not. Their actions caused an international outcry. The pope considered this an outrage and had Cardinal Guido Ascanio Sforza arrested in Castel Sant'Angelo. Alexander was dismissed from his posts and lost his ecclesiastical benefits. Imperial diplomacy facilitated an agreement: the return to Civitavecchia of Alessandro, with the galleys, in exchange for the release of his cardinal brother. The solution was accepted, however Sforza landed before reaching his destination and took refuge in the family fiefdom of Santa Fiora. After some cardinals intervened, Alessandro was reinstated in October 1557.

In 1559, Sforza was named a praefectus annonae, charged with supervising the city's grain supply. In April 1560, he was bishop-elect of Parma, although his brother reserved several rights. He became an active participant in the Council of Trent. In 1564, he presided over the diocesan synod in Parma, and oversaw the publication of the Table of Christian Doctrine (in Parma, for Seth Viotti, 1564), a handbook which constitutes an early example of a post-Tridentine catechism. In 1566, he funded the diocesan seminary.

Pope Pius IV made him a cardinal priest in the consistory of 12 March 1565. He received the red hat and the titular church of Santa Maria in Via Lata on 15 May 1565. He participated in the papal conclave of 1565-66 that elected Pope Pius V. Together with Cardinals Giovanni Ricci, Giovanni Francesco Commendone, and Marcantonio Bobba, he was named by Pope Pius V inspector of rivers, ports and public roads of Rome. On 5 January 1570, the pope named him papal legate a latere to Bologna and Romagna.

Alessandro Sforza participated in the papal conclave of 1572 that elected Pope Gregory XIII. The new pope named him archpriest of the Basilica di Santa Maria Maggiore; during the jubilee year of 1575, he opened the holy door there. Gregory XIII also made him cardinal protector of Spain. Sometime before 30 March 1573 he resigned the government of the Diocese of Parma. He was named Prefect of the Apostolic Signatura on 12 January 1575. On 11 July 1580, he was named papal legate to the Papal States, charged with eliminating banditry.

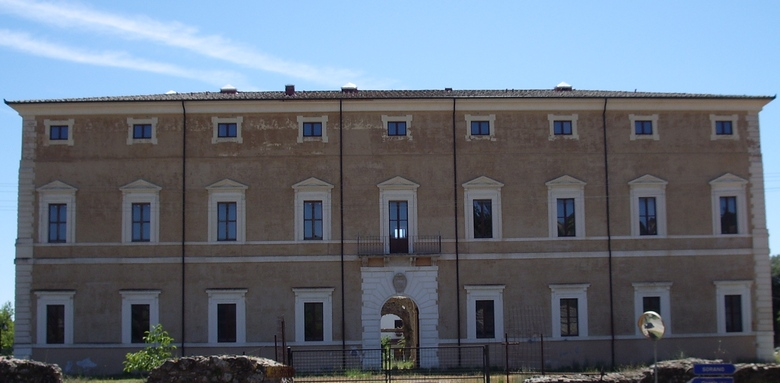
Villa Sforzesca, Castell'Azzara

In 1573, he commissioned Giacomo della Porta to complete the family chapel started by his brother at Santa Maria Maggiore. Around 1576, Sforza had a villa built, called "Sforzesca", in Castell'Azzara. It served the cardinal both as a summer residence and as a basis for the repression of the Brigandage. Gregory XIII stayed there in September 1578.

He died suddenly in Macerata on 16 May 1581, aged 46 or 47. He was buried in the Sforza family chapel in the Basilica di Santa Maria Maggiore.
