= Costanza Farnese =

Italian noblewoman (1500–1545)

- Born: 19 December 1500; Rome
- Died: 23 May 1545 (aged 44); Rome
- Spouse: Bosio II Sforza
- Issue: Guido Ascanio Sforza di Santa Fiora; Alessandro Sforza; Sforza Sforza Mario Sforza; Faustina Sforza; Francesca Sforza; Camilla
- Father: Pope Paul III
- Mother: Silvia Ruffini

Costanza Farnese (19 December 1500 – 23 May 1545) was a daughter of Alessandro Farnese and Silvia Ruffini. Born before her father became Pope Paul III, her siblings were Pier Luigi, Paul, Ranuccio and Lucrezia.

She married Bosio II Sforza, count of Santa Fiora e Cotignola, they had:

- Guido Ascanio
- Alessandro Sforza
- Sforza Sforza, whose children were:
  - Francesco Sforza
  - Alessandro, 7th count of Santa Fiora, duke of Seni and prince of Valmontone, father of cardinal Federico Sforza.
  - Costanza Sforza
- Mario (1530–1591), count of S. Fiora, married Fulvia Conti
- Faustina Sforza, married Muzio Sforza of Caravaggio
- Francesca Sforza, married Girolamo Orsini
- Camilla, married Besso Ferrero of Masserano

== Sources ==
- McIver, Katherine A. (2016). "An Invisible Enterprise: Women and Domestic Architecture in Early Modern Italy". In McIver, Katherine A. (ed.). Wives, Widows, Mistresses, and Nuns in Early Modern Italy: Making the. Routledge. pp. 159–180.
- Williams, George L. (1998). Papal Genealogy: The Families and Descendants of the Popes. McFarland & Company, Inc.
