= Guido Ascanio Sforza di Santa Fiora =

Italian cardinal

His Eminence Guido Ascanio Sforza di Santa Fiora
- Camerlengo of the Holy Roman Church
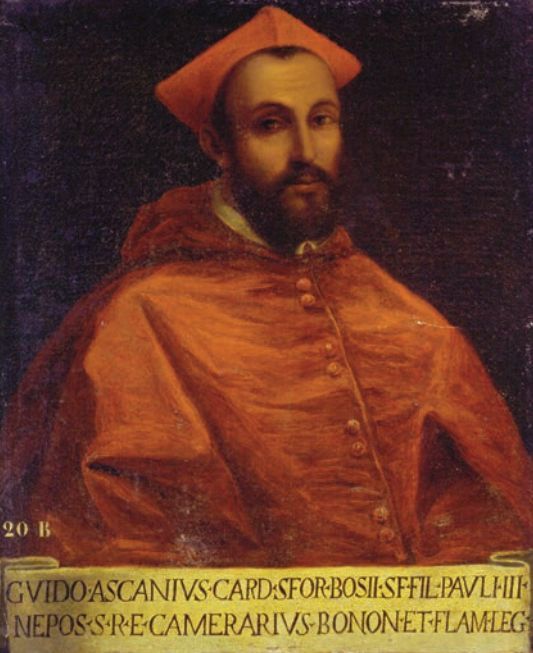
- Installed: 22 October 1537 – 6 October 1564
- Predecessor: Agostino Spinola
- Successor: Vitellozzo Vitelli
- Other post: Previously Bishop of Montefiascone

Orders
- Created cardinal: 18 December 1534

Personal details
- Born: 26 November 1518 Rome, Papal States
- Died: 6 October 1564 (aged 45) Mantua, Duchy of Mantua

Guido Ascanio Sforza di Santa Fiora (26 November 1518 – 6 October 1564) was an Italian cardinal, known also as The cardinal of Santa Fiora.

== Life ==
Born in Rome, he was the eldest son of Costanza Farnese and therefore grandson of Pope Paul III. His father was Bosio II, Count of Santa Fiora. His younger brother was Cardinal Alessandro Sforza (1565). He was the uncle of Cardinal Francesco Sforza and great-uncle of Cardinal Federico Sforza (1645). During his time as a cardinal he served as legate as well as administrator of different towns and episcopal sees.

His ecclesiastical career started very early with his selection as Bishop of Montefiascone e Corneto, nowadays Diocese of Viterbo, Acquapendente, Bagnoregio, Montefiascone, Tuscania e San Martino al Monte Cimino on 12 November 1528 when he was not quite ten years of age.

=== Cardinal ===
His maternal grandfather, Alessandro Farnese, was elected Pope on 13 October 1534. (Costanza Farnese had been born to Alessandro's mistress before he became a priest.) While still a student at the Collegio degli Ancarani, Sforza was created a cardinal deacon in the consistory of 18 December 1534 by Pope Paul III with the Deaconry of Santi Vito, Modesto e Crescenzia. The elevation to the cardinalate of his grandsons, Alessandro Farnese, aged fourteen, and Sforza, aged sixteen, displeased the reform party and drew a protest from the emperor, but this was forgiven when, shortly after, he introduced into the Sacred College Reginald Pole, Gasparo Contarini, Jacopo Sadoleto, and Giovanni Pietro Caraffa.

In 1535, through Constanza's influence, his cousin Alessandro, gave up the position of administrator of the Diocese of Parma in favor of Guido Ascanio, who was also appointed papal legate of Bologna and Romagna. In April 1560 Sforza, resigned the administration of the bishopric of Parma in favor of his brother Cardinal Alessandro. His economic position was secured by income from a number of benefices concentrated in northern Italy,

Later, on 22 October 1537, a month shy of his nineteenth birthday, he was appointed Camerlengo of the Holy Roman Church, a position he held until his death. He was opted for the Deaconry of Santa Maria in Cosmedin on 31 May 1540, for the Deaconry of Sant'Eustachio on 10 December 1540 and finally for the Deaconry of Santa Maria in Via Lata on 9 March 1552. He succeeded his cousin Alessandro Farnese as Archpriest of the patriarchal Liberian Basilica in 1543 and began the Cappella Sforza in 1556.

He participated in the two papal conclaves of 1555 (the one in April which elected Marcellus II and that in May which chose Paul IV) whose election he strongly opposed. In the summer of 1555, he was caught up in a sensational affair when two of his brothers commandeered two French galleys from the port of Civitavecchia and sailed them to imperial-allied Gaeta, thanks to the complicity of the other brother Alessandro, and Guido Ascanio. At a time of tensions between Pope Paul IV and the Spanish party in Rome, this prompted the pope to order the arrest and imprisonment in Castel Sant'Angelo of Guido Ascanio, believed to be the director of the acts of his brothers. He was only released on 22 September, after twenty-two days of imprisonment, upon payment of a bail of 200,000 scudi.

Guido Ascanio and his brother Sforza were highly regarded by Charles V and Philip II. The positioning of the cardinal and the count was part of a skilful strategy, aimed at always guaranteeing family interests, given that the Sforza of Santa Fiora had very substantial interests in terms of ecclesiastical benefices and fiefdoms in the Lombardy, Parma and Piacenza. This explains why Guido Ascanio and his brothers divided themselves, with considerable unscrupulousness, between the imperial and the French sides, maintaining in any case a marked family solidarity. During the war of Siena, Guido served as general of the cavalry of the imperial army, together with one of his brothers, while the other brother Mario placed himself at the service of France and their Sienese allies.

He led the Spanish faction in the conclave held in December 1559, which resulted in the election of Pius IV who re-convoked the Council of Trent.

Guido Ascanio Sforza died on 6 October 1564 of fever in Canneto sull'Oglio, Mantua. His body was transferred to Rome and buried in his family's chapel in Santa Maria Maggiore.

== Sources ==
- Cheney, David M. "Guido Ascanio Cardinal Sforza di Santa Fiora". Catholic-Hierarchy.org. ^{[self-published]}
