= Silvia Ruffini =

Italian noble woman and mistress of Pope Paul III (1475-1561)

Silvia Ruffini (1475 – 6 December 1561 in Rome) was an Italian noble woman and mistress of Cardinal Alessandro Farnese before he became pope (Pope Paul III from 1534); she was the mother of his four children.

== Biography ==
Ruffini was the daughter of Rufino Ruffini and Giulia (last name unknown), who lived in a palace in the Colonna neighbourhood of Rome. She had four brothers, Giacomo, Girolamo, Ascanio and Mario, and two sisters, Camilla and Ippolita.

Around 1496 Ruffini married a Roman merchant named Giovanni Battista Crispo, with whom she had three sons: Sallustio, Virgilio and Cardinal Tiberio Crispo. Her husband died in 1501; she may already have been romantically involved with Cardinal Farnese by then.

Ruffini was introduced to Alessandro Farnese by his sister Giulia (mistress to Pope Alexander VI), and the cardinal offered to be her escort through Rome. Their first daughter, Costanza Farnese, was probably born in 1500. Ruffini had three other children with the cardinal; some of them may have been born while Ruffini's husband was still alive. The children were Pier Luigi Farnese, Paolo Farnese and Ranuccio Farnese. Pope Julius II and Pope Leo X legitimised the sons, as they had been born after Ruffini became a widow.

When Alessandro became Bishop of Parma, the church's vicar-general, Bishop Bartolomeo Guidiccioni, required him to end his relationship with Ruffini. As pope, Paul III kept her identity a secret, fearing the negative publicity that had plagued his sister Giulia. Baldassarre Molosso, a poet and guardian of the couple's children, hints that Paul III kept her in the town of Bolsena, a village owned by her son and where Paul III had a villa. The location was also close to Silvia's sister Camilla.

Tiberio Crispo

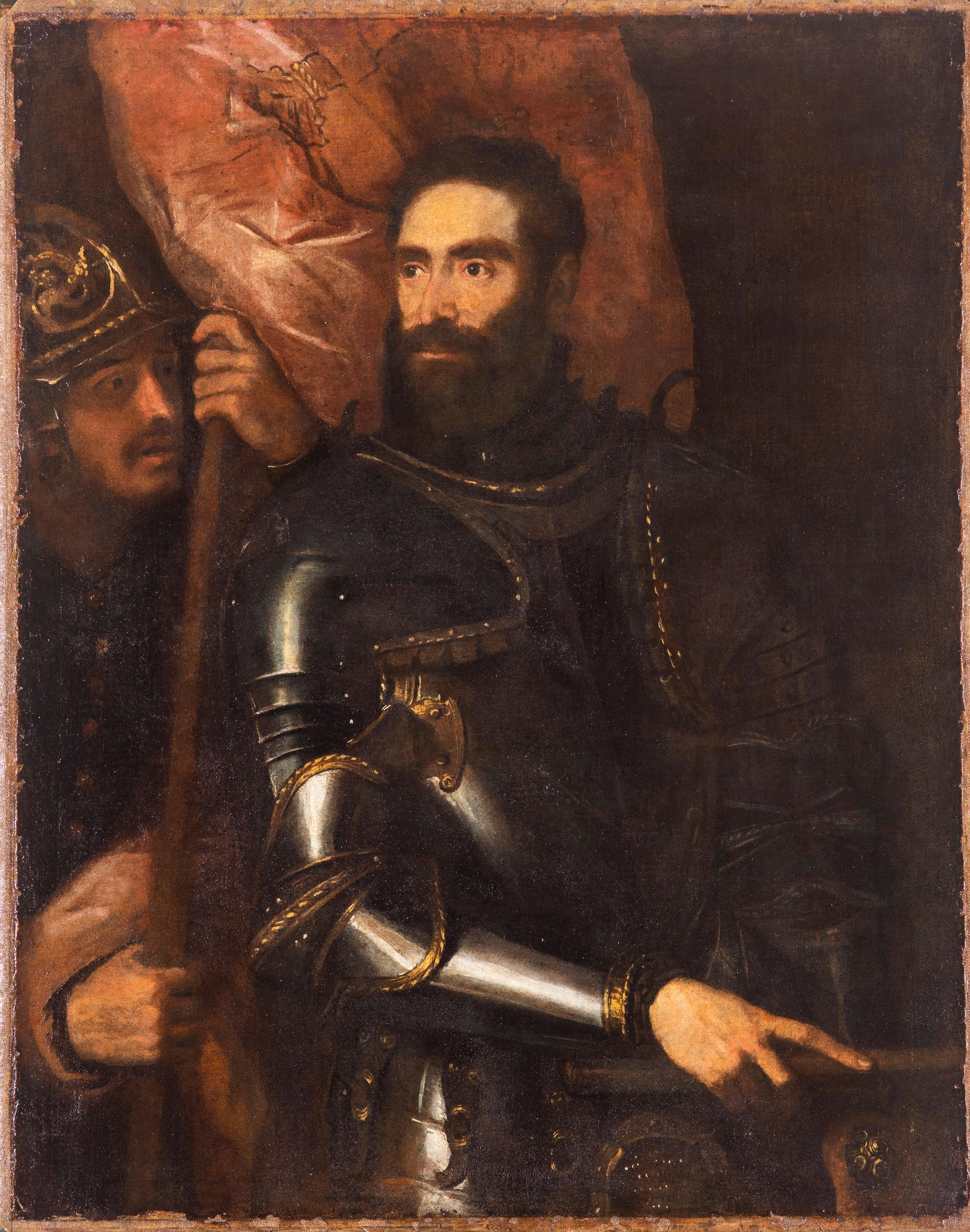
Pier Luigi Farnese by Titian.

Ruffini died on Tuesday 5 December 1561 in Rome, at the age of about 86, and was buried in a family crypt.

== Issue ==
She had three children by Giovanni Battista Crispo:

- Tiberio Crispo, who later became a cardinal;
- Sallustio Crispo;
- Virgilio Crispo.

She had four children by Alessandro Farnese (later Pope Paul III):

- Costanza Farnese (1500-1545), who married Bosio II Sforza of Santa Fiora, 9th Count of Santa Fiora;
- Pier Luigi Farnese (1503-1547), who married Gerolama Orsini and later became the Duke of Parma;
- Paolo Farnese (1504-1512);
- Ranuccio Farnese (1509-1529).

== Portrayals ==
Ruffini is portrayed by Laura Fedorowycz in the TV series Borgia.

Historian Patrizia Rosini believes Silvia was the model for two portraits: one in the Allegory of Baptism in the Rondanini Palace and the second in the Sala del Perseo in the castle of Sant'Angelo.
