= Rape of Fano =

1537 alleged scandal in Italy

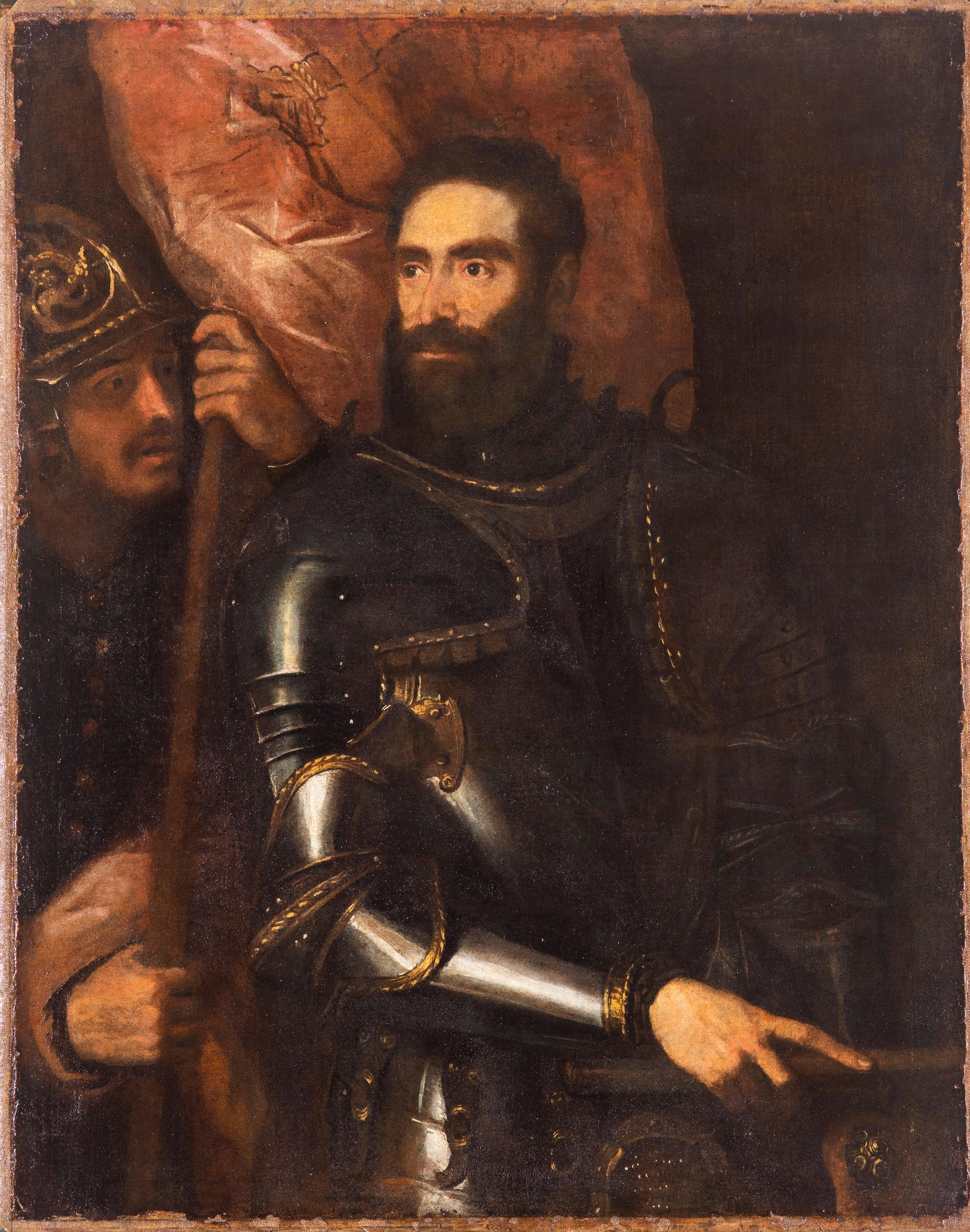
Pier Luigi Farnese in a portrait by Titian (1546). Museo di Capodimonte, Naples.

The rape of Fano (also outrage of Fano) is an alleged scandal that would have taken place on 26 or 27 May 1537 in the eponymous city (Papal States), involving the warlord Pier Luigi Farnese who raped the Bishop of the city, Cosimo Gheri, during an inspection of the Marche fortresses. Its historical veracity is matter of debate. The event is recorded by the Florentine historian Benedetto Varchi in the 16th book of his Storia fiorentina (first published in 1721). Nevertheless, a letter by Pietro Bembo, dated 5 January 1538, seems to confirm Varchi's account.

== History ==
=== Incident ===
The office of Gonfalonier of the Church being vacant, Pope Paul III of the House of Farnese let himself be convinced that his son Pier Luigi, an expert captain and faithful to him, could be the most suitable to hold it. In the consistory of 31 January 1537 the Pontiff perfected the appointment and the next day, in St. Peter's Basilica, he entrusted Pier Luigi with the sword and the banner of Captain of the Church. Farnese immediately began a journey through the territories of the Papal States, easily bending every resistance and reaching Piacenza (Emilia-Romagna) triumphantly. It was during this trip that the alleged scandal took place. The full account by Varchi:

In that same year a case took place, of which I do not remember having heard or read [...] a more execrable one [...] Messer Cosimo Gheri from Pistoia, Bishop of Fano, was aged twenty-four [...] when Lord Pier Luigi da Farnese (drunk of his own success and sure of his father's indulgence so that he was not to be chastised nor scolded, he went to the lands of the Church raping, either out of love or by force, how many young people he saw and liked) he left the city of Ancona to go to Fano, where a friar was Governor [...]. Having heard the coming of Pier Luigi and wishing to meet him, he asked the Bishop if he wanted to go to honor the Pontiff's son and Gonfalonier of the Holy Church; which he did, yet not very willingly. The first thing that Pier Luigi asked the Bishop was (but in his own and obscene words according to his custom, which was extremely disheartened) "how he enjoyed and had good time with those beautiful women of Fano". The Bishop, who was no less shrewd than good, acknowledging the question (and who made it) for what they were, replied modestly although somewhat indignant that "this was not his business" and, to draw himself out of that reasoning, he added: "Your excellency would do a great good to this city, which is all divided into factions, and through prudence and authority unify and pacify it". The next day, having planned what he intended to do, Pier Luigi sent (as if he wanted to reconcile the people of Fano) to call first the Governor, then the Bishop. The Governor left the room as soon as he saw the Bishop, and Pier Luigi began palpating and wrinkling the Bishop, wanting to do the most dishonest acts one could do with females. Because the Bishop, who was of little and very weak complexion [...] defended himself vigorously not only from him (who, being full of syphilis, almost couldn’t stand up), but from his other accomplices too, who were bidding to keep him still, he had him tied up [...]. Not only did they keep their naked daggers at his throat threatening him continually, if he moved, to slaughter him, but they also struck him with the tips and the knobs so that the signs remained there.

— Benedetto Varchi, Storia fiorentina, v. 3, book 16, p. 268-270

Cosimo Gheri died in that year, on 24 September, supposedly of pain due to the shock.

=== Reaction ===
The contemporaries have left many stories of Pier Luigi Farnese's unbridled sexuality and his homosexual tendencies, but the so-called rape of Fano had an international echo, being also instrumentalized, due to its connection with the Pope's family, in religious controversies between Catholics and Protestants. Pier Luigi Farnese's sexuality became target of frequent satires ("pasquinate") and the poet Niccolò Franco of Benevento (1515 – 1570) invented the verb "pierluigiare", meaning "to sodomize by force". When Farnese was killed in 1547, a satirical epigram among many so imagined his descent into hell:

Vis dicam? Ex italis stygias ut venit ad horas, / incoepit natibus Pluto timere suis.
Do you want me to tell you? When from the Italian shores he came to those of the underworld / Pluto began to fear for his buttocks.

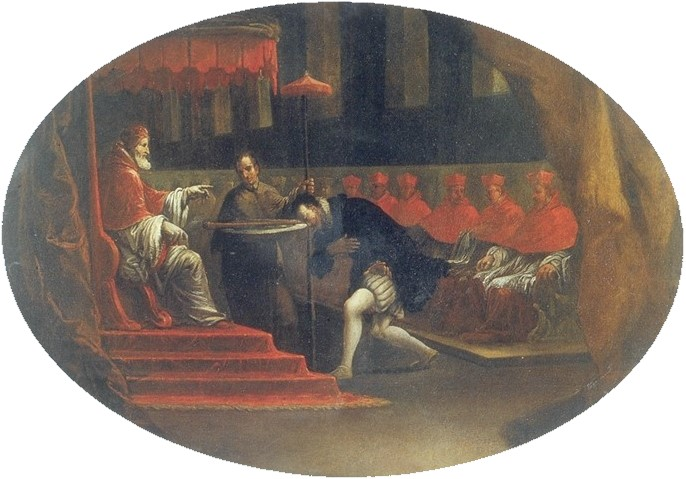
Pope Paul III appoints Pier Luigi Farnese as Duke of Parma and Piacenza. Ilario Spolverini, 1720s.
