= Ranuccio Farnese (1509–1529) =

Italian noble and son of Pope Paul III (1509–1529)

Ranuccio Farnese (1509–1529) was the natural son of Alessandro Farnese by Silvia Ruffini, born before his father was elected pope as Paul III. His siblings were Pier Luigi, Paolo and Costanza.
