= Pier Luigi Farnese =

Duke of Castro (1537–1545); Duke of Parma and Piacenza (1545–1547)

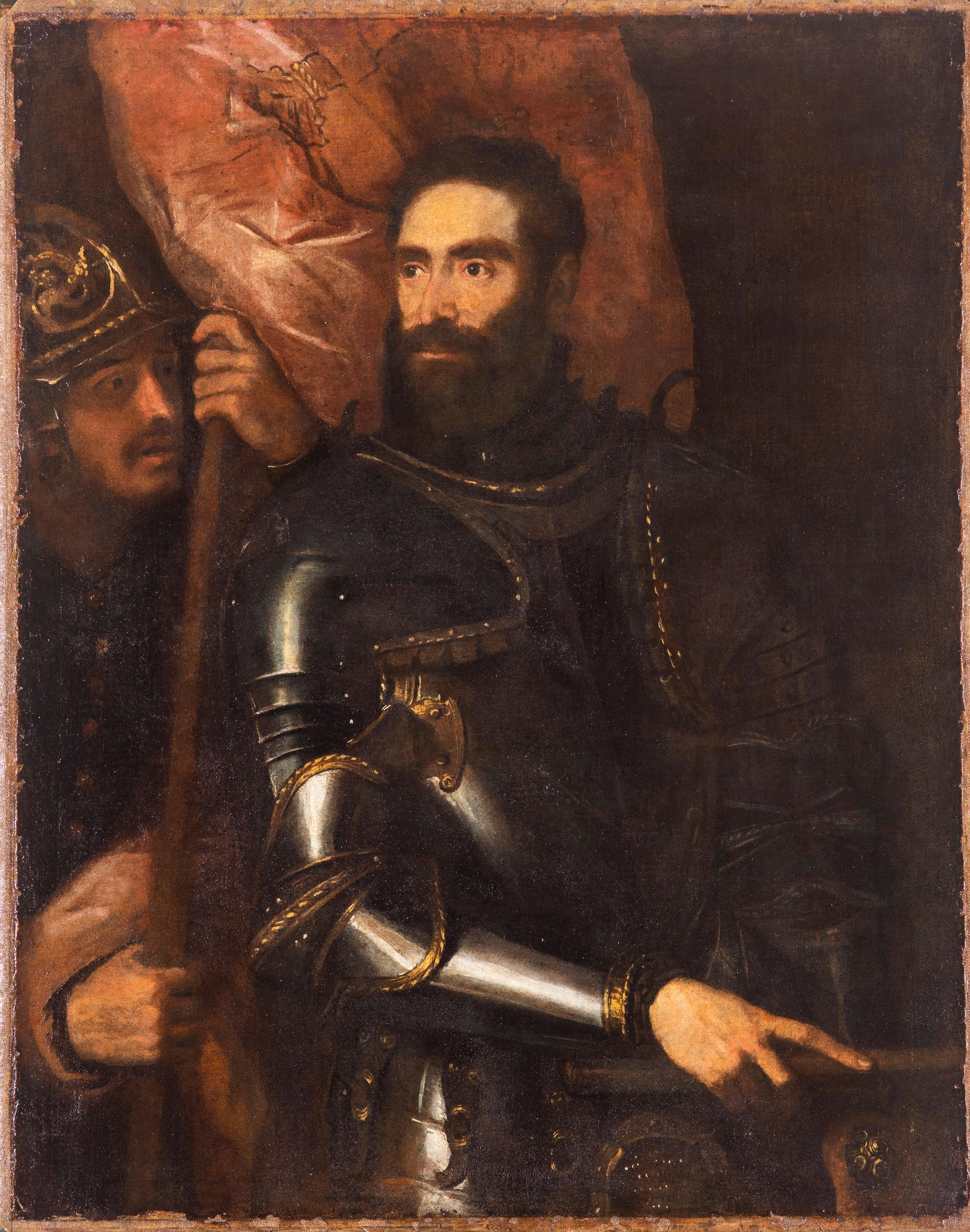
- Portrait of Pier Luigi Farnese by Titian, 1546

Duke of Parma and Piacenza
- Reign: 16 September 1545 – 10 September 1547
- Successor: Ottavio

Duke of Castro
- Reign: 14 March 1537 – 16 September 1545
- Successor: Ottavio
- Born: 19 November 1503; Rome, Papal States
- Died: 10 September 1547 (aged 43); Piacenza, Duchy of Parma and Piacenza
- Spouse: Gerolama Orsini
- Issue: Cardinal Alessandro; Ottavio, Duke of Parma; Cardinal Ranuccio; Vittoria, Duchess of Urbino; Orazio, Duke of Castro
- House: Farnese
- Father: Pope Paul III
- Mother: Silvia Ruffini

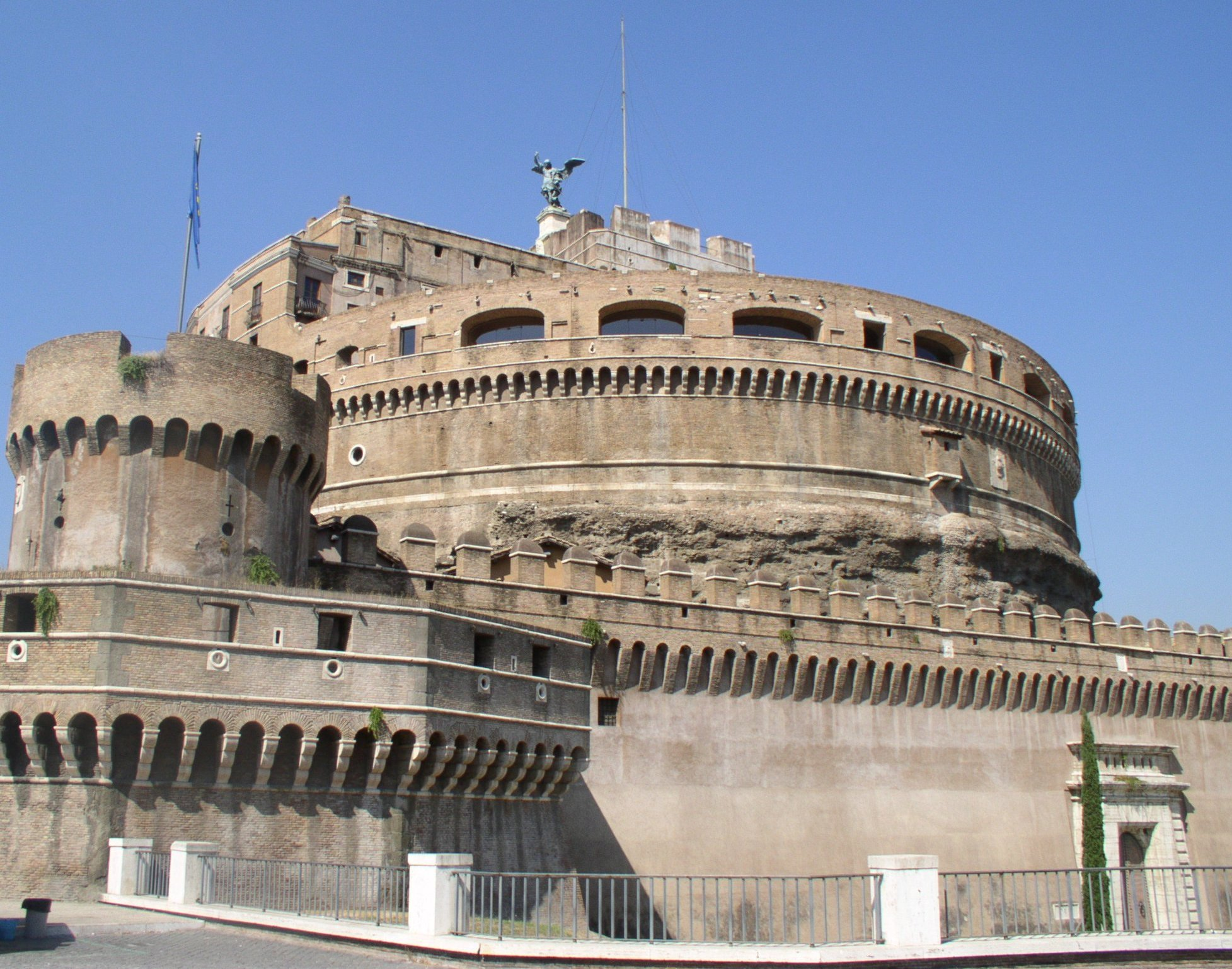
Castel Sant'Angelo, Rome

Pier Luigi Farnese (19 November 1503 – 10 September 1547) was the first Duke of Castro from 1537 to 1545 and the first Duke of Parma and Piacenza from 1545 to 1547. He was the illegitimate son of Cardinal Alessandro Farnese (who later became Pope Paul III). He became a soldier and participated in the Sack of Rome in 1527.

== Youth ==
Pier Luigi Alessandro Farnese, born in 1503, was the son of Cardinal Alessandro Farnese and Silvia Ruffini. His father would be elected Pope Paul III on 13 October 1534.

In July 1505, Pope Julius II legitimized Pier Luigi so that he could inherit the Farnese family estates. On 23 June, 1513, Pope Leo X published a second legitimation of Pier Luigi. In spite of the legitimations, his illegitimacy tormented Pier Luigi all his life, and doubtless contributed to the formation of his character. The nobility of Piacenza was frequently known to insult him as "the bastard son of the Pope." He was given a famous humanist tutor, Baldassarre Malosso di Casalmaggiore, nicknamed "Tranquillus," and quickly developed a love of war and fortifications.

His father was, however, keen to make Pier Luigi the true head of the Farnese family and so arranged a favourable marriage alliance with Gerolama (also known by the spelling Girolama) Orsini, daughter of Lodovico, Count of Pitigliano. In 1513 the engagement contract was drawn up, and in 1519 the wedding celebrated.

Despite a loveless marriage, Gerolama remained a faithful devoted wife, tolerating Pier Luigi's excesses, brutality, and extravagances with dignity. Delays in the construction at the palace in Gradoli, meant the young couple had to lodge in the Castle at Valentano. The following year their first son Alessandro was born.

== Military career ==
Pier Luigi Farnese became the stereotype of a mercenary soldier: wild and amoral. He was courageous and daring and while strong and audacious was also brutal to offend many observers. Nor did he fight on the traditional side of the papacy; reversing the pro Guelph sentiments of the Farnese.

In 1520, at the age of seventeen, he and his brother Ranuccio were already employed as mercenaries in the pay of the Republic of Venice. As a result, he served under the standard of Charles V — remaining with the emperor until 1527, he was present at the Sack of Rome of that year, in which he took part.

While his brother Ranuccio withdrew to Castel Sant'Angelo to defend the Pope; Pier Luigi crossed the Tiber and quartered his men in the family palace, thus saving it from destruction. Critics accused the Farnese of backing both sides, but Pope Clement VII refused to condemn him. Finally when the plague hit the city, the imperial troops decided to withdraw.

Pier Luigi withdrew from Rome into the Roman countryside, taxing it without mercy and permitting a climate of theft and murder. Pope Clement, tired of this behaviour, eventually threatened him with excommunication, until Cardinal Alexander tried diplomatically to reconcile his son with the pope. In 1528 Pier Luigi, still under imperial pay, fought in Apulia against the French army and distinguished himself in the defence of Manfredonia.

=== Captain General of the Church ===
When his father was elevated to the papacy as Paul III in 1534, great festivities were celebrated at Valentano, after which Pier Luigi left for Rome.

Paul's first action was to make Pier Luigi's eldest son, Alessandro Farnese, a cardinal. But Charles V only reluctantly allowed the granting of titles to Pier Luigi over the city of Novara, agreeing an annual pension on the condition that the news was not made public. In the hope of speeding things up, Pier Luigi took direct part in the negotiations while leading troops into the lands occupied by his Farnese relatives. Novara and its surrounding territory was finally established as a marquessate in favour of Pier Luigi, but had to wait until February 1538 until formal investiture could be made.

In the meantime the office of Captain General of the Church had become vacant, and Paul nominated his son on 31 January 1537. Pier Luigi travelled through the Papal States defeating pockets of resistance before arriving in triumph at Piacenza.

=== Duke of Castro ===
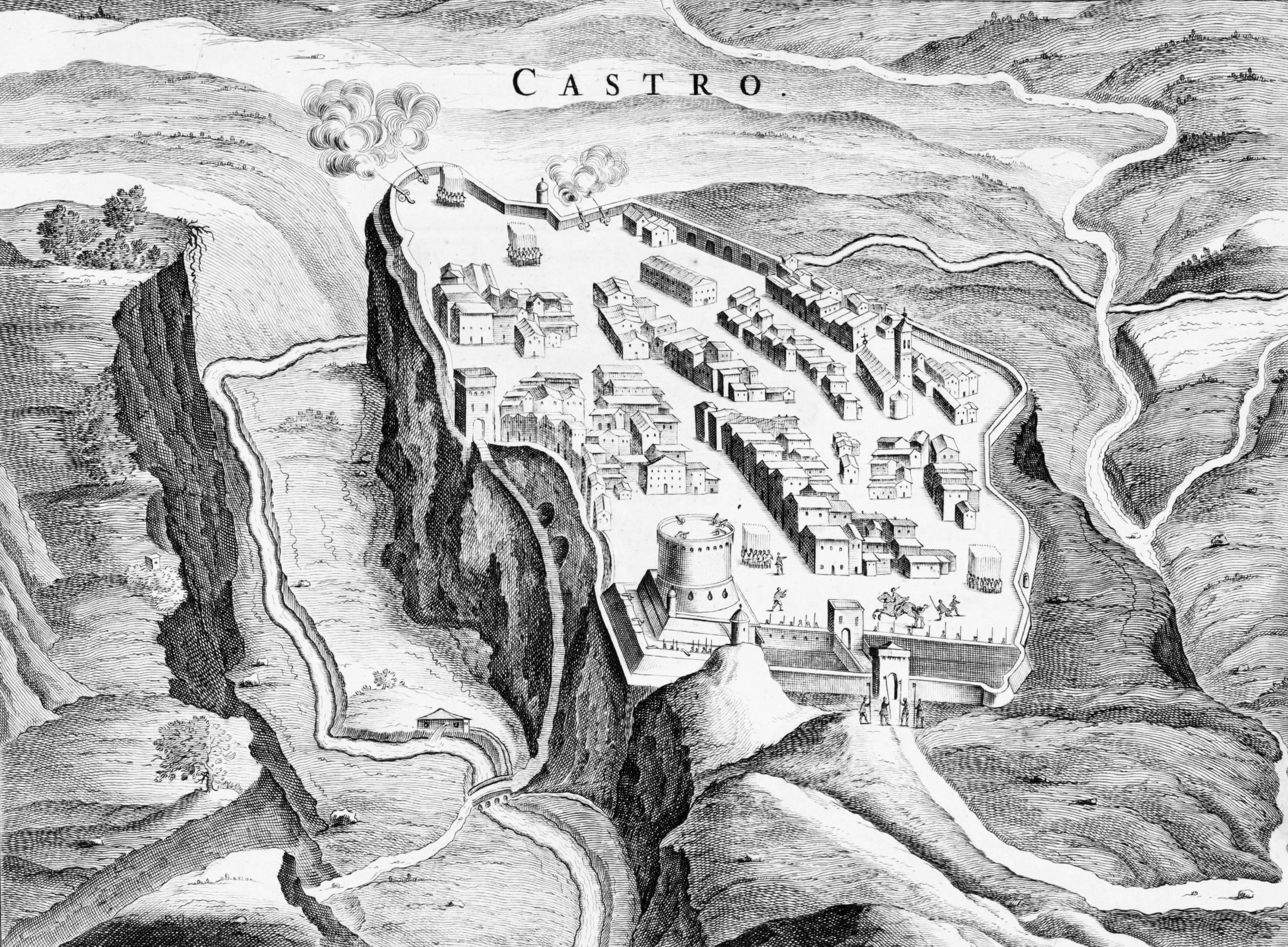
View of Castro (1663).

Meanwhile, Paul III gradually recovered the family lands around Castro which had been split after the death of Ranuccio the Elder. To this he added the territory of Ronciglione. Pier Luigi was invested with the titles of "Montalto" which gave the right to export grain without paying taxes; and Paul accepted feudal rights over Canine, Gradoli, Valentano, Latera and Marta. He exchanged the city of Frascati for the fortress at Castro, and at bought Bisenzio from the diocese of Montefiascone. As a final act, Paul created a formal duchy out of the lands and bestowed it upon his son and heirs. The duchy was, however, to come under the direct control of the Holy See.

The Duchy of Castro operated as a functioning State within the Patrimony of Saint Peter. It possessed rich forests full of game, fertile vineyards and fields, and a great number of fortresses. In the consistory of 14 March 1537, the Pope also awarded his son the cities of Nepi and Ronciglione. Pier Luigi was tasked with repairing all the fortresses over which he was now feudal lord. The new Duke commissioned Antonio da Sangallo the Younger to create a new capital, which saw the construction of a citadel, ducal palace and mint.

During his life Pier Luigi gained a certain reputation for cruelty, ruthlessness and decadence. A particular scandal erupted in 1537, when he was accused of what became known as the "rape of Fano", where he allegedly raped the young bishop of the city, Cosimo Gheri, while marching with his troops. Gheri subsequently died.

In 1538 his son Ottavio married Margaret of Parma, an illegitimate daughter of Emperor Charles V; thus consolidating the friendship between the Farnese and the imperial family. In 1543 another son, Orazio, was sent to France and eventually married Diane de France - an illegitimate daughter of Henry II of France. Finally in 1545 his third son, Ranuccio, was created a cardinal by Paul III.

=== Duke of Parma and Piacenza ===
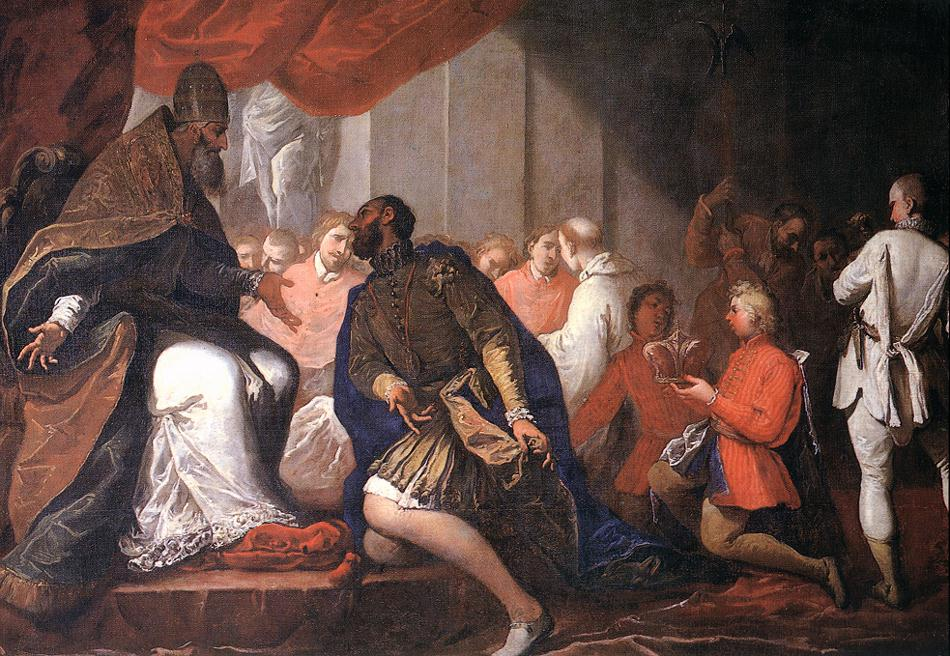
Pier Luigi appointed to Duke of Parma and Piacenza by Paul III

Paul III then went on to make Pier Luigi Duke of Parma and Piacenza, properties that had previously been a part of the Papal States. Pier Luigi and his son, Ottavio, declared they would pay 9,000 golden ducati every year to the treasury of the Holy See, and, in exchange, they gave back the Duchies of Camerino and Nepi. Pier Luigi took possession of his new states on 23 September 1546.

=== Conspiracy and death ===
His tyrannical rule and his taxes gained him the enmities of the cities, which were used to the more sensible authority of the Popes. In addition, Charles V, Holy Roman Emperor fostered discontent with the Duke, in part to further his aim of annexing Parma and Piacenza to the Duchy of Milan. Thus the governor of Milan, Ferrante Gonzaga, learning of the aims of the emperor, launched a plot against the Farnese, supported by the marquis Anguissola and Andrea Doria.

Ferrante began to spy on Pier Luigi and sent reports continually to the emperor in Madrid. Pier Luigi did not remain passive; on 4 June 1547 he arranged the marriage of his daughter, Vittoria, with Guidobaldo II della Rovere, the Duke of Urbino. He also continued to work hard on the fortifications of his lands. Charles, concerned about the progress of work in Parma, was persuaded to give free rein to Ferrante to organize a conspiracy against the duke. Marquis Pallavicini Cortemaggiore offered support; but Ferrante preferred to rely on his distant kinsman Louis Gonzaga, Lord of Castel Goffredo and Castiglione, and his brother Count Giovanni Anguissola, governor of Como. Anguissola was able to convince Count Agostino Landi, Marquis Giovan Luigi Confalonieri, and Girolamo Alessandro Pallavicini to join him. After Anguissola and others had stabbed him to death, the conspirators hung his body from a window of his palace in Piacenza. Charles V's vicar Ferrante Gonzaga captured the Duchy soon after, although subsequent events led to the return of the duchy to Pier-Luigi's son, Ottavio in 1551.

Following the death of his son, Pope Paul met in consistory and had Ferrante accused of the murder - declaring that Ottavio would succeed his father as the new duke and the new Gonfalonier of the Church. Pier Luigi's body was brought back and buried in Piacenza; later the body was transported to Parma by his wife Gerolama Orsini and then to the family tomb on the island of Bisentina on Lake Bolsena.

== Marriage and family ==
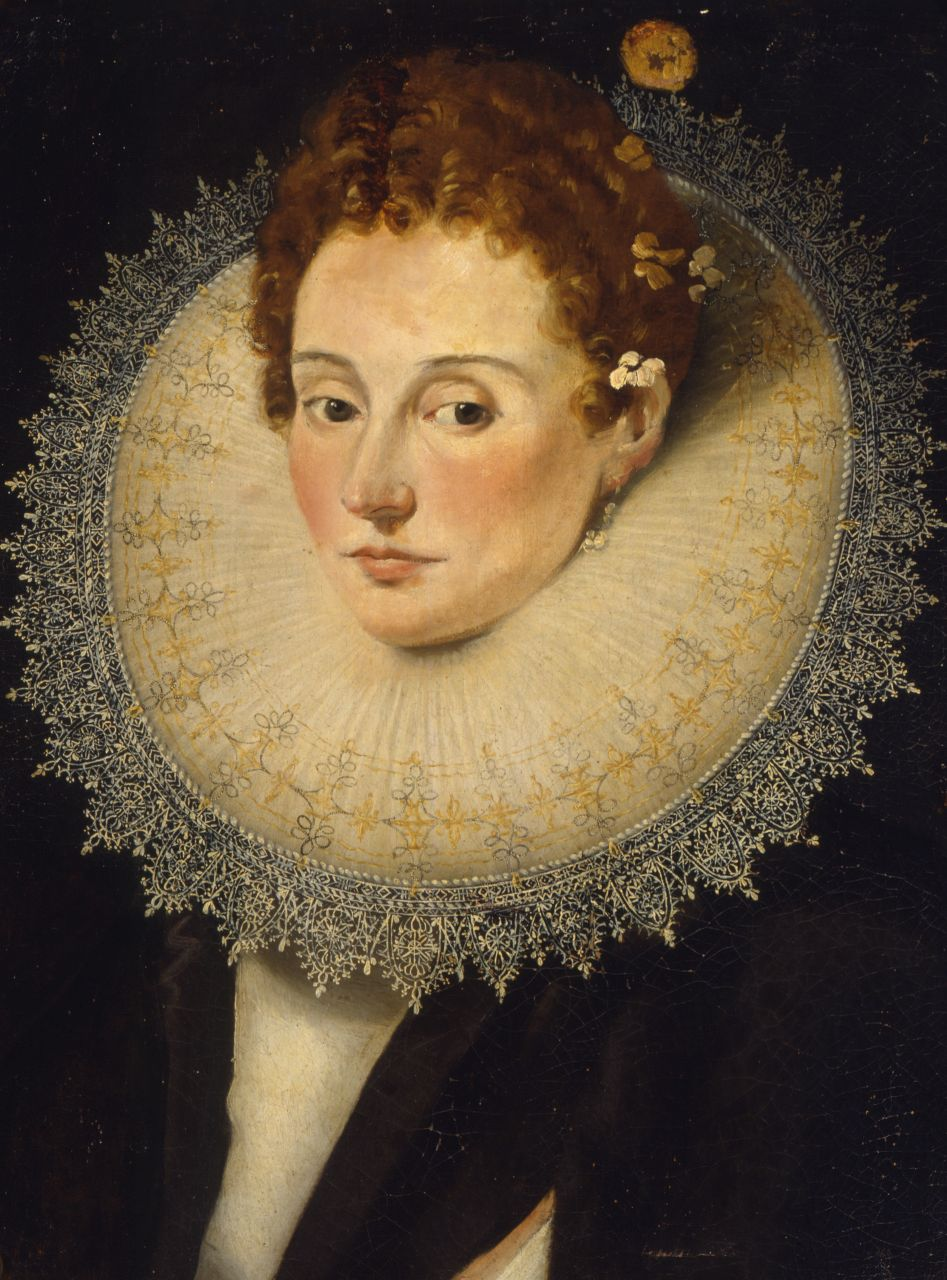
Gerolama Orsini, Pier Luigi's wife.

Pier Luigi Farnese had married Girolama Orsini, daughter of Luigi Orsini and wife and first cousin Giulia Conti and paternal granddaughter of the 6th Counts of Pitigliano. They had:

- Alessandro Farnese, the oldest son, bishop of Parma and Roman Catholic Cardinal
- Ottavio Farnese, Pier Luigi's successor as Duke of Parma
- Ranuccio Farnese, Roman Catholic Cardinal
- Vittoria Farnese, who married Guidubaldo II, Duke of Urbino
- Orazio, who married Diane de France, illegitimate daughter of Henry II of France.

Letters also exist from Pier Luigi's father, Paul III, reproaching him for taking male lovers when on an official mission to the court of the emperor; and another from the chancellor of the Florentine embassy detailing a man-hunt he had mounted in Rome to search for a youth who had refused his advances.

== See also ==
- Farnese
- Rape of Fano

== Sources ==
- Gamrath, Helge (2007). Farnese: Pomp, Power, and Politics in Renaissance Italy. L'Erma Di Bretschneider.
- de Vitoria, Francisco (1991). Pagden, Anthony; Lawrance, Jeremy (eds.). Vitoria: Political Writings. Cambridge University Press.
- Vorel, Petr (2025). The Italian Crusade to Germany in 1546: Pope Paul III's Campaign Against the Lutherans. Springer. ISBN 9783031966026.

Pier Luigi Farnese House of Farnese Born: 19 November 1503 Died: 10 September 1547
Regnal titles
New title Carved from the Papal States	Duke of Castro; 1537–1545	Succeeded by Ottavio
New title Carved from the Papal States	Duke of Parma and Piacenza; 1545–1547	Succeeded by Ottavio
