= Pope Paul III =

Head of the Catholic Church from 1534 to 1549

- Bishop of Rome
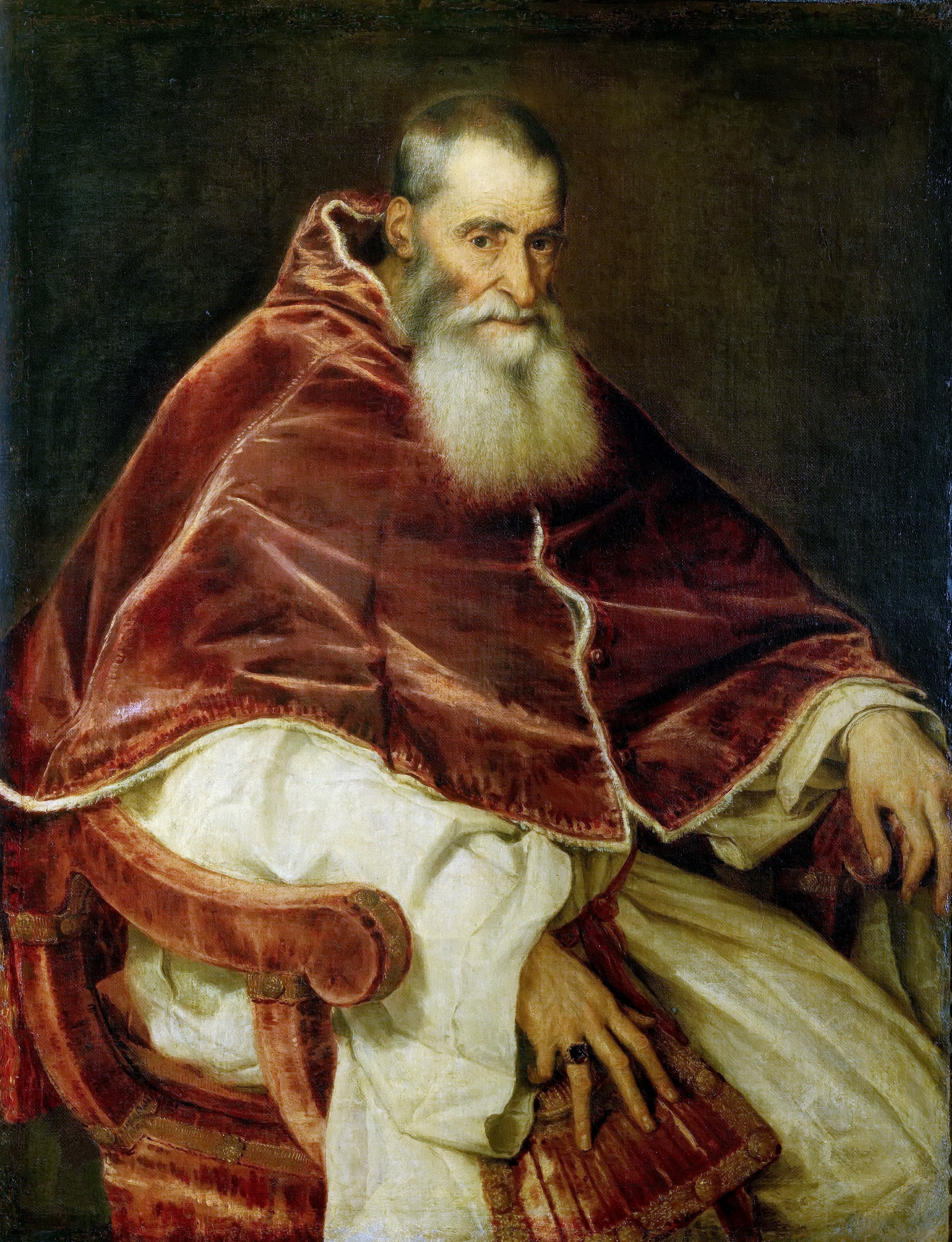
- Portrait of Pope Paul III, 1543
- Church: Catholic Church
- Papacy began: 13 October 1534
- Papacy ended: 10 November 1549
- Predecessor: Clement VII
- Successor: Julius III
- Previous posts: Cardinal-Deacon of Santi Cosma e Damiano (1493–1503); Bishop of Corneto and Montefiascone (1499–1509); Cardinal-Deacon of Sant'Eustachio (1503–1519); Archpriest of the Archbasilica of Saint John Lateran (1508–1534); Bishop of Parma (1509–1534); Protodeacon of the College of Cardinals (1516–1519); Cardinal-Bishop of Frascati (1519–1523); Cardinal-Bishop of Palestrina (1523); Cardinal-Bishop of Sabina (1523–1524); Cardinal-Bishop of Porto (1524); Cardinal-Bishop of Ostia (1524–1534); Vice-Dean of the College of Cardinals (1524); Dean of the College of Cardinals (1524–1534)

Orders
- Ordination: 26 June 1519
- Consecration: 2 July 1519 by Leo X
- Created cardinal: 20 September 1493 by Alexander VI

Personal details
- Born: Alessandro Farnese; 29 February 1468 Canino, Lazio, Papal States
- Died: 10 November 1549 (aged 81) Rome, Papal States
- Buried: St. Peter's Basilica
- Partner: Silvia Ruffini (mistress)
- Children: Pier Luigi II Farnese; Paolo Farnese; Ranuccio Farnese; Costanza Farnese

- Coat of arms

Papal styles of Pope Paul III
- Reference style: His Holiness
- Spoken style: Your Holiness
- Religious style: Holy Father
- Posthumous style: None

Pope Paul III (Latin: Paulus III; Italian: Paolo III; born Alessandro Farnese; 29 February 1468 – 10 November 1549) was head of the Catholic Church and ruler of the Papal States from 13 October 1534 to his death, in November 1549.

Paul III came to the papal throne in the time following the sack of Rome in 1527, which was rife with uncertainties in the Catholic Church as the Protestant Reformation progressed and the Ottoman Empire threatened Christian frontiers. He called the Holy League of 1538 to relieve the Republic of Venice from Ottoman expansionism, recruiting Holy Roman Emperor Charles V. Despite highly ambitious outlooks, the League fell into infighting and disbanded without much success.

His pontificate also initiated the Catholic Reformation with the Council of Trent in 1545, and witnessed wars of religion in which Charles V launched military campaigns against the Protestants in Germany. He recognized new Catholic religious orders and societies such as the Jesuits, the Barnabites, and the Congregation of the Oratory. His efforts were distracted by nepotism to advance the power and fortunes of his family, including his illegitimate son Pier Luigi Farnese.

Paul III was a significant patron of artists, including Michelangelo, and Nicolaus Copernicus dedicated his heliocentric treatise to him.

== Biography ==
=== Early career and family ===
Born in 1468 at Canino, Latium (then part of the Papal States), Alessandro Farnese was the second son of Pier Luigi I Farnese, Signore di Montalto (1435–1487) and Giovanna Caetani, a member of the Caetani family which had produced Pope Gelasius II and Pope Boniface VIII. The Farnese family had prospered over the centuries, but it was Alessandro's ascendency to the papacy and his dedication to family interests which brought about the most significant increase in the family's wealth and power.

Alessandro was given a humanist education at the University of Pisa and the court of Lorenzo de' Medici. Initially trained as an apostolic notary, he joined the Roman Curia in 1491 and in 1493 Pope Alexander VI appointed him Cardinal-Deacon of Santi Cosma e Damiano. Alessandro's sister, Giulia, was reputedly a mistress of Alexander VI, and might have been instrumental in securing this appointment for her brother. For this reason, he was sometimes mockingly referred to as the "Borgia brother-in-law", just as Giulia was mocked as "the Bride of Christ". Much later (in 1535), the Venetian nobleman Soriano recorded that Alessandro was called cardinale Fregnese (Cardinal Pussy, or Cardinal Cunt) on account of the relationship between his sister and Alexander VI.

As a young cleric, Alessandro lived a notably dissolute life, taking a mistress, Silvia Ruffini. Between about 1500 and 1510, she gave birth to at least four children: Costanza, Pier Luigi (who was later created Duke of Parma), Paolo, and Ranuccio. In July 1505, Pope Julius II legitimated the two eldest sons so that they could inherit the Farnese family estates. On 23 June 1513, Pope Leo X published a second legitimation of Pier Luigi, and also legitimized Ranuccio (the second son Paolo had already died).

On 28 March 1509, Alessandro was named Bishop of Parma, but he was not ordained a priest until 26 June 1519 and not consecrated a bishop until 2 July 1519. As Bishop of Parma, he came under the influence of his vicar-general, Bartolomeo Guidiccioni. This led to Alessandro breaking off the relationship with his mistress and committing himself to reform in his diocese. Under Pope Clement VII (1523–1534) he was named Cardinal Bishop of Ostia and Dean of the College of Cardinals.

== Pontificate ==
=== Papal election ===
On the death of Clement VII in 1534, he was elected as Pope Paul III on 13 October 1534. Farnese, who did not fall within any of the factions, was considered a very good choice by the cardinals since his state of health denoted a short papacy which would give those cardinals time to select a proper candidate for a future conclave. On 3 November, Paul III was formally crowned by the protodeacon Innocenzo Cybo.

The elevation to the cardinalate of his grandsons, Alessandro Farnese, aged 14, and Guido Ascanio Sforza, aged 16, displeased the reform party and drew a protest from Emperor Charles V, but this was forgiven when, shortly after, he introduced into the Sacred College Reginald Pole, Gasparo Contarini, Jacopo Sadoleto, and Giovanni Pietro Caraffa, who would become Pope Paul IV.

Pope Paul III and his Grandsons Cardinal Alessandro Farnese (left), and Ottavio Farnese, Duke of Parma (right), II Duke of Parma since 1547. A triple portrait by Titian, 1546

=== Politics and religion ===
The fourth pope during the period of the Protestant Reformation, Paul III became the first to take active reform measures in response to Protestantism. Soon after his elevation, 2 June 1536, Paul III summoned a general council to meet at Mantua in the following May, but the opposition of the Protestant princes and the refusal of Federico II Gonzaga, Duke of Mantua to assume the responsibility of maintaining order frustrated the project. Paul III first deferred for a year and then discarded the whole project.

In 1536, Paul III invited a committee of nine eminent prelates, distinguished by learning and piety alike, to report on the reformation and rebuilding of the Church. In 1537 they produced the celebrated Consilium de emendenda ecclesia, exposing gross abuses in the Roman Curia, the church administration, and public worship; and proffering bold proposals aimed at abolishing such abuses. The report was widely printed, and the pope was in earnest when he took up the problem of reform. He clearly perceived that Emperor Charles V would not rest until the problems had truly been addressed.

However, to the Protestants, the report seemed far from thorough; Martin Luther had his edition (1538) prefaced with a vignette showing the cardinals cleaning the Augean stable of the Roman Church with foxtails instead of brooms. In the end, no results followed from the committee's recommendations.

In 1534, a decision by Paul III favoured the activity of merchants of all nationalities and religions from the Levant and allowed them to settle with their families in Ancona, which had become part of the Papal States under his predecessor Clement VII. This decision helped make Ancona a prosperous trading city for centuries to come. A Venetian travelling through Ancona in 1535 recorded that the city was "full of merchants from every nation and mostly Greeks and Turks." In the second half of the 16th century, the presence of Greek and other merchants from the Ottoman Empire declined after a series of restrictive measures taken by the Italian authorities and the pope.

Paul III was highly involved in the 1538 Holy League against the Ottoman Empire, comprising mainly Emperor Charles V and Venice. He had also tried to recruit King Francis I of France, but could only obtain from him a temporary pause in the Franco-Ottoman alliance. In turn, the pope offered Charles V to make him Byzantine emperor too if they managed to reconquer Constantinople. When the Holy League's fleet was routed during the confusing battle of Preveza, Paul even considered to join the conflict personally in a reinforcement fleet. On October, he approved the Treaty of Nagyvárad and urged Charles to lead the Holy League to an attack on Ottoman territory, but the league dissolved shortly after.

As a consequence of the extensive campaign against "idolatry" in England, culminating with the dismantling of the shrine of St. Thomas Becket at Canterbury, Paul III excommunicated Henry VIII on 17 December 1538 and issued an interdict on England.

Around this time, family complications arose. In order to vest his grandson Ottavio Farnese with the Duchy of Camerino, Paul forcibly wrested the same from the duke of Urbino (1540). He also incurred virtual war with his own subjects and vassals by the imposition of burdensome taxes. Perugia, renouncing its obedience, was besieged by Paul's son, Pier Luigi, and forfeited its freedom entirely on its surrender. The burghers of Colonna were duly vanquished, and Ascanio was banished (1541). After this, the time seemed ripe for annihilating heresy.

In 1540, the Church officially recognized the society forming about Ignatius of Loyola, which became the Society of Jesus. In 1542, a second stage in the process of Counter-Reformation was marked by the institution, or reorganization, of the Congregation of the Holy Office of the Inquisition.

On another side, the emperor was insisting that Rome should forward his designs toward a peaceable recovery of the German Protestants. Accordingly, Paul III despatched Giovanni Morone (not as yet a cardinal) as nuncio to Hagenau and Worms in 1540; and in 1541 Cardinal Gasparo Contarini took part in the adjustment proceedings at the Conference of Regensburg. It was Contarini who proposed the famous formula "by faith alone are we justified," which did not, however, supersede the Roman Catholic doctrine of good works. At Rome, this definition was rejected in the consistory of 27 May, and Luther declared that he could accept it only provided the opposers would admit that this formula constituted a change of doctrine.

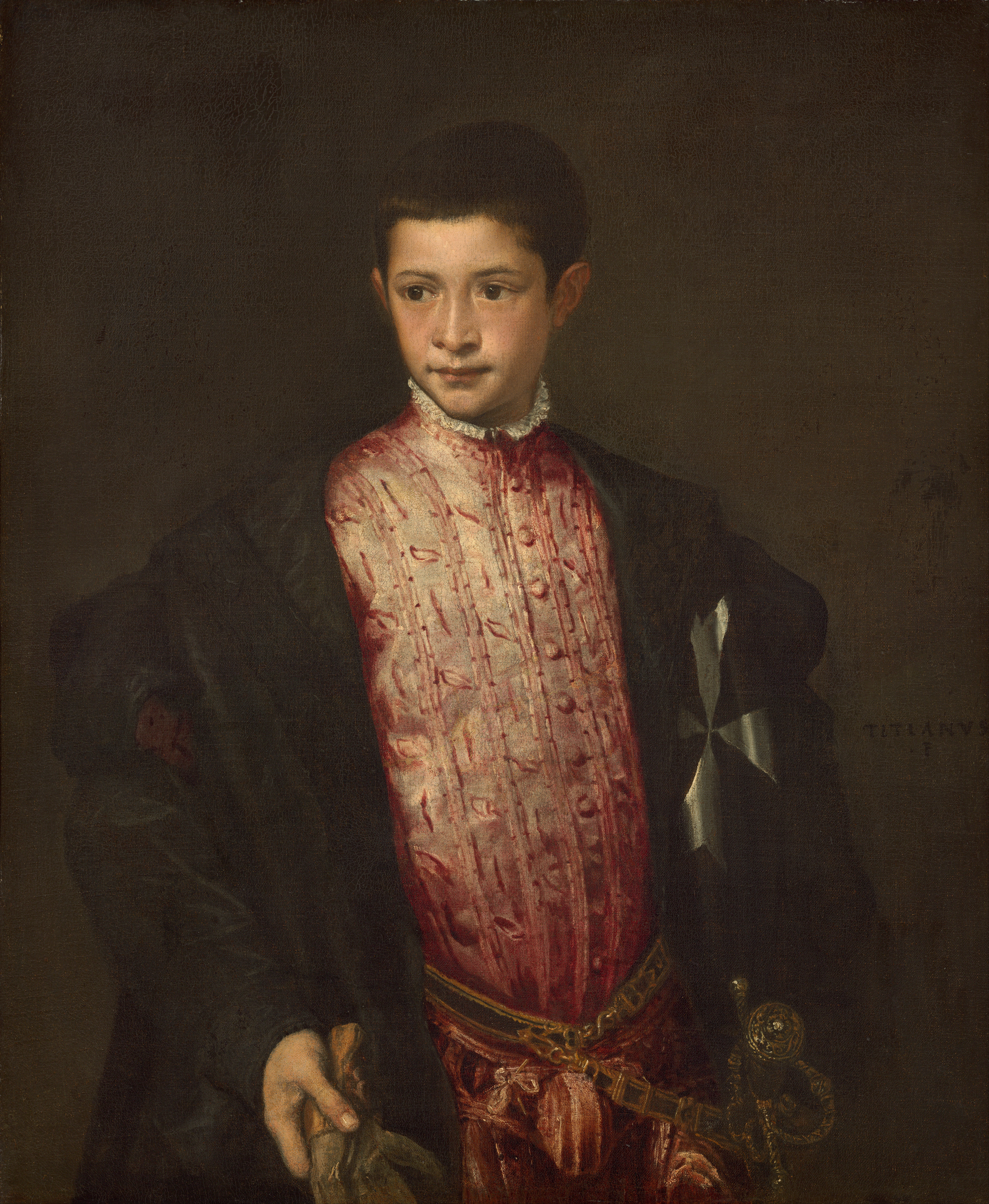
Ranuccio Farnese was made cardinal by Paul III at the age of 15.

However, after the Regensburg Conference had proved fruitless, the emperor insisted on a still larger council, with the final result being the Council of Trent, which finally was convoked on 15 March 1545, under the bull Laetare Hierusalem.

Meanwhile, after the peace of Crespy (September 1544), Emperor Charles V (1519–1556) began to put down Protestantism by force. Pending the Diet of Worms in 1545, the emperor concluded a covenant of joint action with the papal legate Cardinal Alessandro Farnese, with Paul III agreeing to aid in the projected war against the German Protestant princes and estates. This prompt acquiescence was probably grounded on personal motives: because the emperor was preoccupied in Germany, the moment now seemed opportune for the pope to acquire for his son Pier Luigi the duchies of Parma and Piacenza. Although these belonged to the Papal States, Paul III planned to overcome the reluctance of the cardinals by exchanging these papal duchies for the less valuable domains of Camerino and Nepi. The emperor agreed, welcoming the prospect of 12,000 infantry, 500 cavalry, and considerable funds from the pope.

In Germany the campaign began in the west, where Archbishop of Cologne Hermann of Wied had converted to Protestantism in 1542. Emperor Charles began open warfare against the Protestant princes, estates, and cities allied in the Schmalkaldic League (see Philip of Hesse). Hermann was excommunicated on 16 April 1546 and compelled by the emperor to abdicate in February 1547. By the close of 1546, Charles V had subjugated South Germany. The victory at the Battle of Mühlberg on 24 April 1547 established his imperial sovereignty everywhere in Germany, and the two leaders of the League were captured. The emperor declared the Augsburg Interim as a magnanimous compromise with the defeated schismatics.

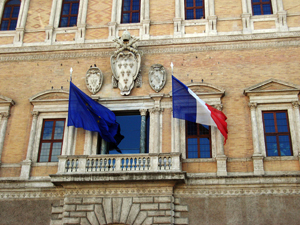
The Farnese coat of arms or stemma on the facade of the Farnese Palace in Rome

Although the emperor had subdued the German Protestant armies, he had failed to support the pope's territorial ambitions for his son Pier Luigi, and relations between them cooled. The situation came to a total rupture when Ferrante Gonzaga, the imperial vice-regent, forcibly expelled Pier Luigi.

In 1547, the pope's son was assassinated at Piacenza, and Paul III placed some of the blame on the emperor and his Italian vassals. In the same year, and after the death of Francis I of France (1515–1547) deprived the pope of a potential ally, the stress of circumstances compelled him to accept the ecclesiastical measures in the emperor's Interim.

With reference to the assassinated prince's inheritance, the restitution of which Paul III demanded ostensibly in the name of the church, the pope's design was thwarted by the emperor, who refused to surrender Piacenza, and by Pier Luigi's heir in Parma, Ottavio Farnese.

In consequence of a violent altercation on this account with Cardinal Farnese, Paul III, at the age of 81, became so overwrought that an attack of sickness ensued from which he died on 10 November 1549.

Paul III proved unable to suppress the Protestant Reformation, but it was during his pontificate that the foundation was laid for the Counter-Reformation. He decreed the second and final excommunication of Henry VIII of England in December 1538. His efforts in Parma led to the War of Parma two years after his death.

=== Slavery and Sublimis Deus ===
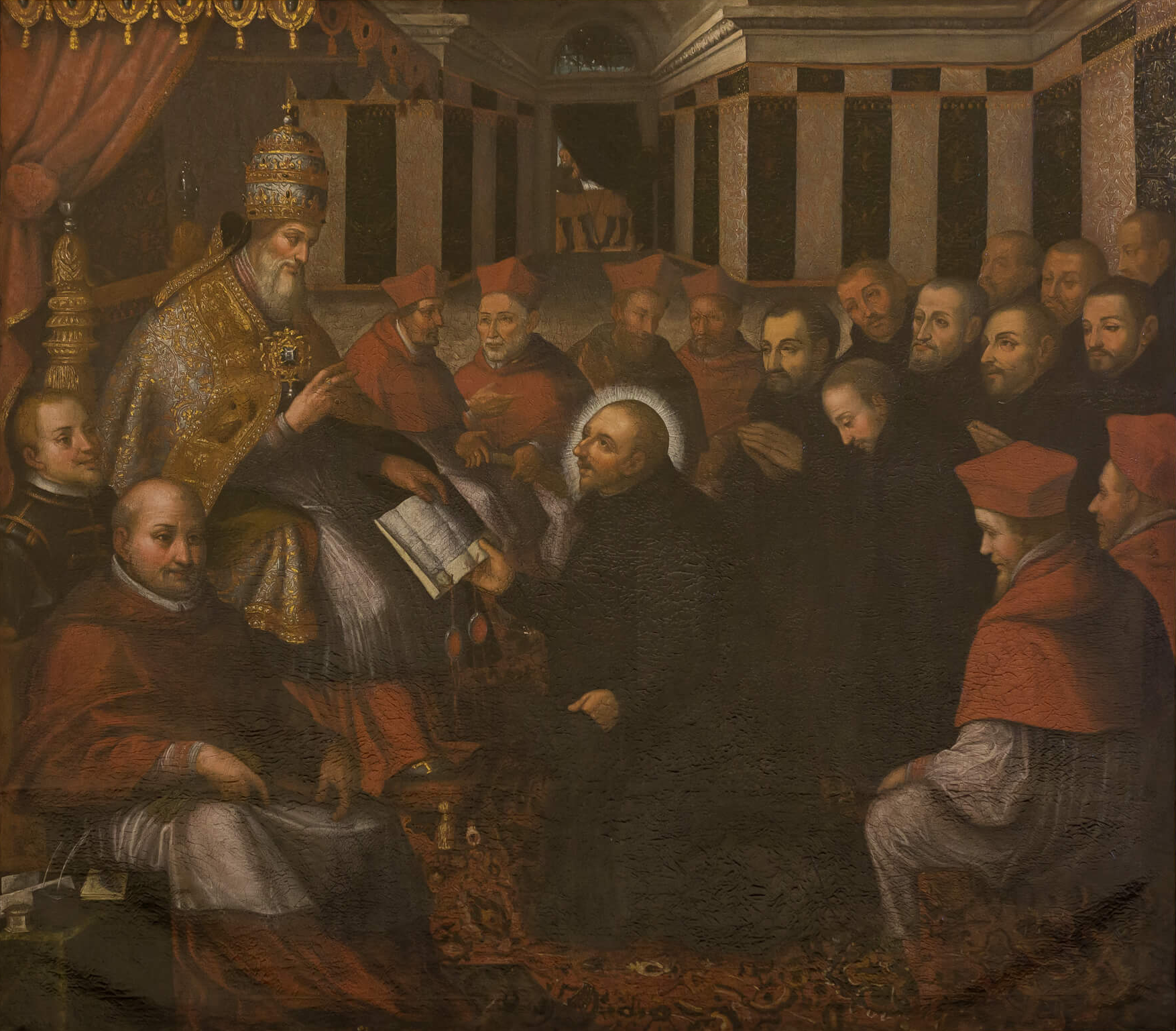
Pope Paul III approves the Society of Jesus, c. 1640, by Domingos da Cunha.

In May–June 1537, Paul issued the bull Sublimis Deus (also known as Unigenitus and Veritas ipsa), described by Prein (2008) as the "Magna Carta" for the human rights of the indigenous peoples of the Americas in its declaration that "the Indians were human beings and they were not to be robbed of their freedom or possessions". The subsequent implementing document Pastorale officium declared automatic excommunication for anyone who failed to abide by the new ruling.

However, it met with strong opposition from the Council of the West Indies and the Crown, which declared that it violated their patronato rights, and the pope annulled the orders the following year with the document Non Indecens Videtur. Stogre (1992) notes that Sublimis Deus is not present in Denzinger, the authoritative compendium of official Catholic teachings, and Davis (1988) asserts it was annulled due to a dispute with the Spanish crown. However, the original bull continued to circulate and be quoted by las Casas and others who supported Indian rights.

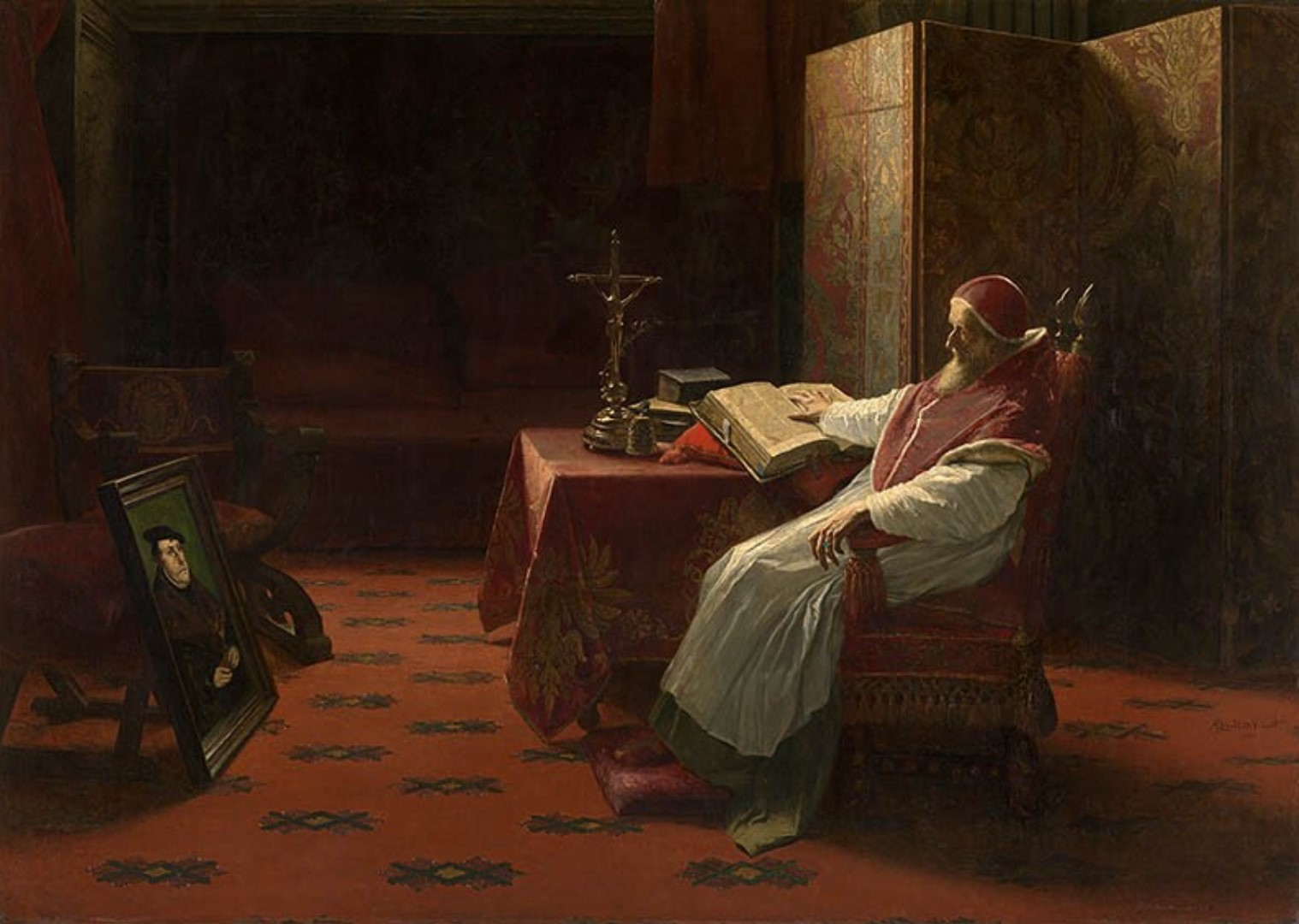
Pope Paul III in front of the Portrait of Luther by Albrecht De Vriendt

According to Falkowski (2002) Sublimis Deus had the effect of revoking the bull of Alexander VI, Inter caetera, but still leaving the colonizers the duty of converting the native people. Father Gustavo Gutierrez describes it as "the most important papal document relating to the condition of native Indians and that it was addressed to all Christians". Maxwell (1975) notes that the bull did not change the traditional teaching that the enslavement of Indians was permissible if they were considered "enemies of Christendom", as this would be considered by the Church as a "just war". The pope further argues that the Indian nations had every right to self-defence. Stark describes the bull as "magnificent" and believes that it was long forgotten due to the neglect of Protestant historians. Falola noted that the bull related to the native populations of the New World and did not condemn the transatlantic slave trade stimulated by the Spanish monarchy and the Holy Roman Emperor.

In 1545, Paul repealed an ancient law that allowed slaves to claim their freedom under the emperor's statue on Rome's Capitoline Hill, in view of the number of homeless people and tramps in the city. The decree included those who had become Christians after their enslavement and those born to Christian slaves. The right of inhabitants of Rome to publicly buy and sell slaves of both sexes was affirmed. Stogre (1992) asserts that the lifting of restrictions was due to a shortage of slaves in Rome. In 1548, Paul authorized the purchase and possession of Muslim slaves in the Papal states.

Also in 1537, Paul issued Altitudo divini consilii. This bull discusses evangelization and conversion, including the real way to apply the sacraments, in particular baptism. This was especially important in the early days of colonial rule, when hundreds and sometimes thousands of indigenous people were baptized every day. One interesting aspect of this bull is its discussion of how to deal with local practices, for example, polygamy. After their conversion, polygamous men had to marry their first wife, but if they could not remember which wife was the first, they then "could choose among the wives the one they preferred."

=== Patron of the arts ===
Arguably the most significant artistic work produced during Paul's reign was the Last Judgement by Michelangelo in the Sistine Chapel of the Vatican Palace. Although the work was commissioned by Paul III's predecessor, Pope Clement VII, following the latter's death in 1534 Paul renewed the commission and oversaw its completion in 1541.

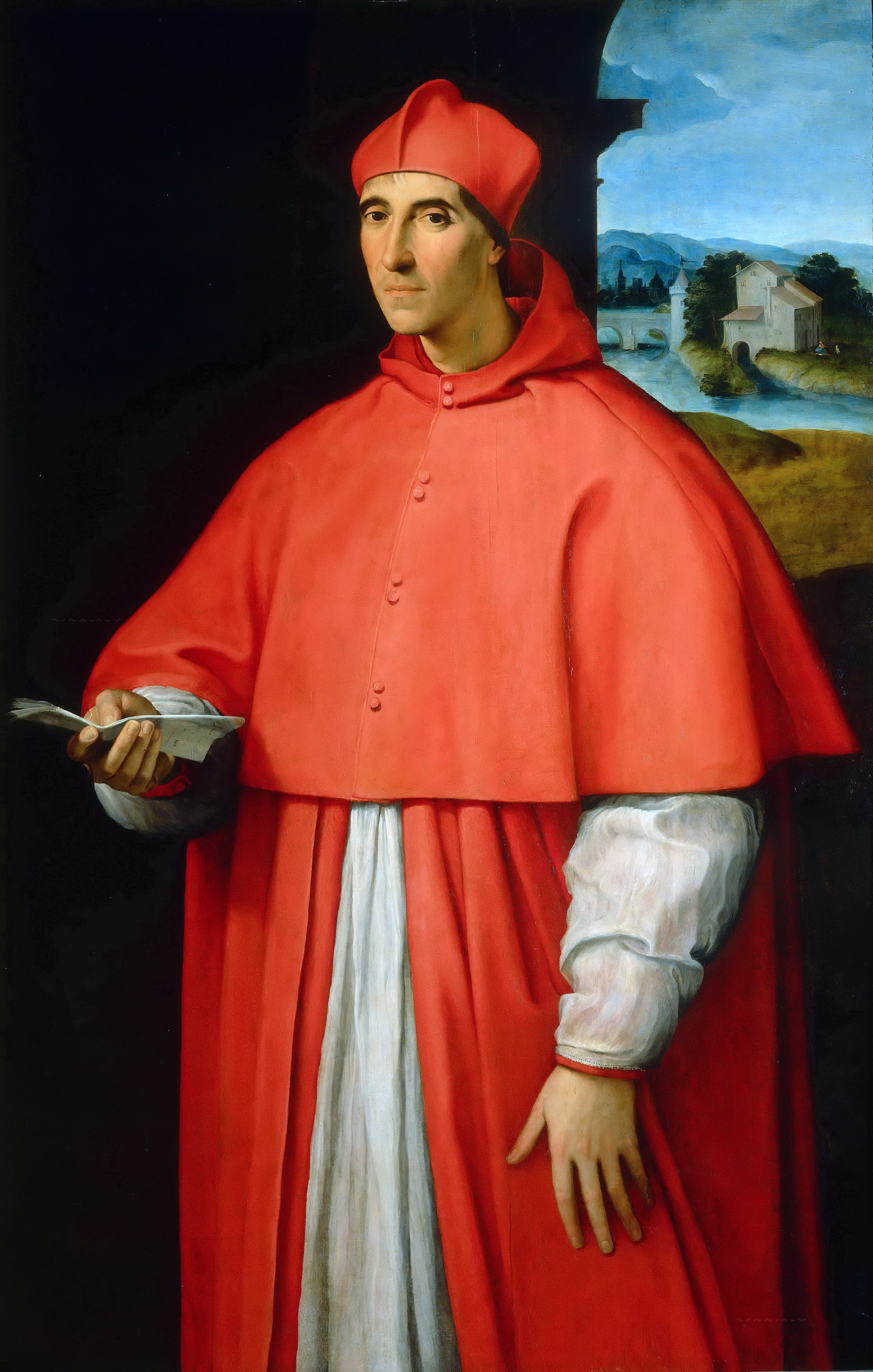
Portrait of Cardinal Alessandro Farnese (Later Pope Paul III) by Raphael, 1512.

As a cardinal, Alessandro had begun construction of the Palazzo Farnese in central Rome, and its planned size and magnificence increased upon his election to the papacy. The palace was initially designed by the architect Antonio da Sangallo the Younger, received further architectural refinement from Michelangelo, and was completed by Giacomo della Porta. Like other Farnese family buildings, the imposing palace proclaims the family's power and wealth, similarly to Alessandro's Villa Farnese at Caprarola. In 1546, after the death of Sangallo, Paul appointed the elderly Michelangelo to take supervision of the building of St. Peter's Basilica. Paul also commissioned Michelangelo to paint the Crucifixion of St. Peter and the Conversion of St. Paul (1542–1550), his last frescoes, in the Pauline Chapel of the Vatican.

Paul III's artistic and architectural commissions were numerous and varied. The Venetian artist Titian painted a portrait of the pope in 1543, and in 1546, the well-known portrait of Paul III with his grandsons Cardinal Alessandro Farnese and Ottavio Farnese, Duke of Parma. Both are now in the Capodimonte Museum in Naples. The military fortifications in Rome and the Papal States were strengthened during his reign. He had Michelangelo move the ancient bronze of the Emperor Marcus Aurelius to the Capitoline Hill, where it became the centerpiece to the Piazza del Campidoglio.

=== Other activities ===
==== Society of Jesus and religious orders ====
On 27 September 1540, Paul III formally approved the establishment of the Society of Jesus in the papal bull, Regimini militantis Ecclesiae. Originally, Paul III restricted the fledgling order to 60 members in the bull Iniunctum nobis, but he lifted that restriction upon seeing just how effective they were in their missionary actions. In 1548, he permitted Saint Ignatius of Loyola to print his Spiritual Exercises.

Similarly, in 1540, Paul III approved the Rule of the Somaschi Fathers, and on 9 June 1544, he approved the Rule for the Ursulines in the bull Regimini Universalis.

==== Consistories ====
Throughout his papacy, Paul III elevated 71 cardinals in 12 consistories. Six of those whom he named, and later revealed publicly, were nominated "in pectore". Among those he named were his three immediate successors: Giovanni Maria Ciocchi del Monte (the future Pope Julius III), Marcello Cervini (the future Pope Marcellus II), and Gian Pietro Carafa (the future Pope Paul IV). Among those he named were Reginald Pole, Rodrigo Luis de Borja y de Castre-Pinós (the great-great-grandson of Pope Alexander VI), Ippolito II d'Este (the grandson of Pope Alexander VI), and Enrique de Borja y Aragón (the great-grandson of Pope Alexander VI). Paul III also named John Fisher as a cardinal, but King Henry VIII had him executed after warning the pope not to nominate him.

In 1535, Paul III intended to nominate Desiderius Erasmus to the cardinalate, but he declined on the grounds of ill health and his age. In preparations for the 1542 consistory, Paul III intended to nominate Giovanni Guidiccioni, but the latter died before the consistory took place. In that 1542 consistory, according to Conradus Eubel, the pope is said to have reserved an undefined number of other cardinals in pectore.

==== Canonizations ====
During his papacy, Paul III canonized Ginés de la Jara (1541).

== Death ==
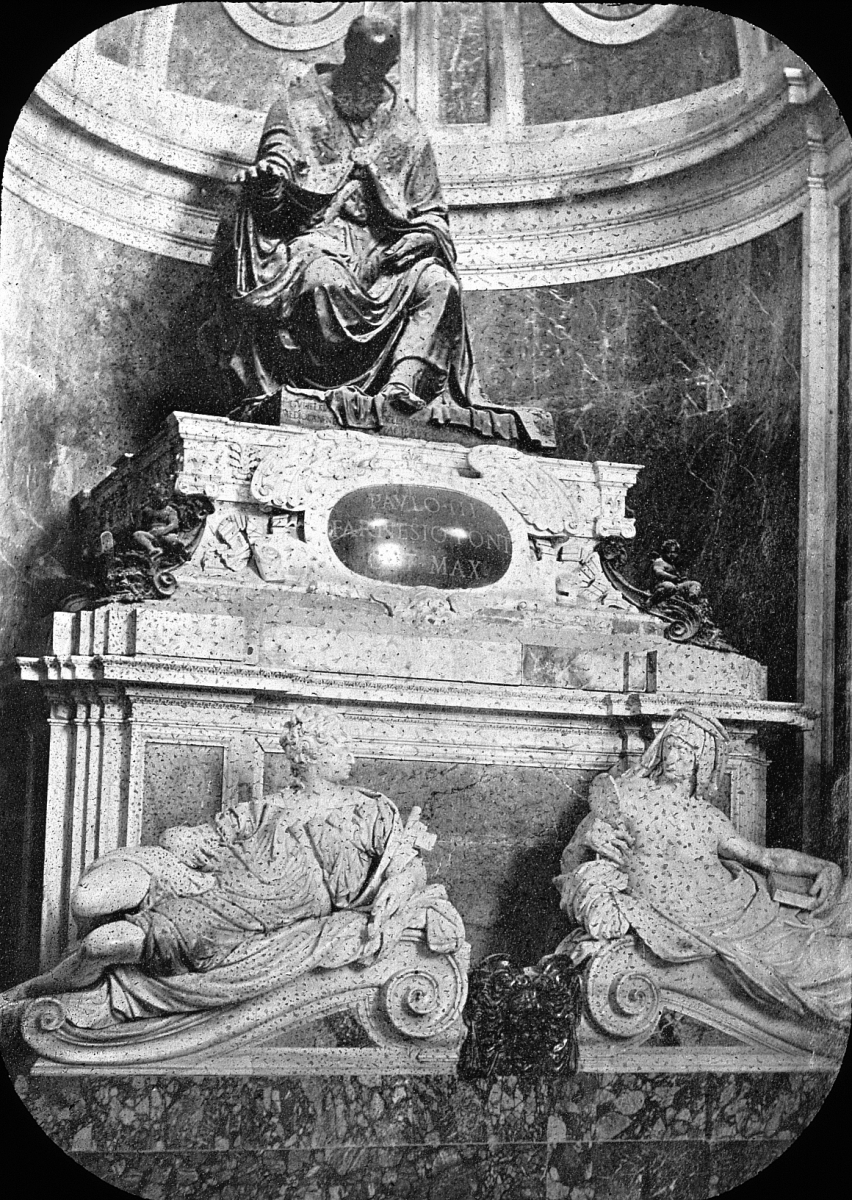
Rome, Italy. St. Peter's, tomb of Paul III. Brooklyn Museum Archives, Goodyear Archival Collection.

On 3 November 1549, Paul III celebrated the anniversary of his papal coronation. However, the pope was severely depressed by the deceit of his own family and the fall of Parma to Emperor Charles V, and it is known that he had a very heated argument with his cardinal nephew, Alessandro Farnese, to the point that he grabbed his red beretta, tore it into shreds, and threw it down to the ground in his anger. He had worked himself up so much to the point that he may have suffered a heart attack. On 6 November, the pope suddenly contracted a fever, retreating to the Quirinal Hill where he had hoped that the fresher air would help ease his malady. On 7 November, the agent of King Ferdinand I of Bohemia and Hungary, Diego Lasso, wrote that the pope's temperature had increased that morning, while the French ambassador in Rome reported to King Henry II of France that Paul III suffered from a catarrh at 7:00 pm, opining that the pope had very little time to live.

Paul III died on 10 November 1549 from a catarrh. It is said that he repented of his nepotism on his deathbed.

Paul III's bronze tomb, executed by Guglielmo della Porta, is located in Saint Peter's Basilica.

== Fictional portrayal ==
Stendhal's novel La Chartreuse de Parme was inspired by an inauthentic Italian account of the dissolute youth of Alessandro Farnese.

The character of Pope Paul III, played by Peter O'Toole, in the series The Tudors is loosely inspired by him. The young Alessandro Farnese is played by Diarmuid Noyes in the serial Borgia and by Cyron Melville in The Borgias. His image is portrayed in a parody of the Sgt. Pepper's Lonely Hearts Club Band album cover, placed inside of the album We're Only in It for the Money by the Mothers of Invention.

== See also ==
- Catholic Church in the Azores, diocese created by Pope Paul III in 1534
- Cardinals created by Paul III
- Mérindol massacre, supported by Paul III

== Notes ==
Catholic Church titles
Preceded by Philippe de Luxembourg	Cardinal-bishop of Frascati; 1519–1523	Succeeded by François Guillaume de Castelnau-Clermont-Ludève
Preceded by Francesco Soderini	Cardinal-bishop of Palestrina; 1523	Succeeded by Antonio Maria Ciocchi del Monte
Preceded by Niccolò Fieschi	Cardinal-bishop of Sabina; 1523–1524	Succeeded by Pietro Accolti
Preceded by Domenico Grimani	Cardinal-bishop of Porto; 1524	Succeeded by Antonio Maria Ciocchi del Monte
Preceded by Niccolò Fieschi	Cardinal-bishop of Ostia; 1524–1534	Succeeded by Giovanni Piccolomini
Preceded by Niccolò Fieschi	Dean of the College of Cardinals; 1524–1534	Succeeded by Giovanni Piccolomini
Preceded by Clement VII	Pope; 13 October 1534 – 10 November 1549	Succeeded by Julius III
