= Volsinii (disambiguation) =

Volsinii, Volsini or Vulsini can refer to the following items:

- Volsinii, ancient name for Bolsena
- Monti Volsini, a mountain range near Lake Bolsena
- Vulsini, a volcanic caldera complex in Italy

== See also ==
- Bolsena (disambiguation)
