= Gradoli =

- Comune
- Comune di Gradoli
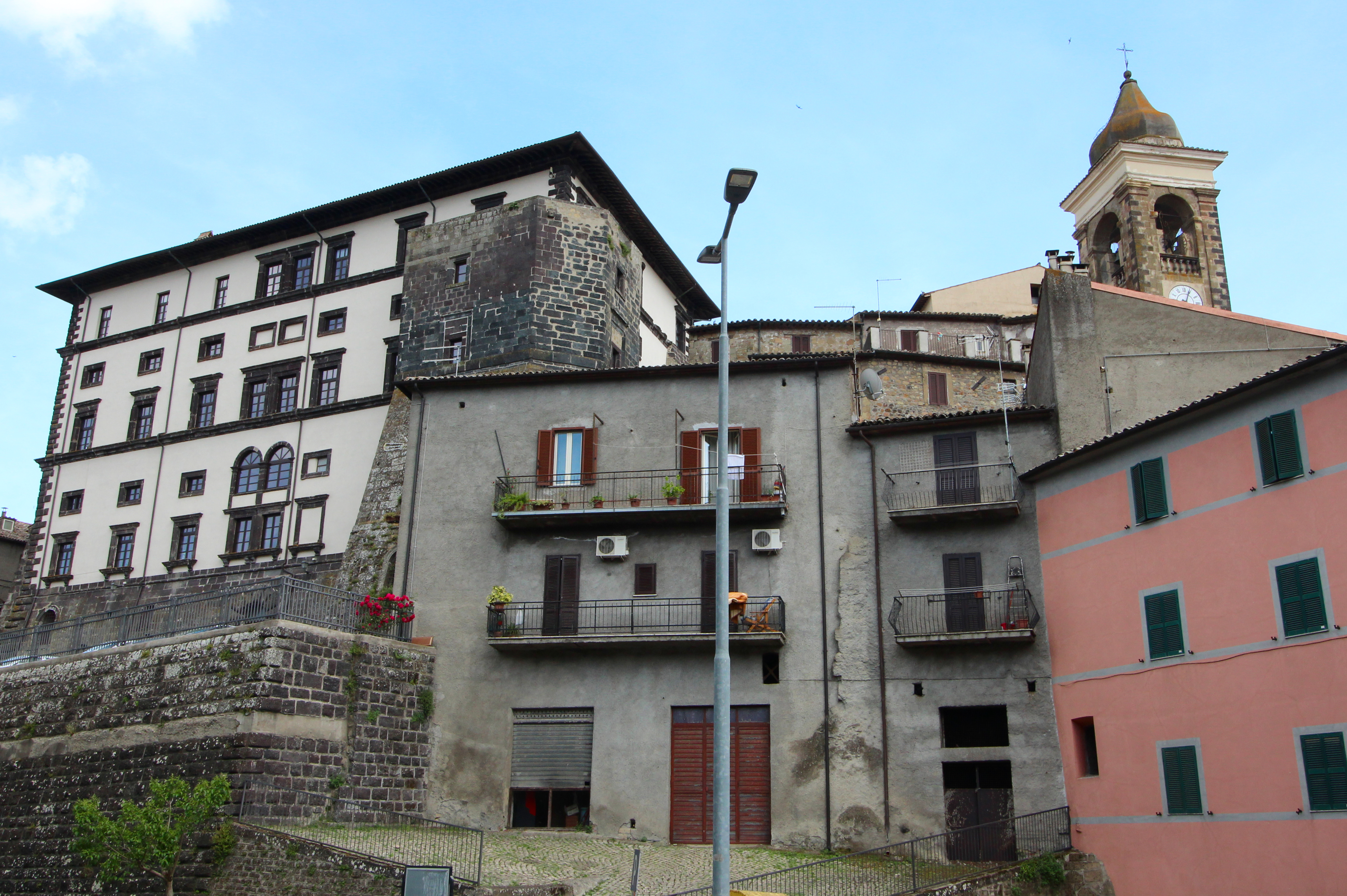

- Coat of arms

- Location within Italy Location within Lazio
- Coordinates: 42°38′N 11°51′E
- Country: Italy
- Region: Lazio
- Province: Viterbo (VT)
- Frazioni: Cantoniera

Government
  - Mayor: Carlo Benedettucci

Area
  - Total: 37.5 km^{2} (14.5 sq mi)
- Elevation: 470 m (1,540 ft)

Population (May 2010)
  - Total: 1,479
  - Density: 39.4/km^{2} (102/sq mi)
- Demonym: Gradolesi
- Time zone: UTC+1 (CET)
  - Summer (DST): UTC+2 (CEST)
- Postal code: 01010
- Dialing code: 0761
- Website: Official website

Gradoli (Central Italian: Gradele) is a comune (municipality) in the Province of Viterbo in the Italian region of Latium, located about 100 kilometres (62 mi) northwest of Rome and about 35 kilometres (22 mi) northwest of Viterbo.

Gradoli sits on a tuff hill in the Monti Volsini area, a few kilometers from the Lake Bolsena. It is home to a palace which was owned by the Farnese family; it was commissioned by Pope Paul III to (allegedly) Antonio da Sangallo the Younger on the site of the medieval castle. Of the castle, only few traces remains, including a defensive tower, the entrance arch and few parts of the walls; its ditch has been now transformed into roads and squares. Sangallo also designed the nearby church of Santa Maria Maddalena.

Gradoli borders the following Comuni: Bolsena, Capodimonte, Grotte di Castro, Latera, Montefiascone, Onano, San Lorenzo Nuovo, Valentano.

== History ==
Gradoli's origins date to the Middle Ages, when a castle was built here: this could be reached only through a series of steps (in Latin, gradus), whence its name. Matilde of Canossa donated the castle to the Papal States in the 11th century. In the following century the town became a free commune, but was soon conquered by Orvieto. Revolts followed, which were violently suppressed. In the 15th century Gradoli became a possession of the House of Farnese, who established here a summer residence under Pope Paul III. Gradoli, part of the Duchy of Castro, returned to the Papal States after the latter was crushed in the War of Castro (1649). It became part of the newly formed Kingdom of Italy in 1871.

In 1978, during the kidnapping of Aldo Moro, Gradoli was mentioned (in an alleged séance participated by future prime minister Romano Prodi) as the possible location of the politician and therefore searched. It was later discovered that the Red Brigades, the terrorist group who had captured him, had in fact a base at Rome, in via Gradoli.

== Local attractions ==
- Museum of Farnese Garments (1998)
