= Via Clodia =

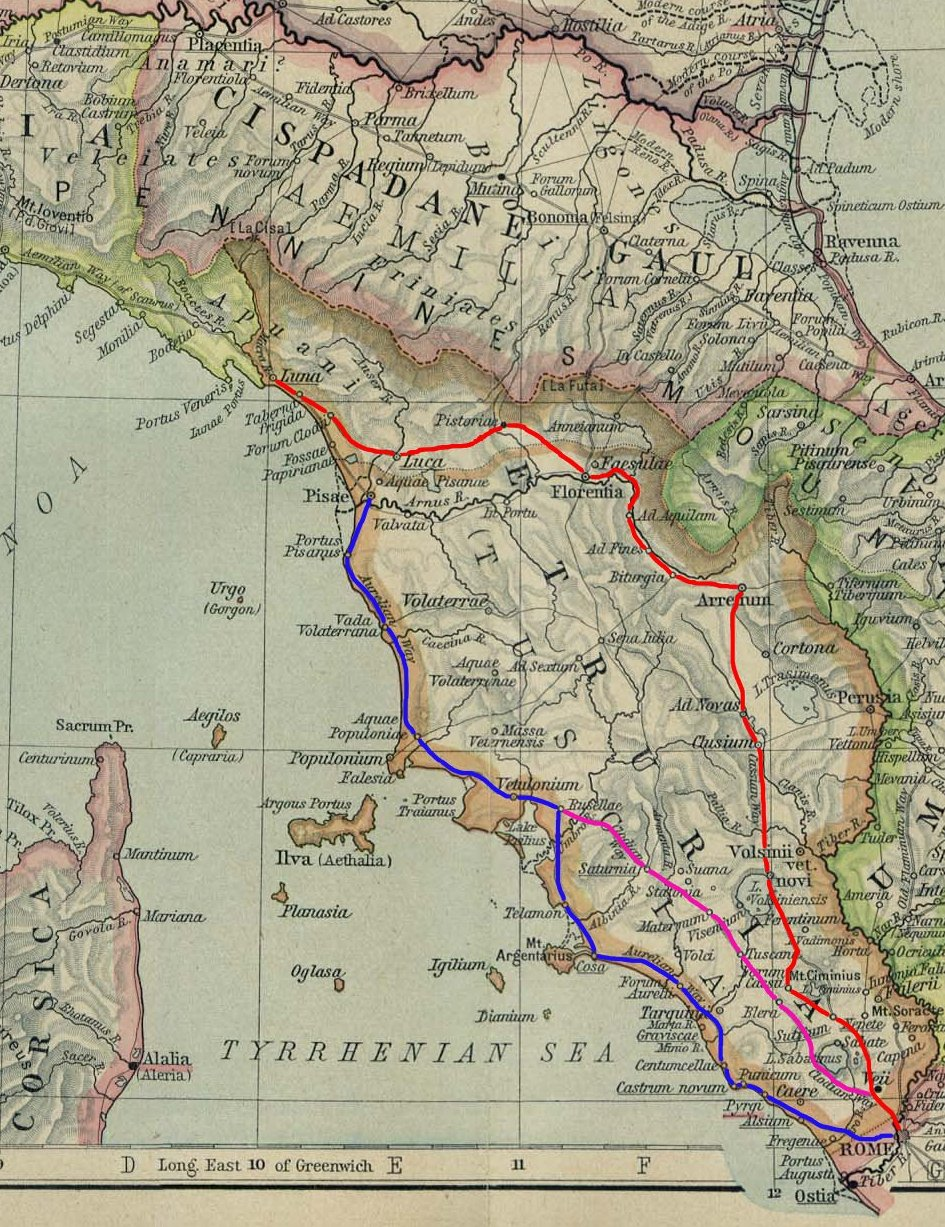
The ancient Roman roads to the northwest. In blue the original trace of the Via Aurelia, in red the Via Cassia, in mauve the Via Clodia.

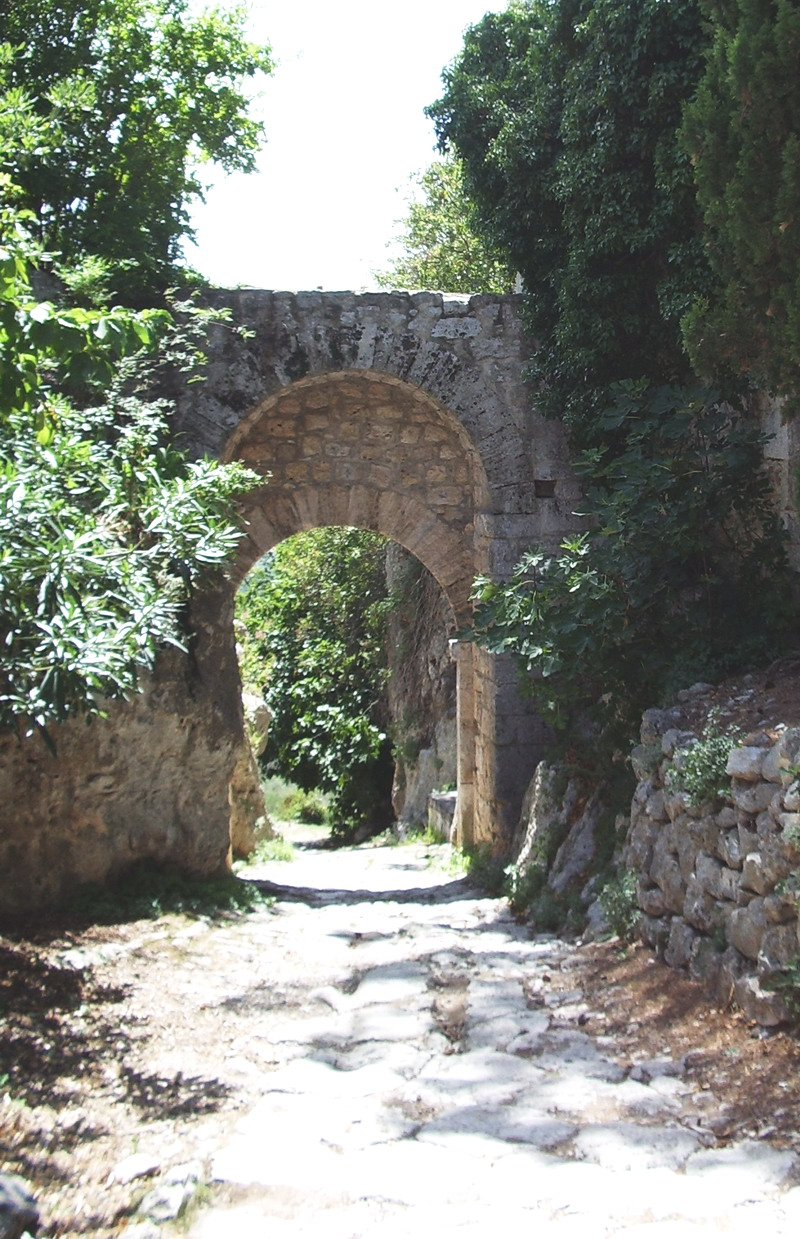
The Via Clodia at Saturnia near to Porta Romana

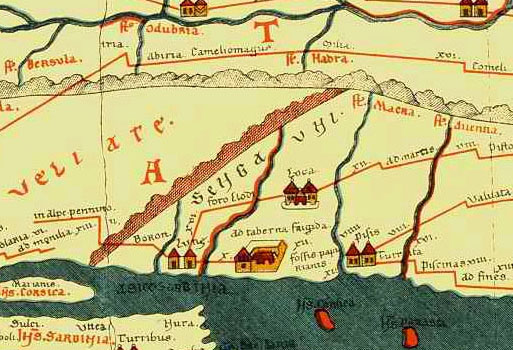
Tabula Peutingeriana: Part IV. Here the branch Pisa-Luni is not yet linked.

The Via Clodia was an ancient high road of Italy. Situated between the Via Cassia and the Via Aurelia, it is different from them notably in that the latter was designed primarily for military long-haul, irrespective of settlements they met, but the Via Clodia was of short-range, intended for commercial traffic with the colonies in Etruscan lands.

Its origin is uncertain, but most scholars agree that it was built by the Romans on an existing Etruscan route (between Pitigliano, Sorano and Sovana) on the path of the existing Etruscan "Via Cava"). However we can speak of the Via Clodia from the end of the 3rd century BC, and that from 225 BC it was paved. The existing road was probably used as a way of penetration and conquest of Etruria by the Roman army begun in 310 BC. The road never seems to have had heavy traffic, only connecting Rome with Etruria inner north-western cities. The stretch between Bracciano and Oriolo Romano continues a straight line whose paving stones are found here and there, often uprooted. Some basalt sections appear in the territory of Tuscania, Oriolo Romano, Vejano and Blera.

Its course, for the first 11 miles, was the same as that of the Via Cassia; it then diverged in a northwest direction and ran on the west side of the Lacus Sabatinus, past Forum Clodii and Blera. According to some it ended in Saturnia. At Forum Cassii it may have rejoined the Via Cassia, and it seems to have taken the same line as the latter as far as Florentia (Florence). However, beyond Florentia, between Luca (Lucca) and Luna, we find another Forum Clodii, and the Antonine itinerary gives the route from Luca to Rome as being by the Via Clodia, wrongly as regards the portion from Florentia southwards, but perhaps rightly as regards that from Luca to Florentia. Clodius Vestalis was perhaps responsible for the construction of the first portion and of that from Florentia to Luca (and Luna). Moreover, he also founded the two Fora Clodii. The name seems, in imperial times, to have to some extent driven out that of the Cassia, and both roads were administered, with other minor roads, by the same curator.

== Via Clodia Nova ==
The Via Clodia Nova extension was constructed in 183 BC by the consul Marcus Claudius Marcellus. It started from Lucca and climbed the valley on the right bank of the river Serchio, crossed the Garfagnana region to the Piazza al Serchio, then passed over the col of Tea (955m) and through Fosdinovo before joining the Via Cassia, Luni and the port.

== Stages ==
According to the Tabula Peutingeriana, the stages on the Via Clodia are:

- Sextum (in the current area of Rome called The Retort and where the Via Cassia separated)
- Careias (in the current area of Rome called Santa Maria di Galeria)
- ad Nonas (near Vigna di Valle)
- Forum Clodii (near San Liberato di Bracciano)
- Olera (Blera)
- Tuscana (Tuscania)
- Marta (on Lake Bolsena)
- Maternum (Canino or Ischia di Castro)
- Saturnia

== Roman bridges ==
There are the remains of several Roman bridges along the road, including the Ponte Piro and Ponte della Rocca.

== See also ==
- Roman road
- Roman bridge
- Roman engineering
