= Capodimonte, Lazio =

Capodimonte
- Comune
- Comune di Capodimonte
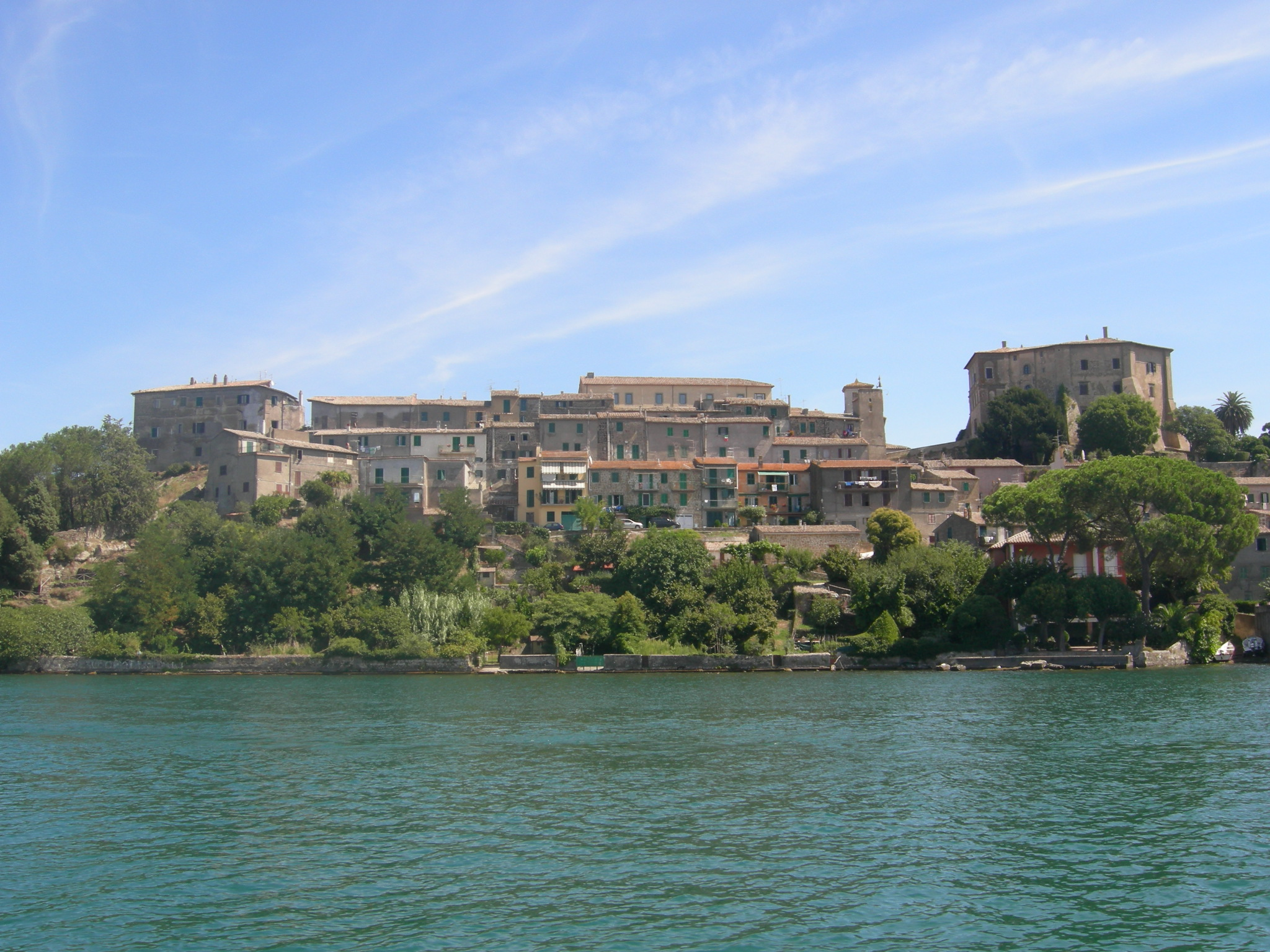

- Coat of arms

- Location within Italy Location within Lazio
- Coordinates: 42°32′N 11°54′E
- Country: Italy
- Region: Lazio
- Province: Viterbo (VT)

Government
  - Mayor: Mario Fanelli

Area
  - Total: 61.29 km^{2} (23.66 sq mi)
- Elevation: 334 m (1,096 ft)

Population (31 May 2017)
  - Total: 1,713
  - Density: 27.95/km^{2} (72.39/sq mi)
- Demonym: Capodimontani
- Time zone: UTC+1 (CET)
  - Summer (DST): UTC+2 (CEST)
- Postal code: 01010
- Dialing code: 0761
- Website: Official website

Capodimonte is a comune (municipality) in the Province of Viterbo in the Italian region Lazio, located about 90 kilometres (56 mi) northwest of Rome and about 20 kilometres (12 mi) northwest of Viterbo. It is on the southwestern shore of Lake Bolsena. In contrast to the other communities on the lake, Capodimonte has a headland with a sheltered harbor.

Capodimonte borders the following municipalities via the common border, the lake: Bolsena, Gradoli, Latera, Marta, Montefiascone, Piansano, San Lorenzo Nuovo, Tuscania, Valentano.
