= Mezzano (disambiguation) =

Mezzano is a commune in Trentino.

Mezzano may also refer to:

- Mezzano, a frazione of the commune of Caserta, Italy
- Lake Mezzano
