= Vulsini =

Region of rock

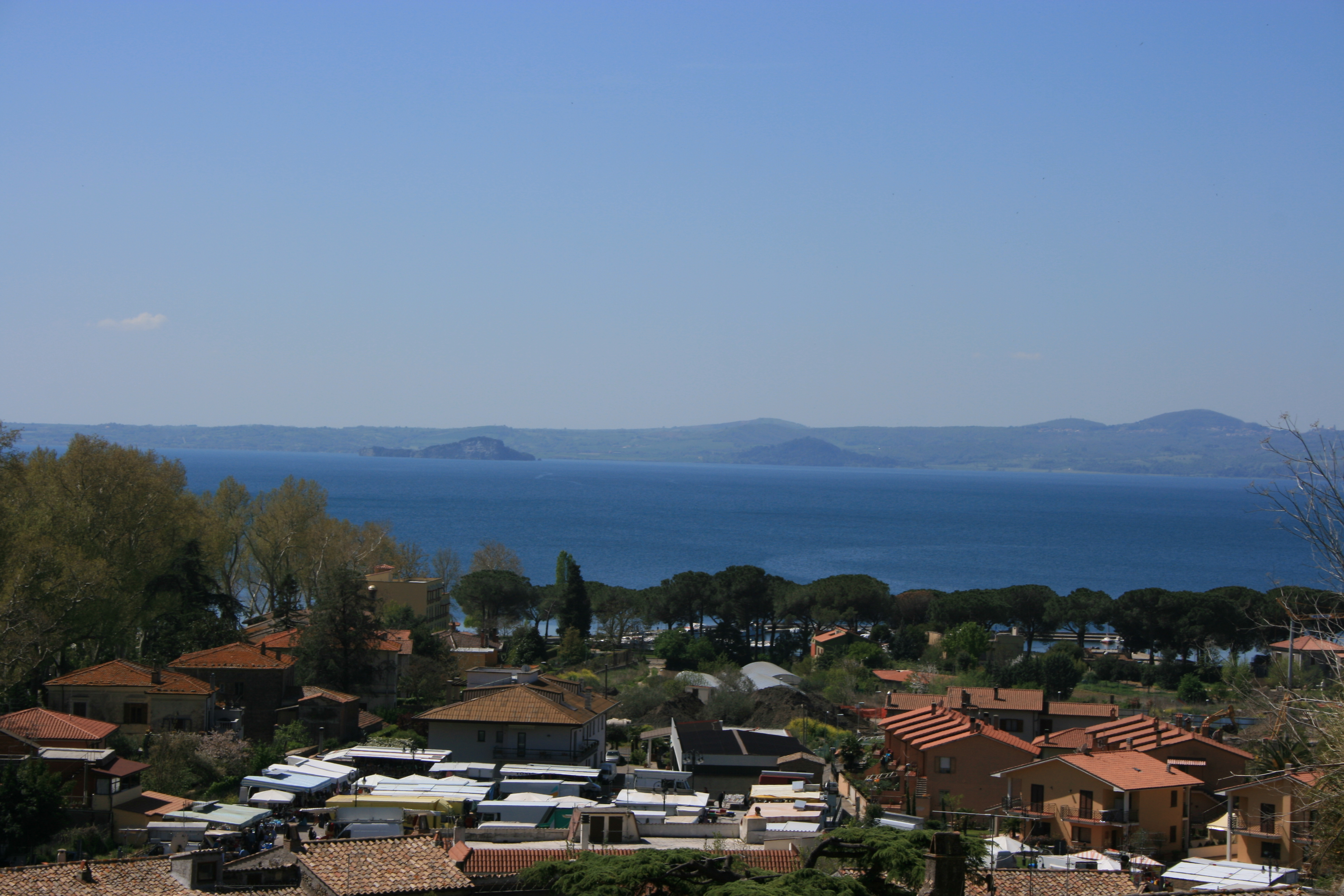
- Lake Bolsena. The two tuff islands are visible in the distance.

Highest point
- Elevation: 800 m (2,600 ft)
- Coordinates: 42°36′N 11°56′E

Geography
- Location: Lazio, Italy

Geology
- Mountain type: Caldera complex
- Volcanic arc: Campanian volcanic arc
- Last eruption: Pleistocene

Climbing
- Easiest route: walk

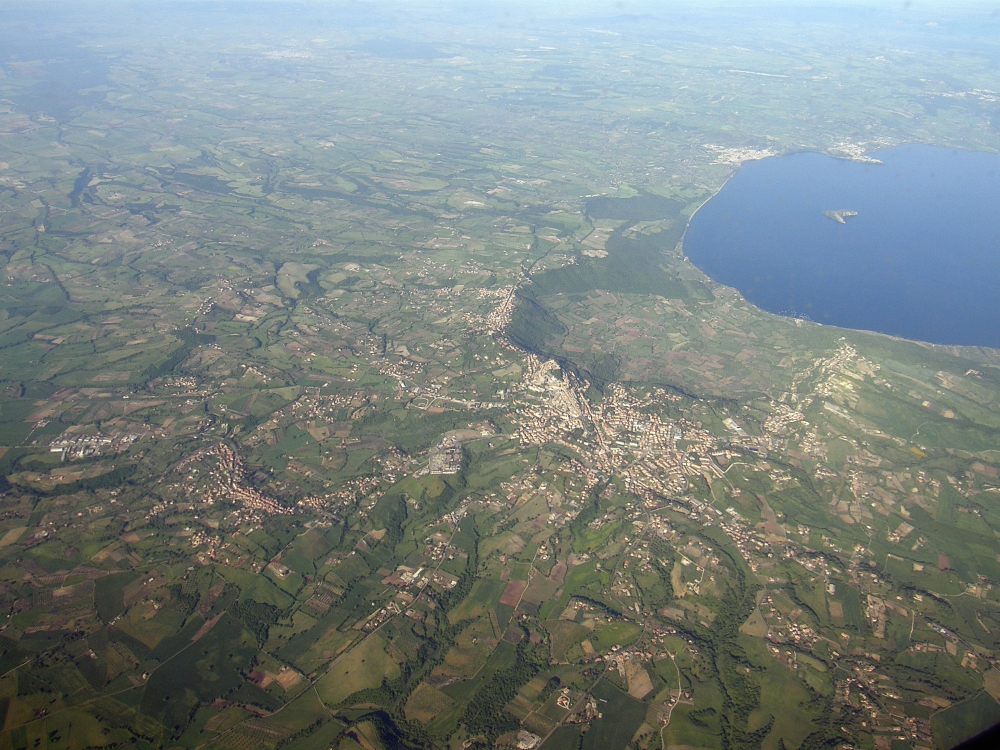
Montefiascone caldera from the air, showing the rim.

Vulsini, also known as Volsini volcano, Vulsini Volcanic District, Vulsini Volcanic Complex and the Vulsinian District, is a circular region of intrusive igneous rock in Lazio, Italy, about 87 km (54 mi) to the north northwest of Rome, containing a cluster of calderas known to have been active in recent geologic times. The Vulsinian region is one of dozens of intrusive circular regions, most smaller than the Vulsinian, arranged in a band from Campania through Lazio, called the Roman Comagmatic Province. A comagmatic province is a geologic area of the same type and age igneous rock deriving from the same crustal magma. The Roman region is post-collisional; that is, the intrusions were not a result of the lateral stresses that created Italy and raised the Apennines, but were subsequent to Italy's creation. The Volsinian is the northernmost region.

At relatively low altitude, the Vulsini calderas cover about 2,280 km^{2} (880 mi^{2}) and contain four Pleistocene-age depressions known as Bolsena, Latera, Vepe and Montefiascone calderas. An alleged eruption occurred in 104 BC, but it is currently considered a misinterpretation of the description of a fire, and the most recent confirmed activity occurred in Pleistocene. The largest, the Bolsena caldera, which is roughly 16 km (9.9 mi) across, is filled with the waters of Lake Bolsena, which derive mainly from deep aquifers. Immediately to the northwest are the combined Latera and Vepe calderas, about 8 km (5.0 mi) by 11 km (6.8 mi). Vepe, to the north of Lake Mezzano (a very small crater lake west of Lake Bolsena) is what is known as a nested caldera; it arose in the previously existing Latera Caldera. Italian routes SS74 and SS312 follow the rim from Valentano through Latera westward, turning off before Mezzano on the other side. In addition the small Montefiascone caldera, also nested, lies between Montefiascone on its eastern rim and the lake. Two islands in the lake, Bisentina and Martana, were formed from airfall tuffs in Pompeii-like eruptions. Dozens of other tuff cones dot the region, mainly on the eastern side of the complex.

The Italian Civil Protection Department considers Vulsini as extinct.

== Subfeatures ==
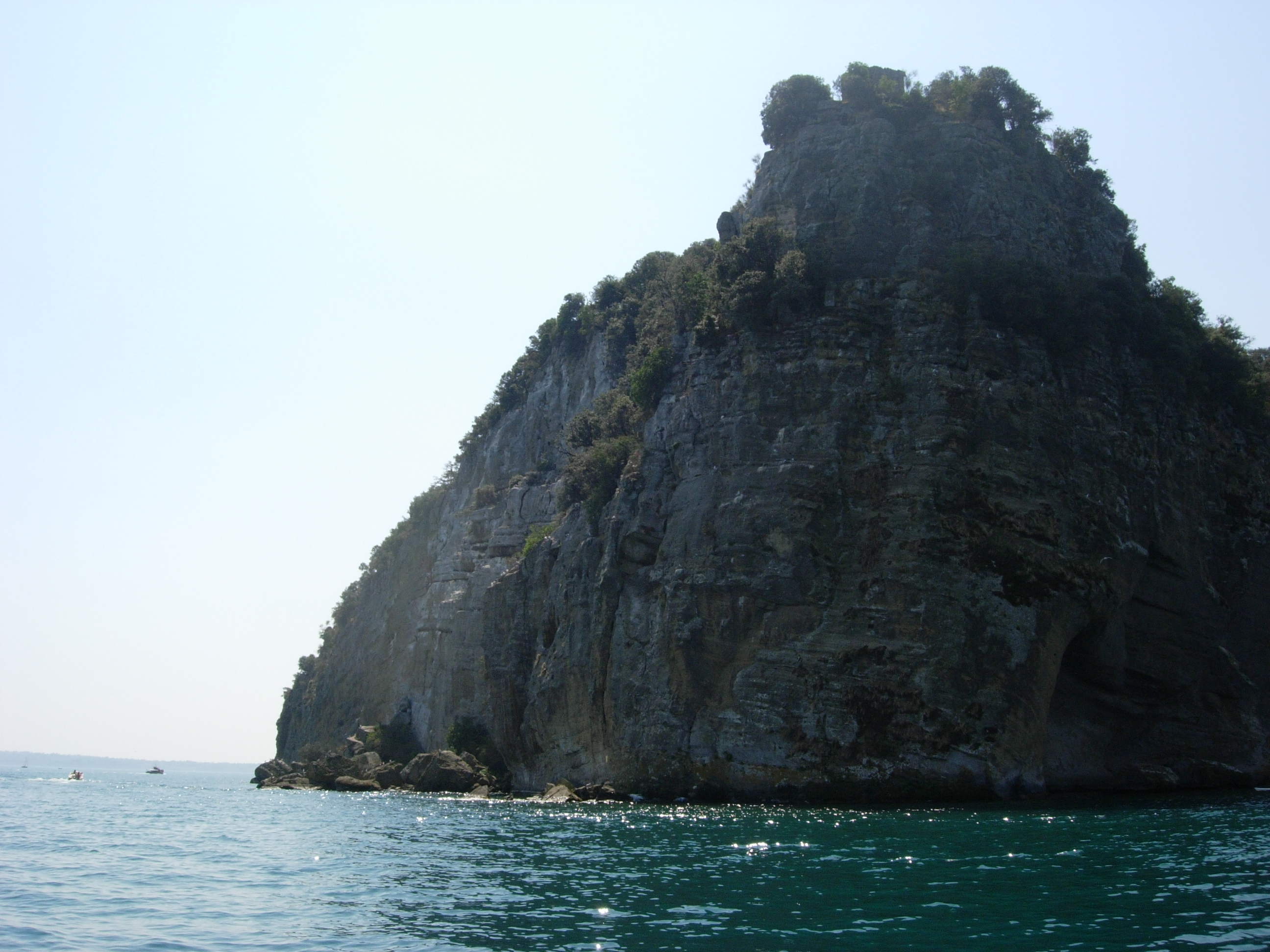
Isola Bisentina, a tuff cone in Lake Bolsena.

The following tuff cones stand out in the region:

- Monte Becco
- Isola Bisentina
- La Dogana
- Monte Evangelista, 633 m (2,077 ft)
- Isola Martana
- Molino
- Montefiascone
- Monte Montione
- Valentano
- Monte Pilato
- Monte Rosso
- Santa Luce
- Santa Maria di Sala
- Selva del Lamone
- Monte Semonte
- Monte Spinaio
- Monte Bandinio

== See also ==
- Monti Volsini
