= Volsinii =

Ancient Etruscan cities

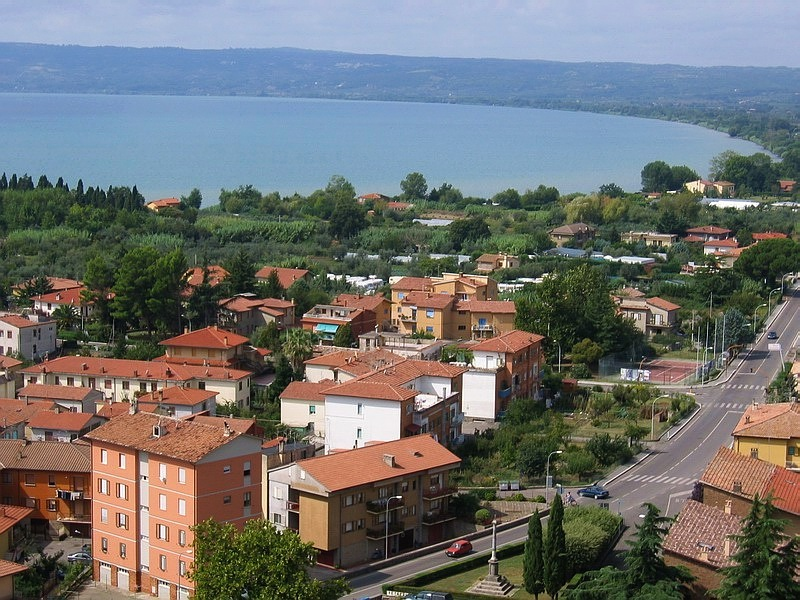
Bolsena at the site of Roman Volsinii. 42°38′41″N 11°59′09″E

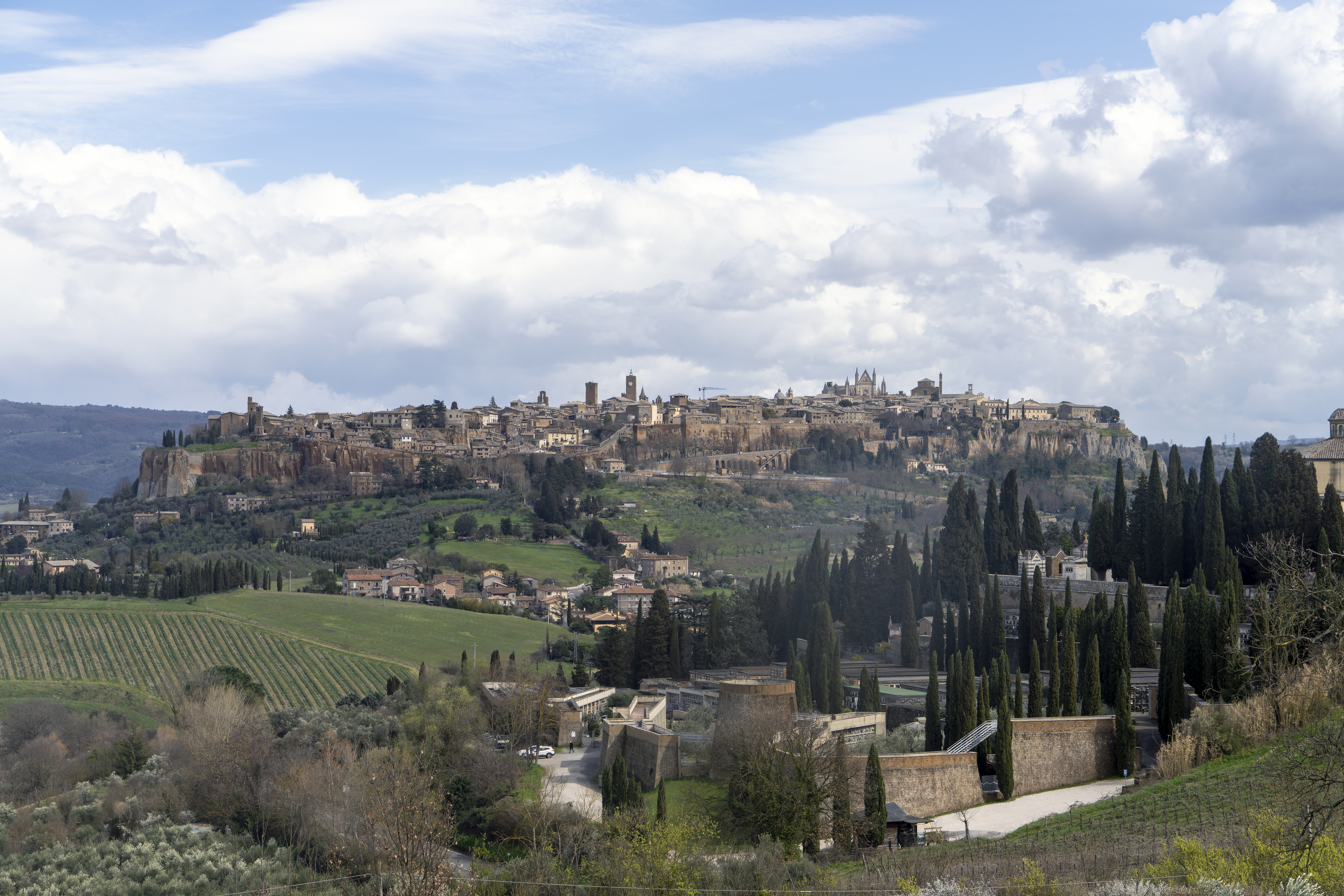
Orvieto, candidate for the location of Etruscan Velzna. Etruscan antiquities there are extensive. 42°43′N 12°06′E

Volsinii or Vulsinii (Etruscan: Velzna or Velusna; Greek: Ouolsinioi, Ὀυολσίνιοι; Ὀυολσίνιον), is the name of two ancient cities of Etruria, one situated on the shore of Lacus Volsiniensis (modern Lago di Bolsena), and the other on the Via Clodia, between Clusium (Chiusi) and Forum Cassii (Vetralla). The latter was Etruscan and was destroyed by the Romans in 264 BC following an attempted revolt by its slaves, while the former was founded by the Romans using the remainder of the Etruscan population rescued from the razed city.

Modern Bolsena, Italy, in the region of Lazio, descends from the Roman city. The location of the Etruscan city is debated. Umbrian Orvieto, about 14 km (8.7 mi) from Bolsena, is a strong candidate.

== Location ==
The Byzantine historian Joannes Zonaras states that the Etruscan Volsinii lay on a steep height; while Bolsena, the modern town on the site of Roman Volsinii, is situated in the plain. Scholars of the 19th century debated the location of this elevated site. Wilhelm Ludwig Abeken looked for it at Montefiascone, 14 km (8.7 mi) from Bolsena at the southern extremity of the lake; while Karl Otfried Müller believed it was at Orvieto, 17 km (11 mi) away, and adduced the name of that place in Latin, Urbs Vetus, the "old city," as an argument in favour of his view. British explorer and writer George Dennis was of the opinion that there was no reason to believe that it was so far from the Roman city, and that it lay on the summit of the hill, above the amphitheater at Bolsena, at a spot called Il Piazzano. He adduced in support of this hypothesis the existence of a good deal of broken pottery there, and of a few caves in the cliffs below.

=== Fanum Voltumnae ===
Fanum Voltumnae was the chief sanctuary of the Etruscans. Numerous sources refer to a league of the "Twelve Peoples" of Etruria, which met annually at the Fanum, possibly for the purpose of electing priests. The exact location of this shrine is still unknown, though it may have been in an area near modern Orvieto, believed by many to be the ancient Volsinii. Professor Simonetta Stopponi of the University of Macerata, an Etruscologist, has been excavating at Orvieto since 2000. She believes that Fanum was located at this site.

An Etruscan substructure, datable to the 6th-4th centuries BC, has been uncovered.

"Most impressive was the excavation of a round fountain area, on a slight rise above and overlooking the temples, whose decorations included the head of a lion. According to Stopponi, ‘This would have been the sacred spring.’"

== History ==
=== Volsinii veteres ===
Etruscan Volsinii (Velzna or Velusna; or sometimes in Latin Volsinii Veteres – Old Volsinii) appears to have been one of the most powerful cities of Etruria, the cult centre of the god Voltumna, and was doubtless one of the 12 which formed the Etruscan confederation, as Volsinii is designated by Livy and Valerius Maximus as one of the capita Etruriae ("heads of Etruria"). It is described by Juvenal as seated among well-wooded hills.

Volsinii first enters Roman historiography following the fall of Veii in 396 BC. The Volsinienses, in conjunction with the Salpinates, taking advantage of a famine and pestilence which had desolated Rome, made incursions into the Roman territory in 391 BC. They were defeated, and 8,000 of them were taken prisoner. However, they purchased a twenty-year truce in exchange for returning the booty they had taken, and furnishing the pay of the Roman army for a year.

They appear next in 310 BC, when, in common with the rest of the Etruscan cities, except Arretium (modern Arezzo), they took part in the siege of Sutrium (modern Sutri), a city in alliance with Rome. This war was terminated by the defeat of the Etruscans at the First Battle of Lake Vadimo (310 BC), a major blow to their power. Three years afterwards the consul Publius Decius Mus captured several of the Volsinian fortresses. In 295 BC, Lucius Postumius Megellus ravaged their territory and defeated them under the walls of their own city, slaying 2,800 of them. Consequently they, together with Perusia (modern Perugia) and Arretium, purchased a forty-year peace by paying a heavy fine.

Not more than fourteen years, however, had elapsed, when, with their allies the Vulcientes, they again took up arms against Rome. But this attempt ended in their final subjugation in 280 BC. Pliny tells an absurd story, taken from the Greek writer Metrodorus of Scepsis, that the object of the Romans in capturing Volsinii was to make themselves masters of 2,000 statues which it contained. The story, however, suffices to show that the Volsinians had attained great wealth, luxury, and art. This is confirmed by Valerius Maximus, who also adds that this luxury was the cause of their ruin, by making them so indolent that they at length allowed the administration of their commonwealth to be usurped by slaves.

The attempted revolution apparently began with the admission of freedmen into the army, which must have been in 280 BC. They became a powerful plebeian class, who were subsequently allowed to become members of the Senate and to hold public office. They seem to have acquired majorities, using them to shape the law. Other slaves were set free; they gave themselves all the privileges formerly reserved for the Etruscans, such as rights of intermarriage and inheritance, and aggressively insisted on them against the will of the Etruscan patrician class. There were complaints of rape and robbery.

In 265 BC, when the revolutionary party began to pass laws limiting patrician political activity, the lucumones sent a clandestine embassy to Rome asking for military assistance. On their return they were executed for treason, but shortly afterwards a Roman army arrived to lay siege to the town. The subsequent conflict was intense; the consul and commanding general, Quintus Fabius Gurges, was a casualty. A year later his successor, Marcus Fulvius Flaccus, receiving the surrender of the town through its starvation, razed it and executed the leaders of the plebeian party. The first display of gladiators at Rome in 264 is believed to have featured now captive freedmen from Volsinii. The Romans rescued and restored to power the remaining Etruscans of Volsinii, but decided it was necessary to remove them from that location to a new city on the shores of Lake Bolsena. The new city had none of the natural defenses of the old one and was not in any way sovereign. The portable wealth from the old city was carried off to Rome.

=== Volsinii novi ===
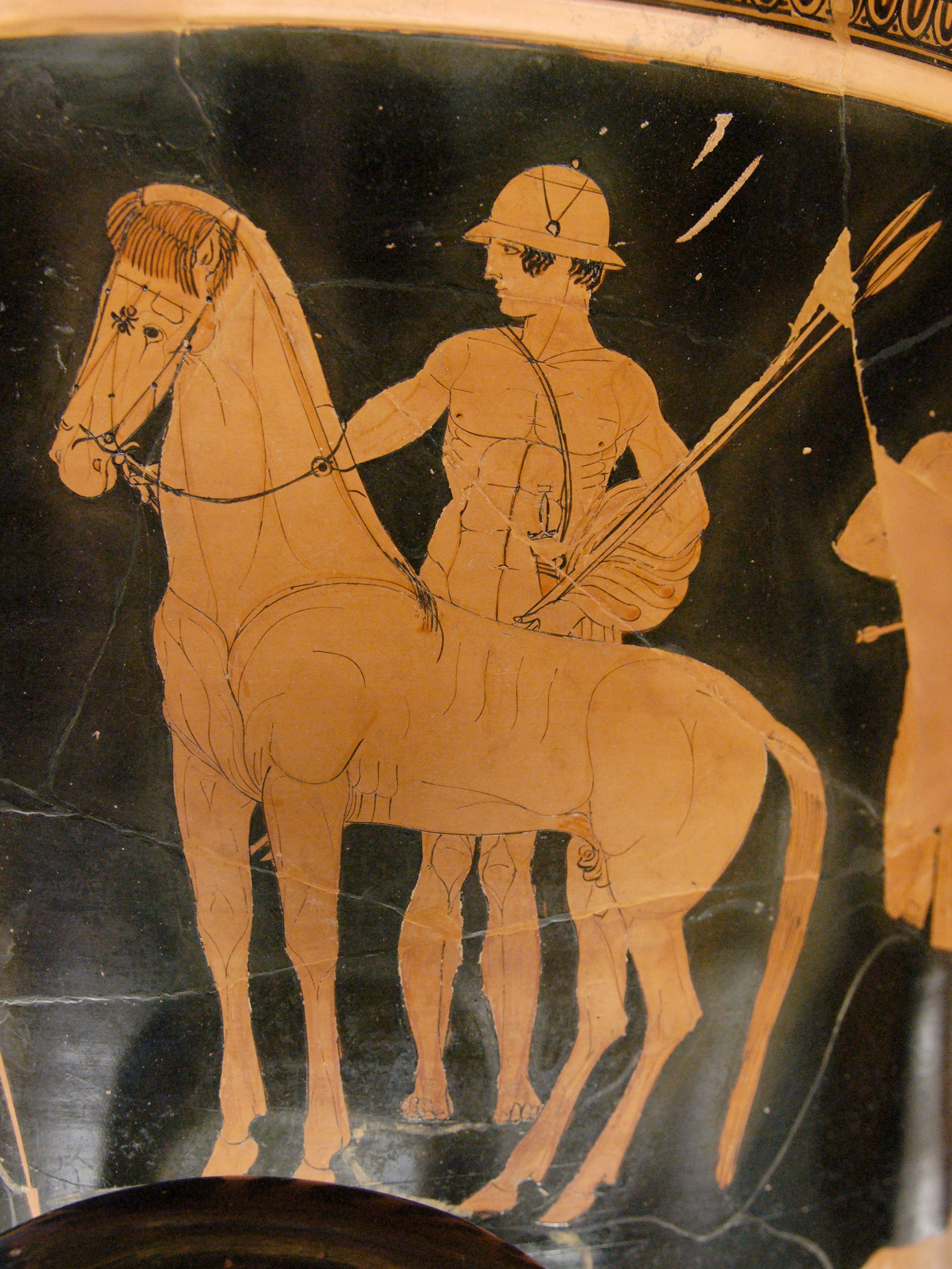
Attic red-figure calyx-krater, c. 460–450 BC, from Orvieto (the Niobid Krater).

This second, or Roman, Volsinii (sometimes called Volsinii Novi – New Volsinii) continued to exist under the Empire. It was the birthplace of Sejanus, the minister and favorite of Tiberius. Juvenal (x. 74) alludes to this circumstance when he considers the fortunes of Sejanus as dependent on the favor of Nursia, or Norsia, an Etruscan goddess much worshipped at Volsinii, into whose temple there, as in that of Jupiter Capitolinus at Rome, a nail was annually driven to mark the years. According to Pliny, Volsinii was the scene of some supernatural occurrences. He records that lightning was drawn down from heaven by king Porsenna to destroy a monster called Volta that was ravaging its territory. Even the commonplace invention of hand-mills, ascribed to this city, is embellished with the traditional prodigy that some of them turned by themselves.

== Remains ==
No definite traces of the Etruscan Volsinii have been identified. Of the Roman city, some remains are still extant at Bolsena. The most remarkable are those of a temple near the Florence gate, commonly called the Tempio di Norsia. But the remains are of Roman work; and the real temple of that goddess most probably stood in the Etruscan city. The amphitheater is small and a complete ruin. Besides these there are the remains of some baths, sepulchral tablets, and a sarcophagus with reliefs representing the triumph of Bacchus. The Monti Volsini mountain range in northern Lazio takes its name from the ancient city.

== Coinage ==
Volsinii minted coins in antiquity. A full discussion of the coins of Volsinii may be found in Müller, Etrusker, vol. i. pp. 324, 333.

== Native Volsinians ==
- Sejanus, praetorian prefect under Tiberius.
- Musonius Rufus the Stoic.
- Aulus Cornelius Palma Frontonianus, Roman statesman.

== See also ==
- Lake Bolsena
- Vulsini
