= Bolsena (disambiguation) =

Bolsena can refer to the following items:

- Bolsena, a town of Lazio
- Lake Bolsena, the lake on which Bolsena is situated
- Bolsena Lacus, a Hydrocarbon lake on Titan
- Corporal of Bolsena, a relic of the Roman Catholic Church
- Andrea Adami da Bolsena, an Italian musician
- The Mass at Bolsena, a painting

== See also ==
- Volsinii (disambiguation)
