= Forum Clodii =

Post station in Italy

Coordinates: 42°07′20″N 12°10′29″E

Forum Clodii, is a post station on the Via Clodia, about 23 miles (37 km) northwest of Rome (not 32 miles as in the Antonine Itinerary), situated above the western bank of the Lacus Sabatinus (now known as Lake Bracciano), and connected with the Via Cassia at Vacanae by a branch road which ran round the north side of the lake.

The site is marked by the church of Saints Marcus, Marcianus and Liberatus, which was founded in the 8th or 9th century AD. Inscriptions mentioning the Foro Clodienses have come to light on the spot; and an inscription of the Augustan period, which probably stood over the door of a villa, calls the place Pausilypon – a name justified by the beauty of the site.

== Ecclesiastical history ==
In about AD 300 a bishopric was established here as Diocese of Forum Clodii

In about AD 600 it was renamed in (Curiate) Italian as Diocese of Monterano (viz.; apparently after its nearby 'new' see) Monterano (in modern municipality Canale Monterano, in the Metropolitan City of Rome), however still known as Forum Clodii, or Manturanum (Curiate Middle Latin), which was suppressed around AD 900.

After its nominal restoration in 1966, the Latin titular bishopric again has the double name of Forum Claudii in Latin and Monterano in Curiate Italian.
