= Marta, Lazio =

Marta
- Comune
- Comune di Marta
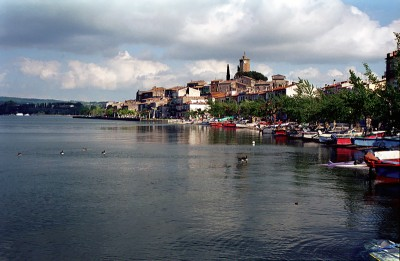

- Location within Italy Location within Lazio
- Coordinates: 42°32′N 11°55′E
- Country: Italy
- Region: Lazio
- Province: Viterbo (VT)

Government
  - Mayor: Maurizio Lacchini

Area
  - Total: 33.54 km^{2} (12.95 sq mi)
- Elevation: 315 m (1,033 ft)

Population (30 September 2017)
  - Total: 3,247
  - Density: 96.81/km^{2} (250.7/sq mi)
- Demonym: Martani
- Time zone: UTC+1 (CET)
  - Summer (DST): UTC+2 (CEST)
- Postal code: 01010
- Dialing code: 0761
- Website: Official website

Marta is a comune (municipality) in the Province of Viterbo in the Italian region of Latium, located about 80 kilometres (50 mi) northwest of Rome and about 20 kilometres (12 mi) northwest of Viterbo.

Marta borders the following municipalities: Capodimonte, Montefiascone, Tuscania, Viterbo.

Marta is on the southern shore of Lake Bolsena near the source of the Marta River.
