= Blera =

- Comune
- Comune di Blera
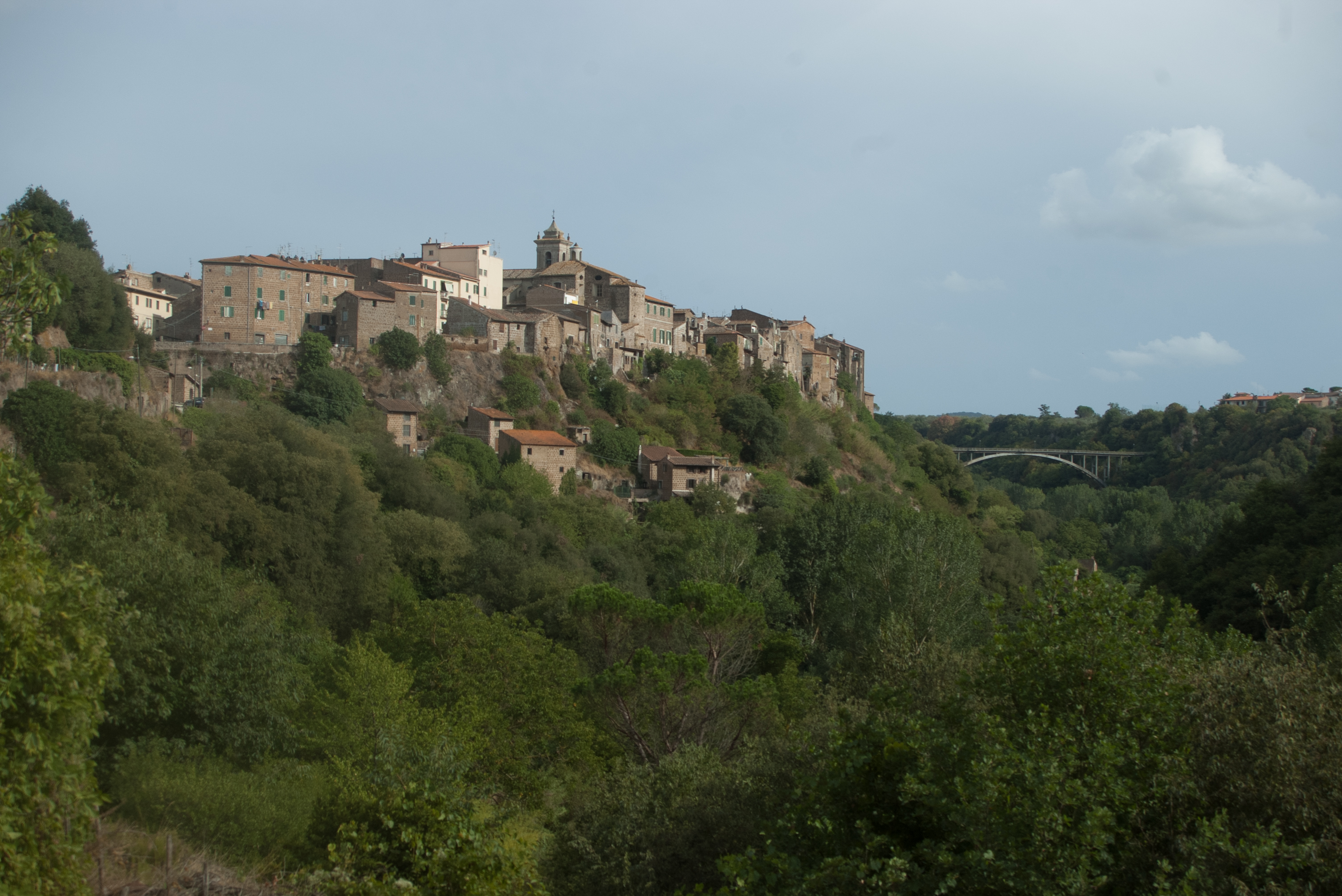
- Blera and the Fascist built bridge.

- Coat of arms

- Location within Italy Location within Lazio
- Coordinates: 42°16′24″N 12°01′57″E
- Country: Italy
- Region: Lazio
- Province: Viterbo (VT)
- Frazioni: Civitella Cesi

Government
  - Mayor: Nicola Mazzarella

Area
  - Total: 92.92 km^{2} (35.88 sq mi)
- Elevation: 270 m (890 ft)

Population (30 April 2017)
  - Total: 3,316
  - Density: 35.69/km^{2} (92.43/sq mi)
- Demonym: Blerani
- Time zone: UTC+1 (CET)
  - Summer (DST): UTC+2 (CEST)
- Postal code: 01010
- Dialing code: 0761
- Patron saint: St. Viventius
- Saint day: December 11
- Website: Official website

Blera is a small town and comune in the northern Lazio region of Italy. It was known during the Middle Ages as Bieda, an evolved form of its ancient name, which was restored in the twentieth century. It is the birthplace of Pope Sabinian; Pope Paschal II was also originally thought to be from here.

It is situated on a long, narrow tongue of rock at the junction of two deep glens.

== History ==
In ancient times, Blera was an Etruscan town on the Via Clodia. It was of little importance, and is known to be mentioned only by geographers and in inscriptions.

In 772, it was destroyed by the Lombards of King Desiderius. In the thirteenth-fifteenth centuries, it belonged to the Di Vico family. In 1247 the army of Frederick II ravaged it. In the fifteenth century, Pope Boniface IX gave Blera to the Anguillara family, who owned it until 1572, apart from a short period from 1465 under direct Papal control. Later it followed the history of the Papal States.

== Main sights ==
Some remains of the town walls still exist, and also two ancient bridges, both belonging to the Via Clodia, and many tombs hewn in the rock with small chambers imitating the architectural forms of houses, and beams and rafters represented in relief.

=== Selvasecca di Blera ===
Eric Berggren and the Swedish Institute in Rome excavated a Republican period rural structure or villa at the site of Selvasecca di Blera between 1965 and 1967, with preliminary results published in 1969. The hill of Selvasecca lies about 6 km southwest of Blera itself. The villa site is marked by a courtyard building that includes a remarkable vaulted cistern built using opus caementicium. There is also evidence that architectural terracottas were produced at the site. The implications of the villa itself have been recently re-visited.
