= Forum Cassii =

Forum Cassii was an ancient town of Etruria, in central Italy, situated on the Via Cassia, with the formation of which, from its name, it was certainly connected. It is known to us from the Itineraries, which place it 11 Roman miles beyond Sutrium (modern Sutri), between that place and Volsinii, and 44 miles from Rome

The distinct traces of the Via Cassia enable us to place it with certainty about 2 km northeast of Vetralla (in the modern-day Province of Viterbo, Lazio) where an ancient church still retains the name of Santa Maria in Forcassi, and some portions of Roman buildings are still extant. The inhabitants migrated during the Middle Ages to the neighbouring village of Vetralla
