= Vasanello =

- Comune
- Comune di Vasanello
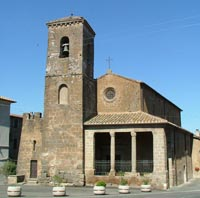
- Church of Santa Maria Assunta

- Location within Italy Location within Lazio
- Coordinates: 42°24′52″N 12°20′51″E
- Country: Italy
- Region: Lazio
- Province: Viterbo (VT)

Government
  - Mayor: Antonio Porri

Area
  - Total: 28.96 km^{2} (11.18 sq mi)
- Elevation: 265 m (869 ft)

Population (31 December 2010)
  - Total: 4,249
  - Density: 146.7/km^{2} (380.0/sq mi)
- Demonym: Vasanellesi
- Time zone: UTC+1 (CET)
  - Summer (DST): UTC+2 (CEST)
- Postal code: 01030
- Dialing code: 0761
- Patron saint: St. Lannus
- Saint day: 5 May
- Website: Official website

Vasanello is a comune (municipality) in the Province of Viterbo in the Italian region Lazio, located about 80 kilometres (50 mi) north of GRA (Rome) and about 27 kilometres (17 mi) east of Viterbo.

== Main sights ==
- Orsini castle (12th century). It is a tuff construction with four cylindrical towers
- Santa Maria Assunta - 11th-century church built over a former Roman temple.
- San Salvatore - 11th century church also in tuff. It has a 13th-century bell tower with mullioned windows and Ancient Roman spolia.

== Twin towns ==
- Åsnes, Norway
- Dschang, Cameroon
