= Santa Maria Assunta, Vasanello =

Building in Vasanello, Italy

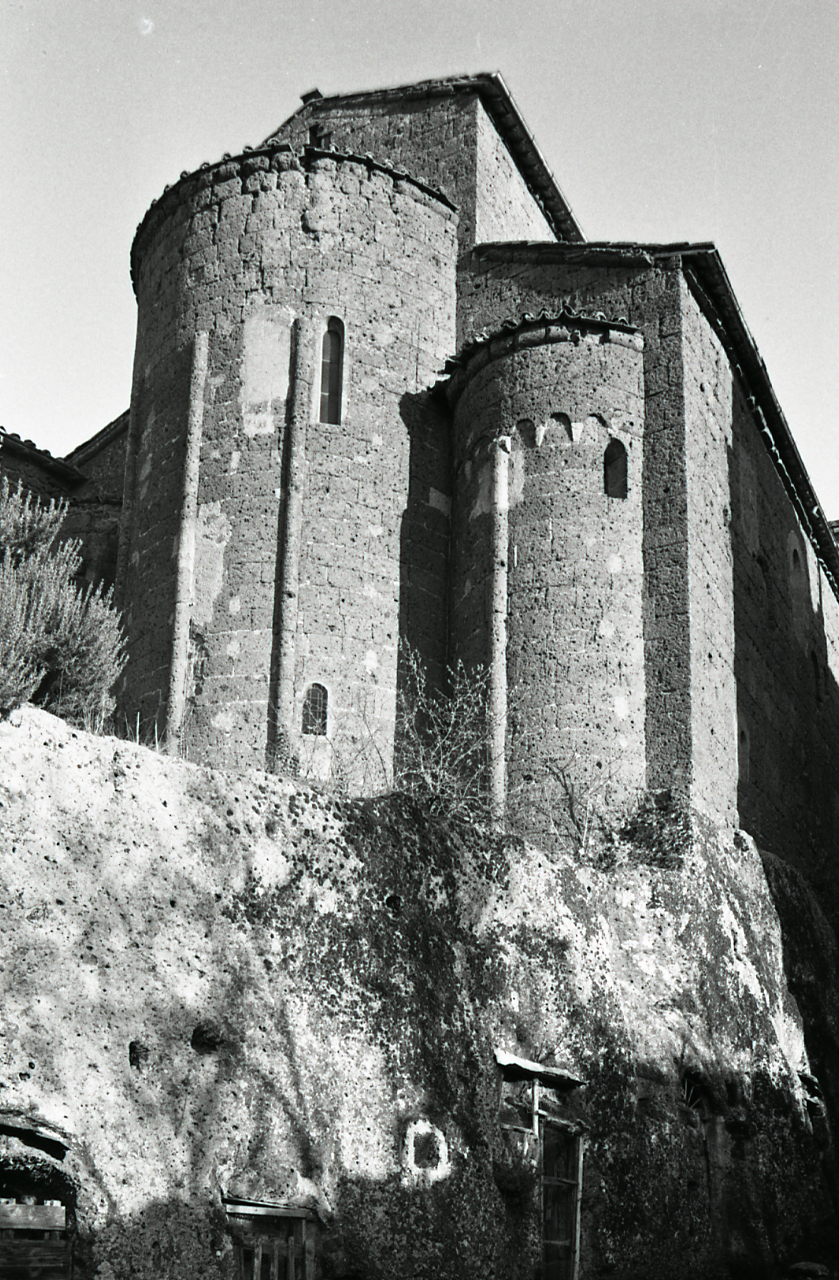

Santa Maria Assunta is a Romanesque-style Roman Catholic parish church in Vasanello in the region of Lazio, Italy.

== History ==
Sited near the via Amerina, the church likely ministered to pilgrims on the road to and from Rome. The church was likely erected in the 11th century. Over the years, the walls and what is now the bell-tower became part of the defensive wall of the town. The town walls were mostly torn down in 1885.

The interior has undergone many refurbishments. The church has three naves, divided by columns with Romanesque capitals in peperino stone. The church ends in three semicircular apses. These have frescoes of the 12th century. The crypt houses the putative relics of San Lanno (perhaps derived from Lando or Rolando), stated by later hagiographies to have been martyred during the persecutions of emperor Diocletian. The church once sheltered the gilded silver bust of San Lanno (1754). This reliquary bust was donated to the church by Don Giulio Cesare Colonna-Barberini, Duke of Vasanello and Prince of Palestrina. It was made by the jeweler Vincenzo Belli. It is still displayed in festive religious processions. This church is distinct from the small Chapel of San Lanno, located about 250 west of the church, which has frescoes by Piermatteo d'Amelia.
