= Marta (river) =

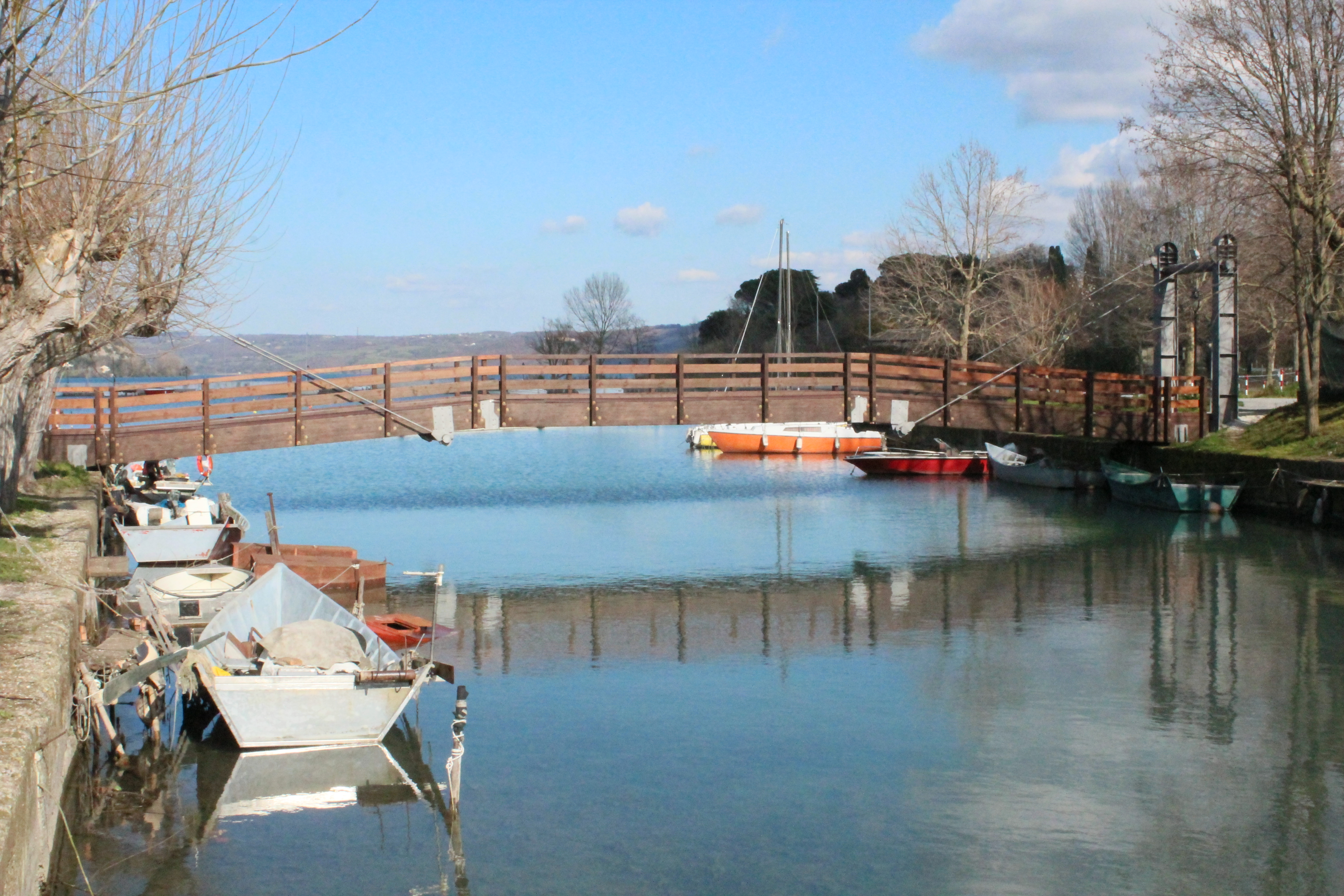

Location
- Country: Italy

Physical characteristics
- Mouth: Tyrrhenian Sea
  - coordinates: 42.2352°N 11.6958°E

The Marta is an Italian river that flows into the Tyrrhenian Sea. Its source is Lake Bolsena near Marta. It flows past Tuscania and is joined by a tributary that flows from the Cimini Hills. It then flows past Tarquinia and enters the Tyrrhenian Sea near Lido di Tarquinia.
