= Monti Volsini =

Mountain range in Italy

Coordinates: 42°40′N 11°55′E

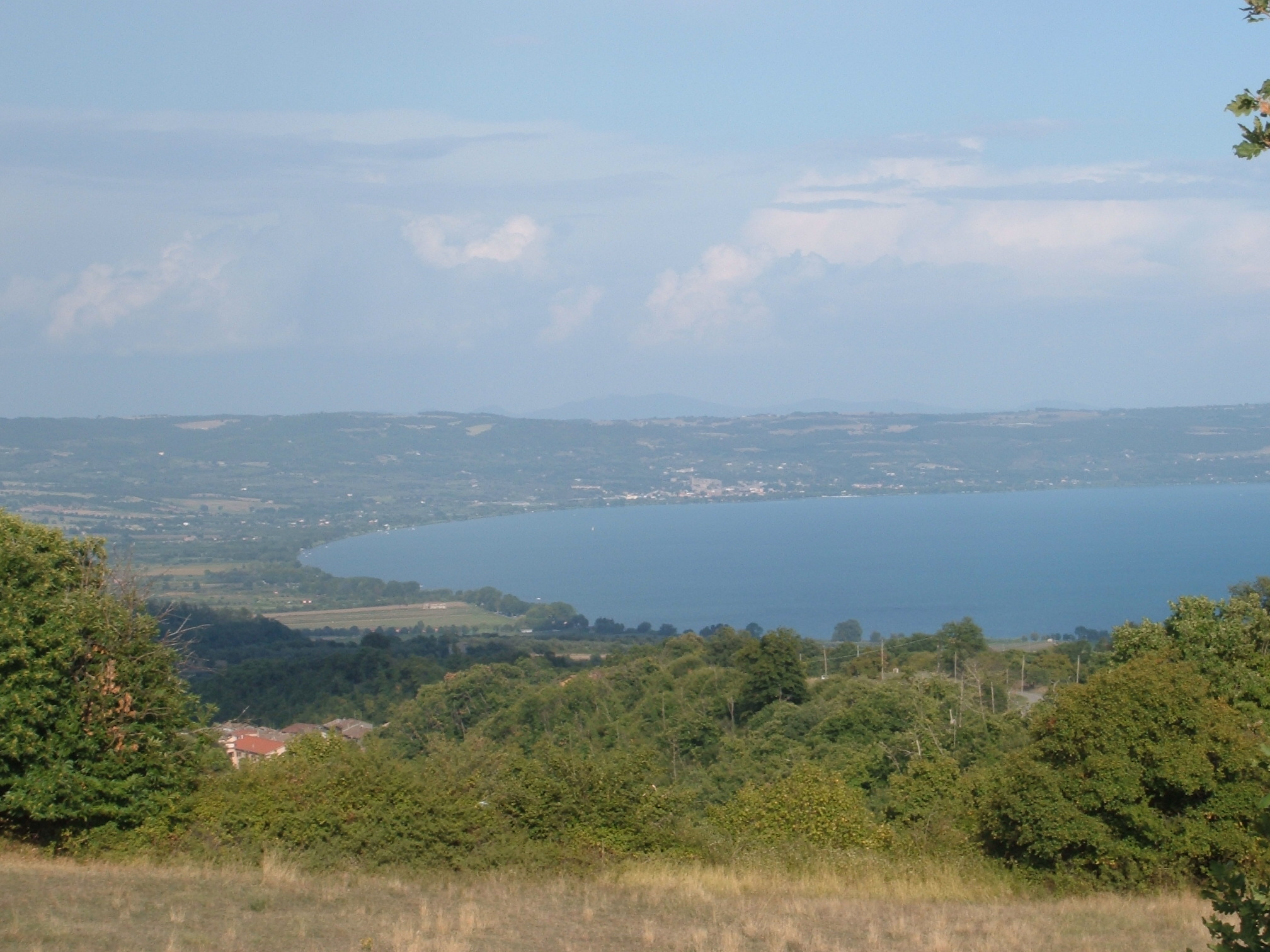
The lake seen from the Mountains Vulsini at Gradoli.

The Monti Volsini or Vulsini are a minor mountain range in northern Lazio, Italy, near the Lake Bolsena. The highest point is that of Passo della Montagnola, in the comune of Latera, at c. 645 m.

== Background ==
The area is the relic of an ancient volcano (Vulsinio). In the area grape and olives are intensively cultivated, while vegetation include Oak, Alder and Sweet Chestnut. Boar is also present in the Volsini region.

The range takes its name from the ancient Etruscan city of Vulsinii.
