= Grotte di Castro =

Municipality in Lazio, Italy

- Comune
- Comune di Grotte di Castro
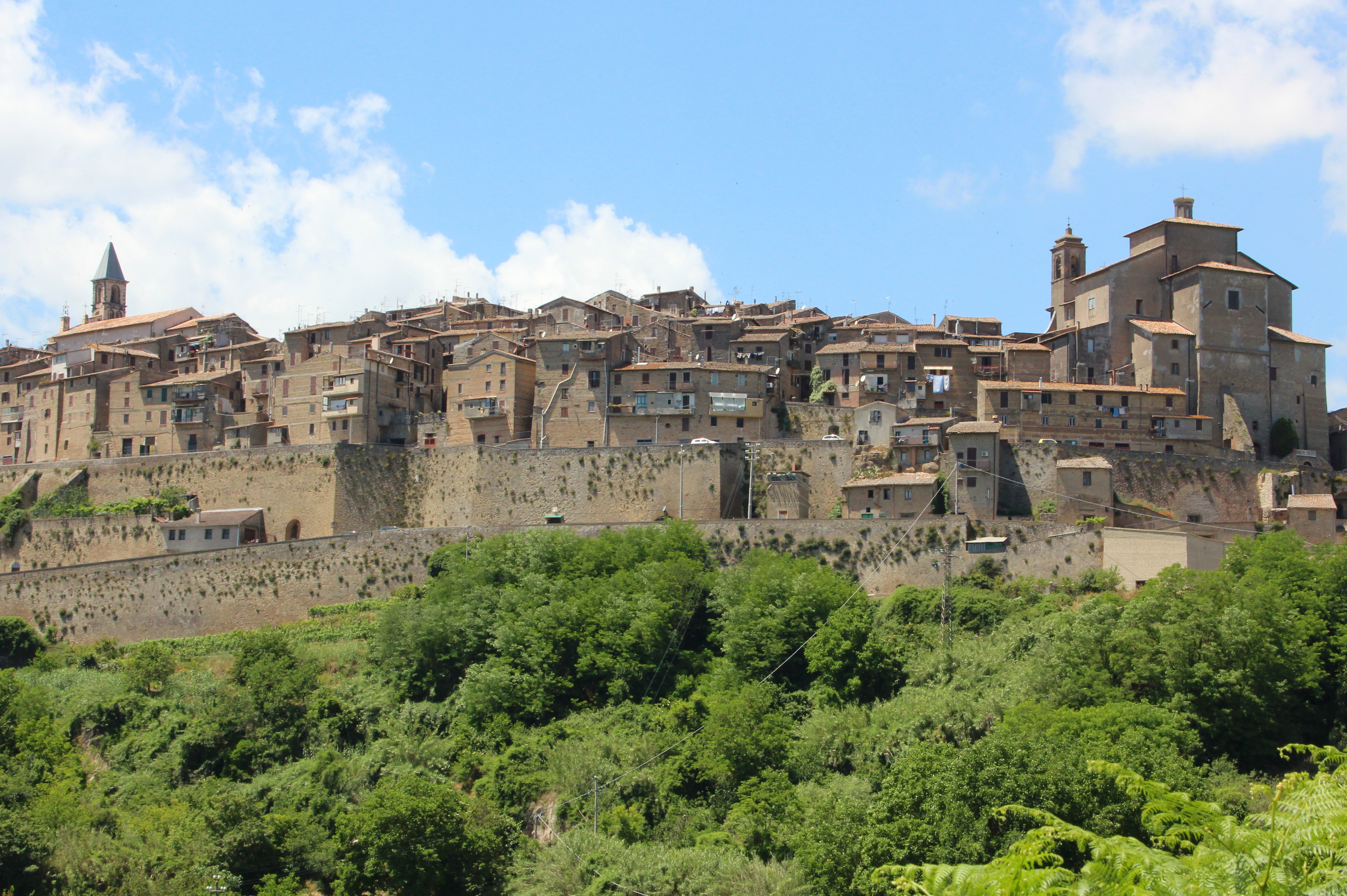

- Coat of arms

- Location within Italy Location within Lazio
- Coordinates: 42°40′N 11°52′E
- Country: Italy
- Region: Lazio
- Province: Viterbo (VT)

Government
  - Mayor: Piero Camilli

Area
  - Total: 39.3 km^{2} (15.2 sq mi)
- Elevation: 467 m (1,532 ft)

Population (2008)
  - Total: 2,857
  - Density: 72.7/km^{2} (188/sq mi)
- Demonym: Grottani
- Time zone: UTC+1 (CET)
  - Summer (DST): UTC+2 (CEST)
- Postal code: 01025
- Dialing code: 0763

Grotte di Castro is a municipality (Italian: comune) in the Province of Viterbo in the Italian region of Latium, located about 100 kilometres (62 mi) northwest of Rome and about 35 kilometres (22 mi) northwest of Viterbo.
