= Lake Bolsena =

Crater lake in Italy

- Lago di Bolsena (Italian)
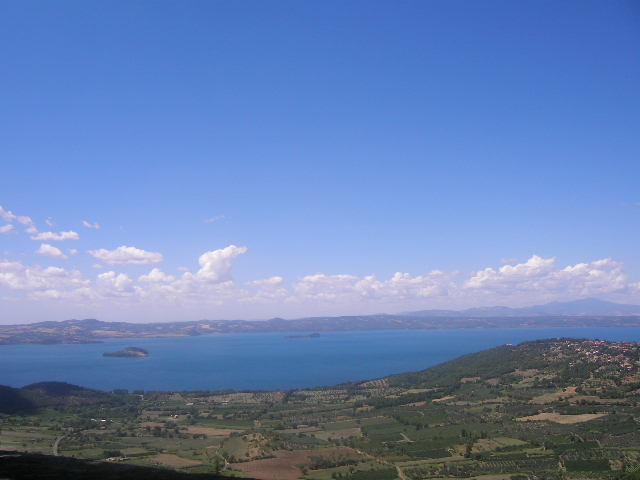

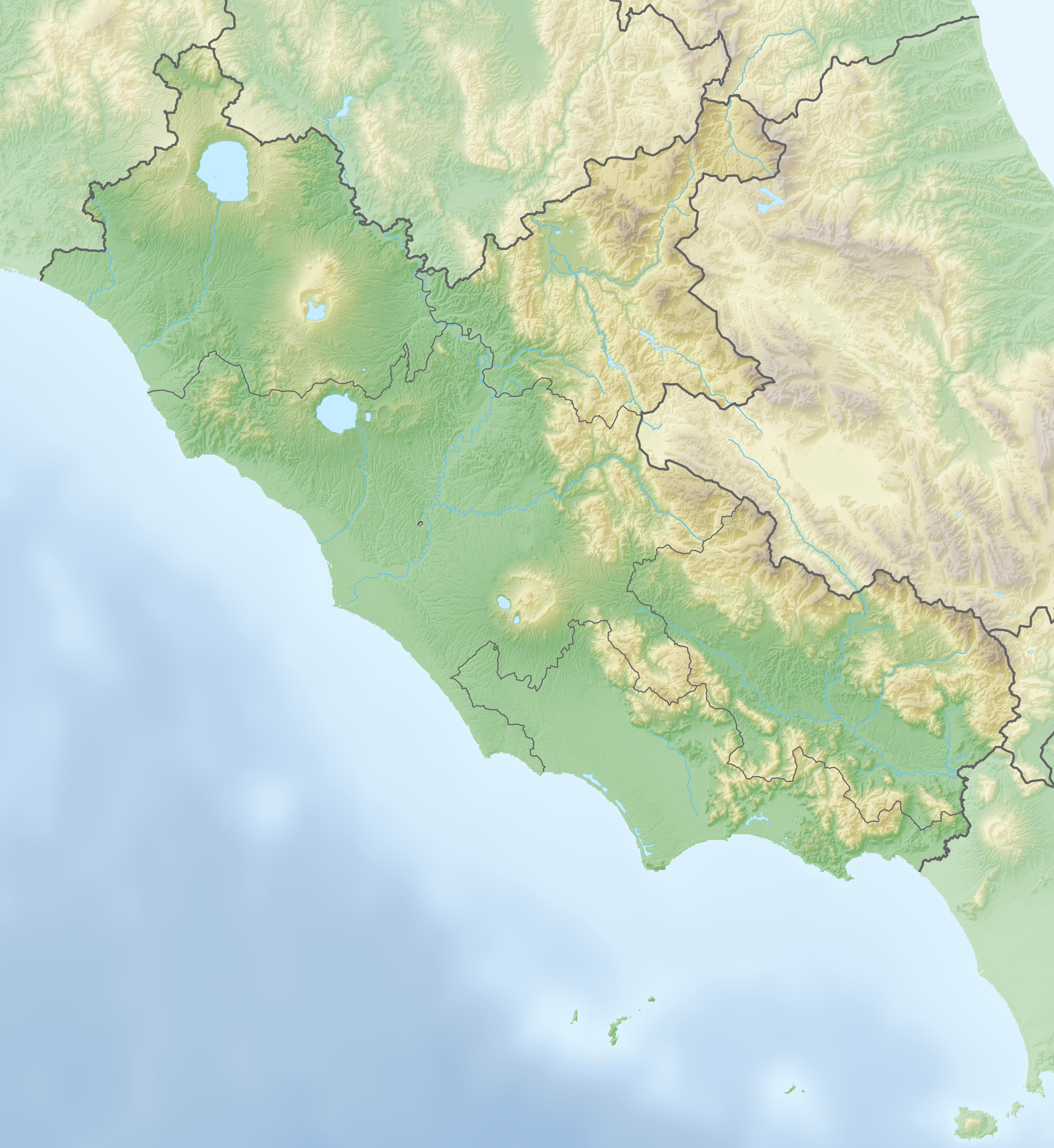
- Location within Lazio Location within Italy
- Location: Province of Viterbo, Central Italy
- Coordinates: 42°36′N 11°56′E
- Type: crater lake
- Primary inflows: None
- Primary outflows: Marta
- Catchment area: 159.5 km^{2} (61.6 sq mi)
- Basin countries: Italy
- Max. length: 13 km (8.1 mi)
- Max. width: 11 km (6.8 mi)
- Surface area: 113.5 km^{2} (43.8 sq mi)
- Average depth: 81 m (266 ft)
- Max. depth: 151 m (495 ft)
- Water volume: 9.2 km^{3} (3.2×10^{11} ft^{3})
- Residence time: 120 years
- Surface elevation: 305 m (1,001 ft)
- Islands: 2 (Bisentina, Martana)
- Settlements: see article
- References: see article

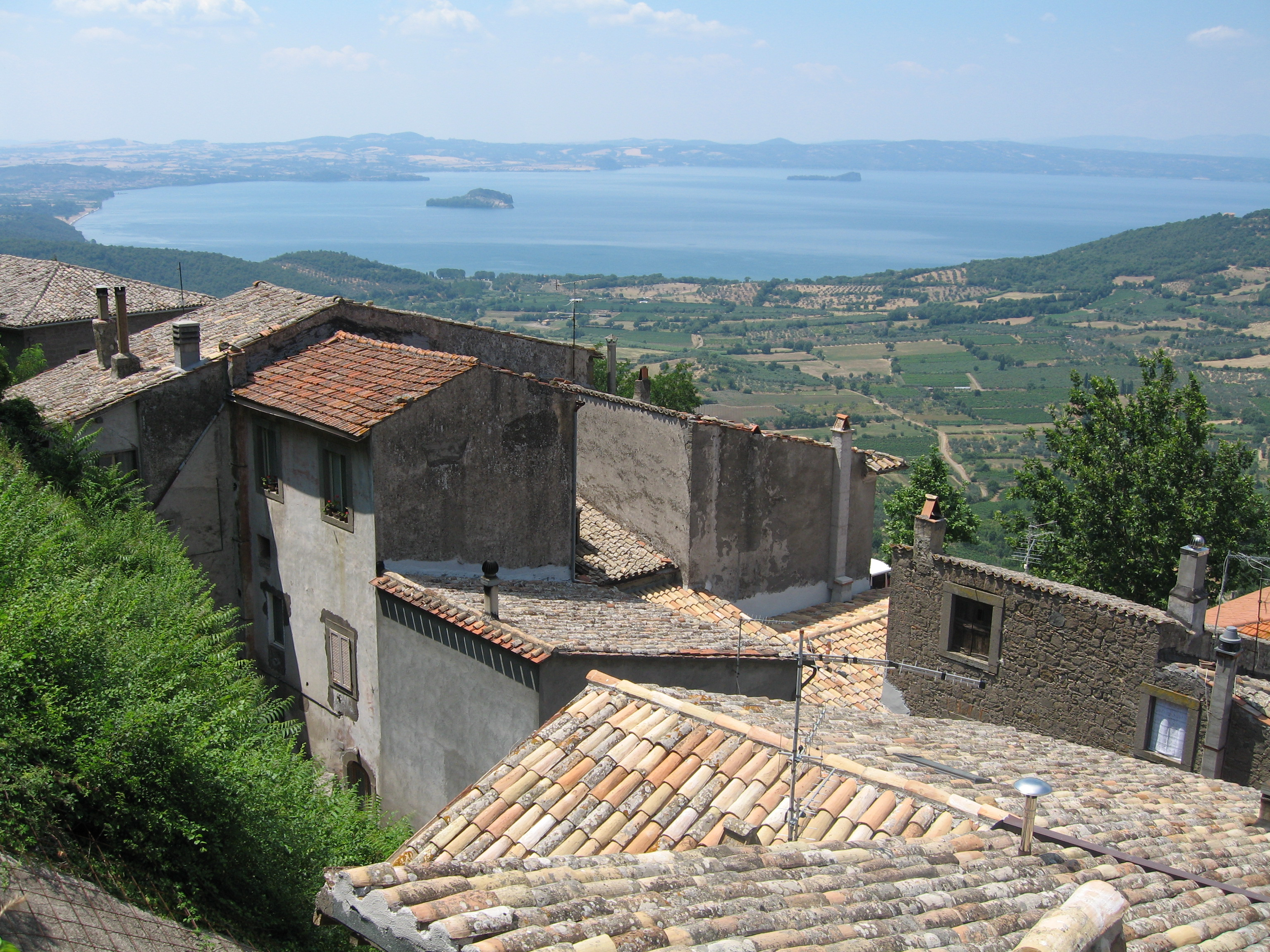
The southernmost end of the lake viewed from the ridge of Montefiascone caldera. Martana is on the left and Bisentino on the right. The straight shore to the far left is Marta. To the left of Martana is the headland of Capodimonte.

Lake Bolsena (Italian: Lago di Bolsena) is a lake of volcanic origin in the northern part of the province of Viterbo called Alto Lazio ("Upper Latium") or Tuscia in central Italy. It is the largest volcanic lake in Europe. Roman historic records indicate activity of the Vulsini volcano occurred as recently as 104 BC; it has been dormant since then. The two islands in the southern part of the lake were formed by underwater eruptions following the collapse that created the depression.

The lake is supplied entirely from the aquifer, rainfall and runoff, with one outlet at the southern end. A sewage treatment plant constructed in 1996 filters most of the raw sewage from the major surrounding communities, transported via pipeline to the facility on the Marta River. Fertilizers are a second source of contamination. The chemical content of the lake is monitored at several stations around it.

The lake has a long historic tradition. The Romans called it Lacus Volsinii, adapting the Etruscan name, Velzna, of the last Etruscan city to hold out against Rome, which was translocated after 264 BC, and its original location today has not been securely identified. The lake is bordered on one side by a modernized version of the Roman consular road Via Cassia. In addition to the historic sites of all periods, Lake Bolsena is currently surrounded by numerous tourist establishments, largely for camping, agrotourism and bed and breakfasts.

One third of the lake was donated to the Catholic church by the noble family Alberici of Orvieto. In recognition of the donation, the Alberici family was honored with a ceremony three times a year performed by the Bishop of Orvieto.

== Geography ==
The lake has an oval shape typical of crater lakes. The long axis of the ellipse is aligned in a north–south direction. The bottom is roughly conical, reaching a maximum depth at a point in the middle. The entire lake is surrounded by hills on the flanks and summits of which are the comuni. The watershed was home to 22,000 permanent residents in 2004, and 35,000 in the summer season.

Elevations on the north of the lake are the highest, rising to 702 m (2,303 ft), some 305 m (1,001 ft) above the lake's surface. On the northern rim of the caldera is San Lorenzo Nuovo ("New Saint Lawrence"), which was moved from an older site (a hypothetical San Lorenzo Vecchio, "Old Saint Lawrence") further down the slope to avoid malaria. The northern shore of the lake once featured marshes, breeding grounds for the mosquitos that carry the disease. Currently it is agricultural. At the site of old San Lorenzo are Etruscan antiquities. To the north of San Lorenzo Nuovo and the caldera rim is Acquapendente.

The hills to the east are 600 m (2,000 ft) to 650 m (2,130 ft). Bolsena extends upward on the northeast shore, with Orvieto 14 km (8.7 mi) further to the northeast, at the edge of the volcanic region. On the southeast of the lake is Montefiascone at an elevation of 633 m (2,077 ft), up on the ridge of Montefiascone caldera. To the south of the lake is Marta, on the right bank of the Marta River, sole effluent of the lake. The shore there is straight and developed. Elevations are within 100 m (330 ft) of the lake. Next to Marta are Valentano and Capodimonte, the latter being built on and around nearly the only headland on the lake, which forms a protective harbor. About 15 km (9.3 mi) to the south are Tuscania and Viterbo, the latter being the regional capital.

From Valentano north is the Latera caldera, a shallow crater perhaps half the size of Lake Bolsena, with Lake Mezzano (usually too small for the map) at the western end. On its north rim is Latera. The floor of the caldera is mainly agricultural although the uncultivable rocky lava flows have been left forested. Although the hills on the west side of Lake Bolsena are only slightly higher than those on the south, the terrain is somewhat too rough for settlement. Fields extend as far as they can into v-shaped valleys and there is no flat shore.

The hills to the north loom over the lake. At their western edge are Grotte di Castro and Gradoli.

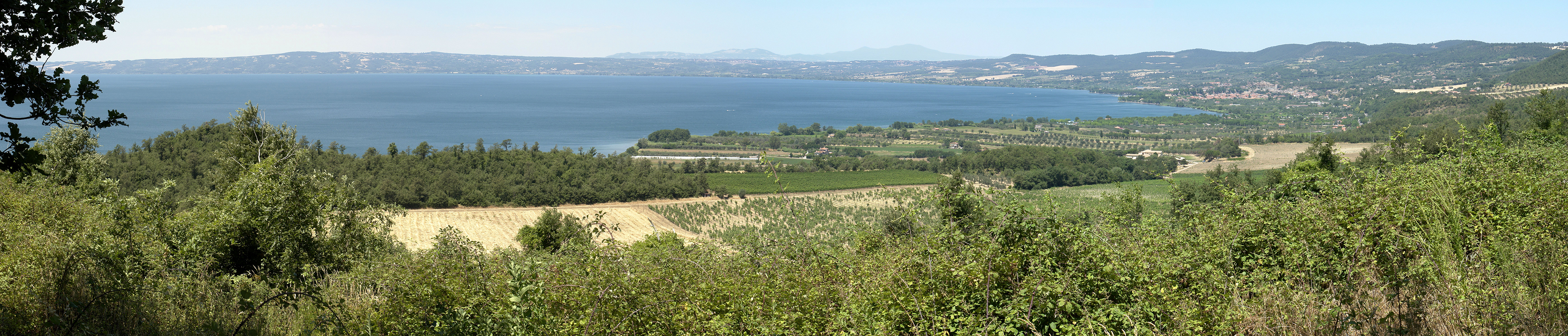
The western and northern shores viewed from the eastern shore. The large settlement to the right is Bolsena, at the foot of the northern hills.

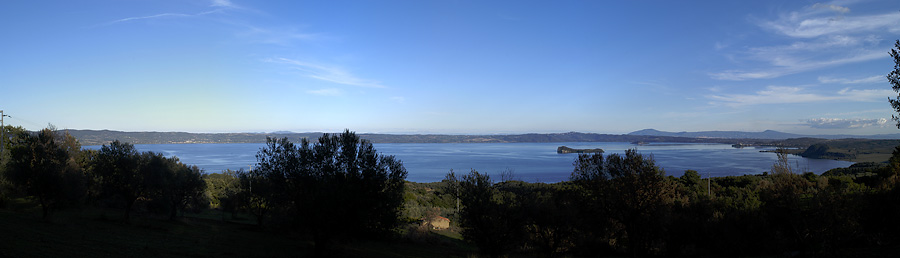
The eastern shore viewed from highway SS312 Castrense between Valentano and Latera on the western shore. Center is Bisentina, with Martana to the right and the headland of Capodimonte to the right of it. The city on the left of the far shore is Bolsena

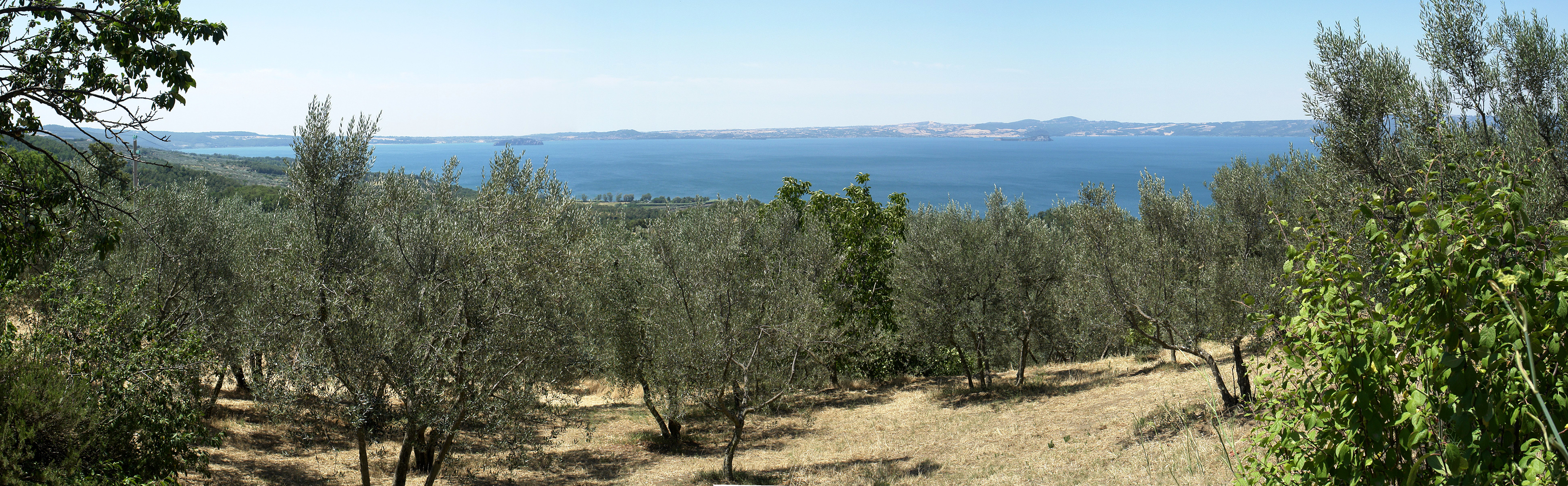
Northward view of the lake from the vicinity of Marta. Bolsena is visible in the far distance, as well as the two islands on the left.

== Geology ==
Lake Bolsena is at the center of the Vulsinii (or Vulsino) Volcanic District of the Roman Comagmatic Region. The lake formed when a circular area collapsed after the depletion of the underlying magmatic chamber that fed the whole volcanic district. Although it is generally known as a volcanic lake, like its southern neighbor Lake Bracciano it is not a crater lake nor does it occupy a caldera. The major calderas of the area are found close to the lake's rim (Latera to the west and Montefiascone to the south east).

== Islands ==
=== Bisentina ===
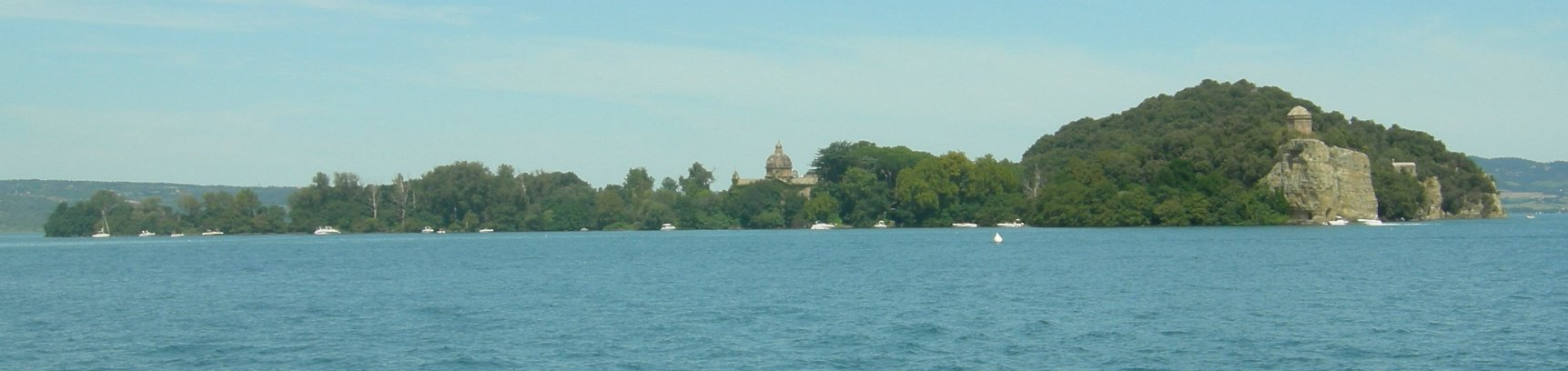
Isola Bisentina

Bisentina has an area of 17 ha (42 acres), making it the lake's largest island. It is accessible via a ferry service from Capodimonte. On the island are groves of evergreen oaks, Italian gardens, and various monuments: the church of Saint James and Saint Christopher with its cupola built by the architect Jacopo Barozzi da Vignola; the Franciscan convent; the Rocchina, a small temple dedicated to Saint Catherine. The latter was constructed in an octagonal floorplan by Antonio da Sangallo, over an Etruscan columbarium previously erected on a rocky outcrop on the lake. Another monument, the chapel of the Crucifix, contains frescos of the fifth century. The Malta dei Papi, a former prison for ecclesiastics found guilty of heresy, was shaped from a small cave with a trapdoor placed at a height of 20 m (66 ft). Mysterious in its creation, located under Mount Tabor, the highest point of the island, cited by Dante Alighieri as a life-prison. Malta dei Papi is a deep tunnel dug into the tuff at the end of which there is an underground chamber of about 6 meters built around a well, and above which there is a circular opening used to collect water. The waterproof plaster found on its inside walls reveal that the structure was used as a cistern in Roman Times. However, its origin is probably much older than that and linked to the volcanic thermal waters that flow underneath.

Forgotten after being turned for a long time into a stage of atrocities as a prison for heretics, this chamber became subject of occultist conversation in the late 19th century in Madame Blavatsky’s theosophic society, who considered this place to be one of the secret entrances to the underground kingdom of Agarthi, "the Inaccessible".

The Etruscans and the Romans left few traces of their stay on the island. In the 9th century it provided refuge from the incursions of the Saracens.

About 1250, it became the property of the lord of Bisenzio, who abandoned it and burned it following disagreements with the inhabitants of the island. In 1261, Urban IV reconquered it. The island was destroyed again in 1333 by Louis IV of Bavaria, accused of heresy and excommunicated by the pope. The property of the Farnese family from 1400 onwards, it had a period of prosperity and was visited by many popes.

In 1635, it was governed by Odoardo Farnese, duke of Castro, who entered into conflict with the Church, resulting in the total destruction of Castro. The two islands returned to the Church's control but were soon ceded again. The princess Beatrice Spada Potenziani, wife of the duke Fieschi Ravaschieri, owned it until its sale to a foundation in 2017.

=== Martana ===
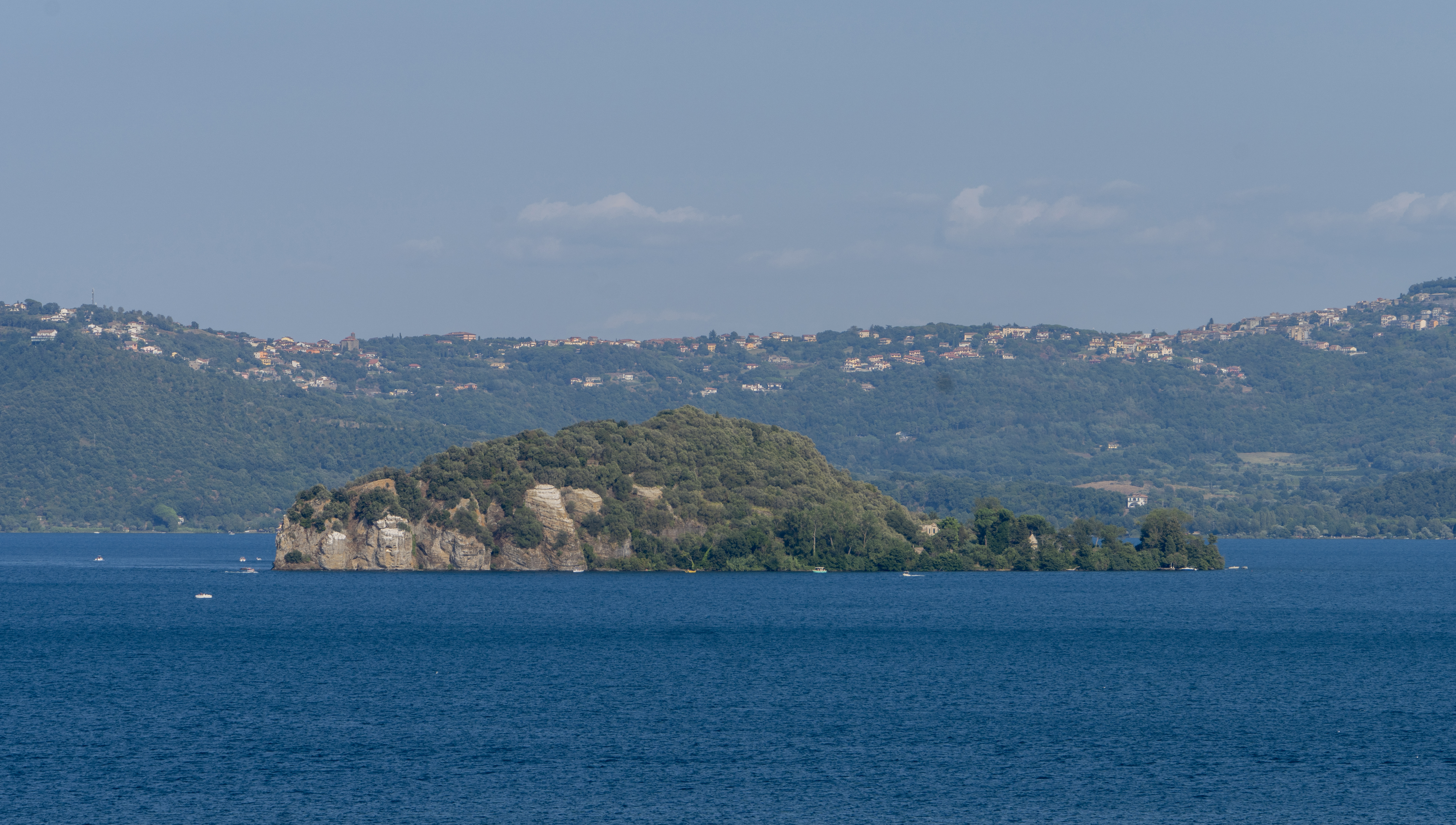
Isola Martana

Located opposite the town of Marta, the island of Martana is reputed to have once guarded the relics of Saint Christine to keep them from falling into the hands of the barbarians. Later, it is said that, during the dominion of the Ostrogothic Kingdom, their queen regnant Amalasuntha was assassinated there. Consequently causing the Invasion of Ostrogothic Kingdom by the Eastern Roman Empire due to the friendship between Amalasuntha and Roman Emperor Justinian I. Justinian used her death as a Casus belli for war.

The island is currently private property and no visitors are allowed.

== Marta outlet ==
The Marta is an emissary of Lake Bolsena to the east of the community of Marta, emptying into the Tyrrhenian Sea. After passing through Marta, Tuscania and Tarquinia, it reaches the sea near Lido di Tarquinia. Salt pans have been constructed between its mouth and that of the Mignone river.

== Comuni bordering the lake ==
The following comuni are situated on the shore of Lake Bolsena:

- Bolsena
- Montefiascone
- Marta
- Capodimonte
- Valentano
- Gradoli
- Grotte di Castro
- San Lorenzo Nuovo

Each has a designated length of beach for summer swimming. Some of these have facilities such as cafés, restaurants and boat rentals.

Other nearby towns are Sorano, Pitigliano, Acquapendente and Orvieto, with Onano to the northwest.

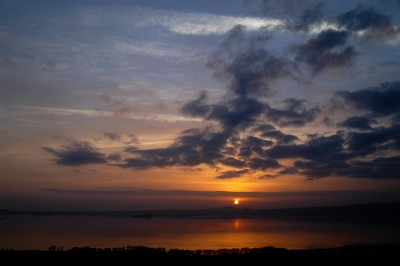
Sunset over Lake Bolsena

== Films ==
- Tucci in Italy, Season 1, Episode 5 (2025)

== See also ==
- Lake Mezzano
- Orvieto

== Bibliography ==
- Mosello, Rosario; Arisci, Silvia; Bruni, Piero (2004). "Lake Bolsena (Central Italy): an updating study on its water chemistry" (PDF). Journal of Limnology. 63 (1): 1–12. doi:10.4081/jlimnol.2004.1. Archived from the original (PDF) on 20 May 2005.
- Washington, Henry Stephens (1906). The Roman Comagmatic Region. Washington D. C.: Carnegie Institution of Washington.
