= Province of Viterbo =

Province of Italy

Coordinates: 42°25′7″N 12°6′15″E

Province of Viterbo Provincia di Viterbo (Italian)
- Province
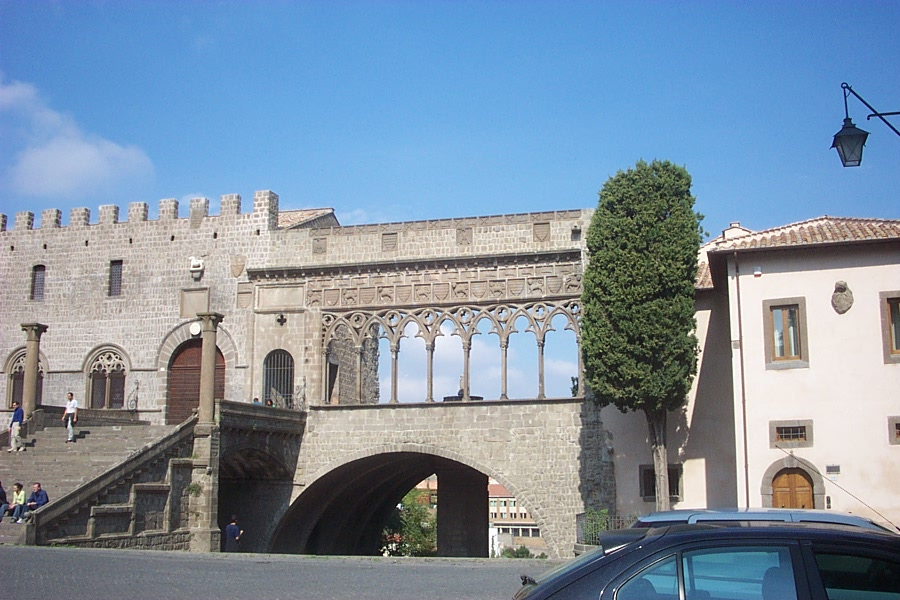
- Palazzo dei Papi (Palazzo Papale), in Viterbo

- Coat of arms

- Map with the Province of Viterbo in Italy
- Country: Italy
- Region: Lazio
- Capital: Viterbo
- Municipalities: 60

Government
  - President: Alessandro Romoli (FI)

Area
  - Total: 3,615.24 km^{2} (1,395.85 sq mi)

Population (2026)
  - Total: 307,812
  - Density: 85.1429/km^{2} (220.519/sq mi)

GDP
  - Total: €6.559 billion (2015)
  - Per capita: €20,425 (2015)
- Time zone: UTC+1 (CET)
  - Summer (DST): UTC+2 (CEST)
- Postal code: 01100, 010xx
- Telephone prefix: 0761, 0763, 0766, 06
- Vehicle registration: VT
- ISTAT code: 056
- Website: Official website

The Province of Viterbo (Italian: provincia di Viterbo) is a province in the region of Lazio in Italy. Its capital is the city of Viterbo.

It has a population of 307,812 in an area of 3,615.24 square kilometres (1,395.85 sq mi) across its 60 municipalities.

== History ==
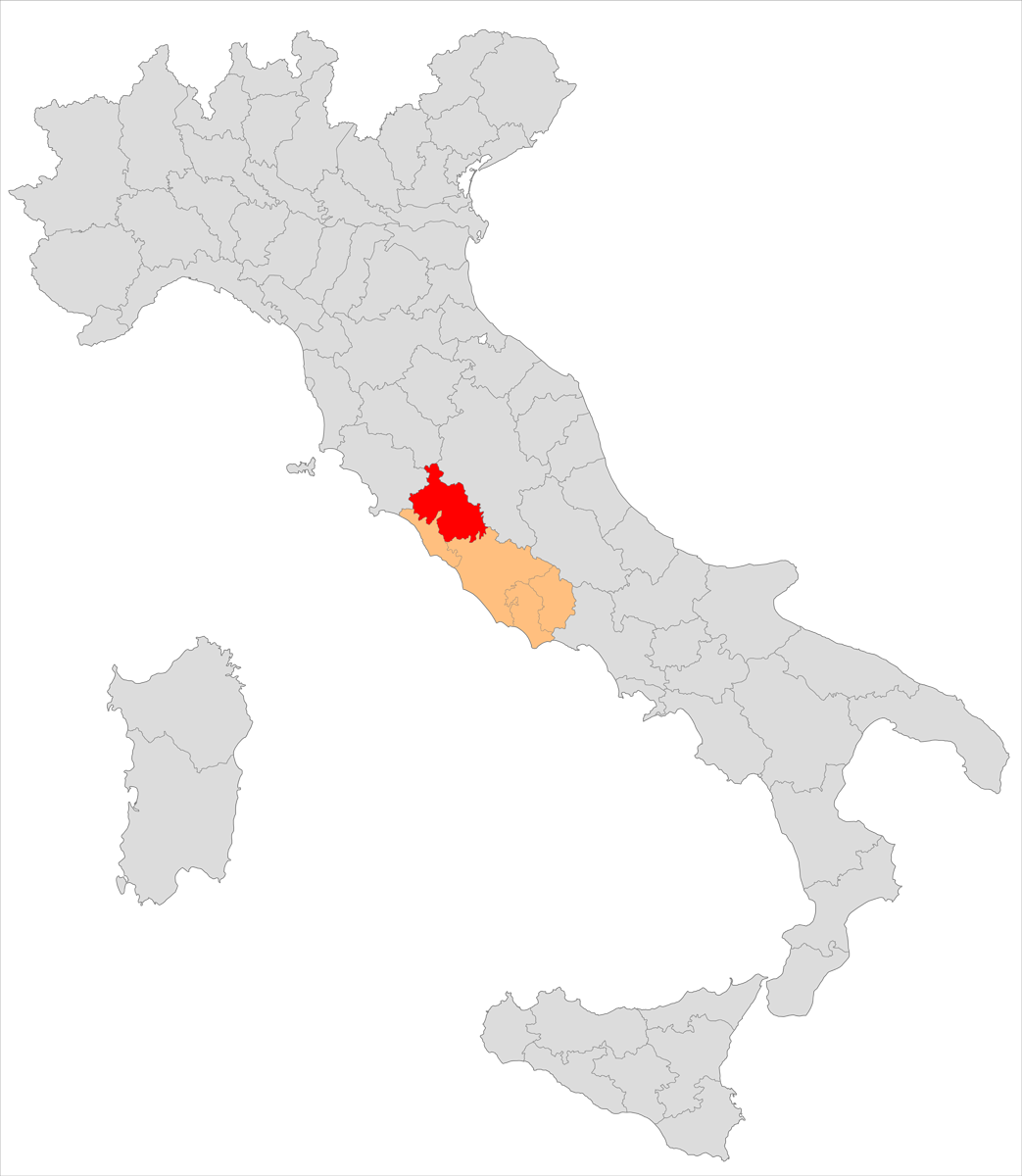
Circondario di Viterbo in the province of Rome in the 19 century

The area of the province of Viterbo contained a number of Etruscan cities including Tuscania, Vetralla, Tarquinia, and Viterbo. Viterbo was conquered by the Roman Republic in 310 BCE; despite this, minimal information is known of the city until it was utilised in 773 CE by Desiderius, King of the Lombards, as a base against the Holy Roman Empire. Matilda of Tuscany gifted the city to the papacy in the 11th century. Frederick Barbarossa was based in Viterbo as he planned to invade Rome in 1153, and he conquered the city in 1160 while preparing to attack Rome.

After a period as a free commune, in the early 13th century Viterbo became part of the Papal States. The Knights of Saint John were expelled from Rhodes in the 16th century and were temporarily granted refuge in Viterbo before they could travel to Malta. Pope Paul III described himself as a citizen of Viterbo and formed a university in the city. It joined the Kingdom of Italy on 12 September 1870. During World War II, Viterbo was heavily bombed.

== Geography ==
Viterbo is the most northerly of the provinces of Lazio. It is bordered to the south by the Metropolitan City of Rome Capital and to the south-east by the province of Rieti. It is also bordered by the regions of Tuscany (province of Grosseto) to the north and by Umbria (province of Terni) to the east. The Tyrrhenian Sea is located to the west.

The territory falls in and makes up the largest part of the historical region of Tuscia, with the name sometimes being used synonymously with that of the province.

As of 2017, the province has a total population of 318,163 inhabitants over an area of 3,615.24 square kilometres (1,395.85 mi^{2}), giving it a population density of 89.05 inhabitants per square kilometre. The provincial president is Marcello Meroi and the province contains 60 comuni (municipalities).

The territory of the Province of Viterbo can be roughly divided into four geographical areas:

- the coastal and flat area of the Lazio Maremma;
- the Alta Tuscia, which is more hilly and has a volcanic origin, corresponding to the areas near Tuscany and Lake Bolsena;
- the area of the Cimini Mountains around Lake Vico and the regions bordering the metropolitan city of Rome;
- lastly, the eastern part bordering Umbria, encompassing the areas bathed by the Tiber River.

It can be said that the city of Viterbo geographically belongs both to the Alta Tuscia and the Cimini area, as it is located right below the mountains, yet at a short distance from Lake Bolsena.

== Government ==
=== Municipalities ===
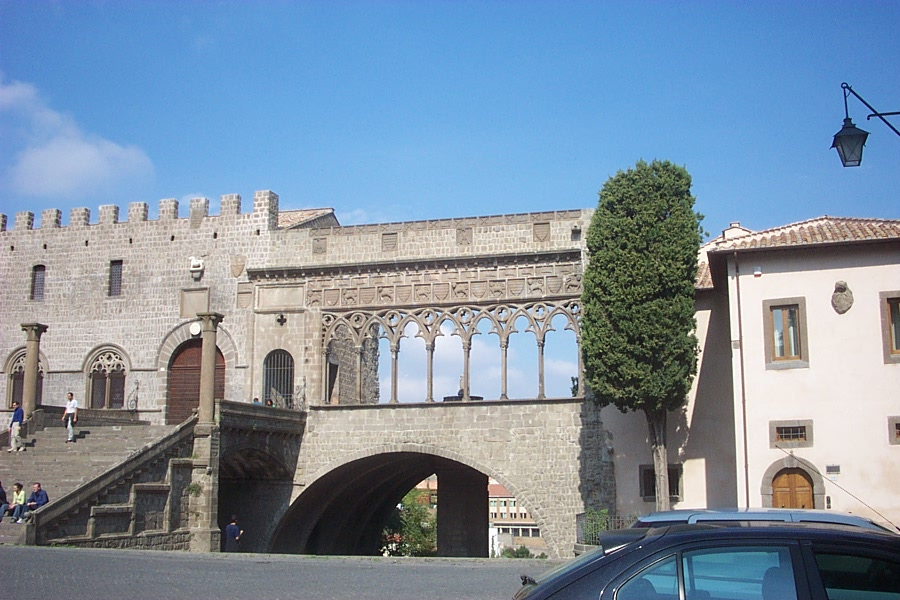
Viterbo, Palazzo dei Papi (Palazzo Papale)

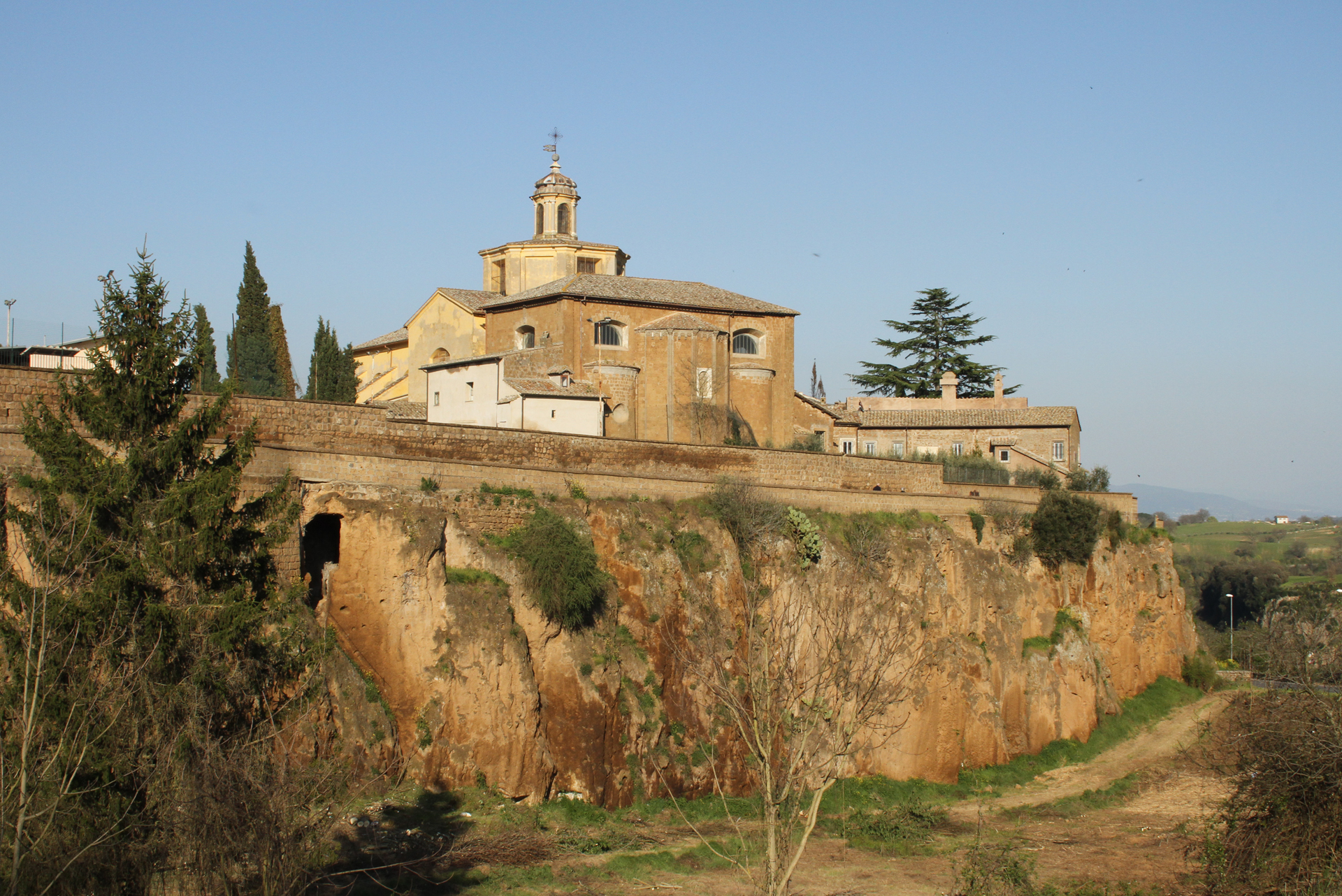
Panorama of the walls of Civita Castellana

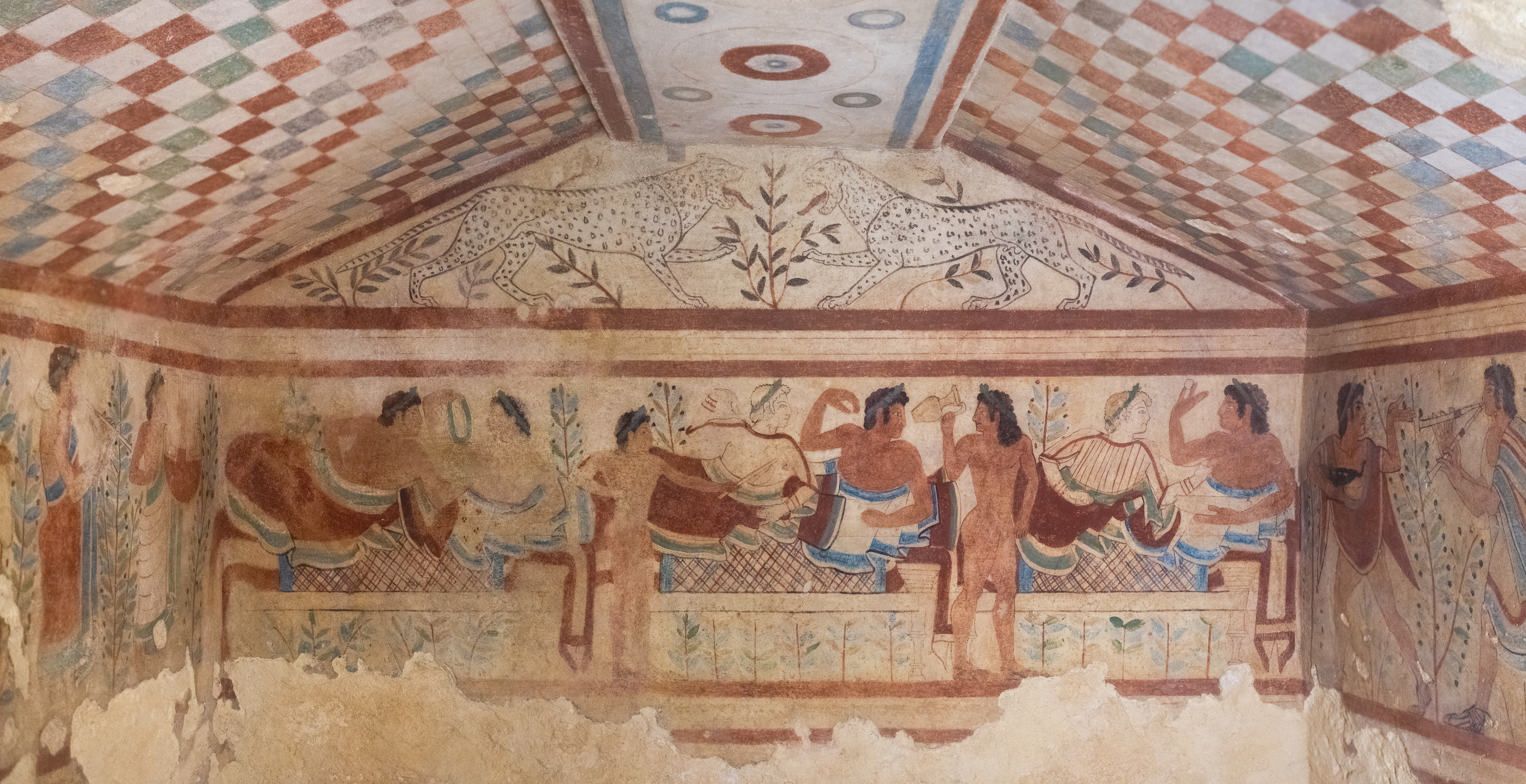
Tarquinia, wall painting in the Tomb of the Leopards

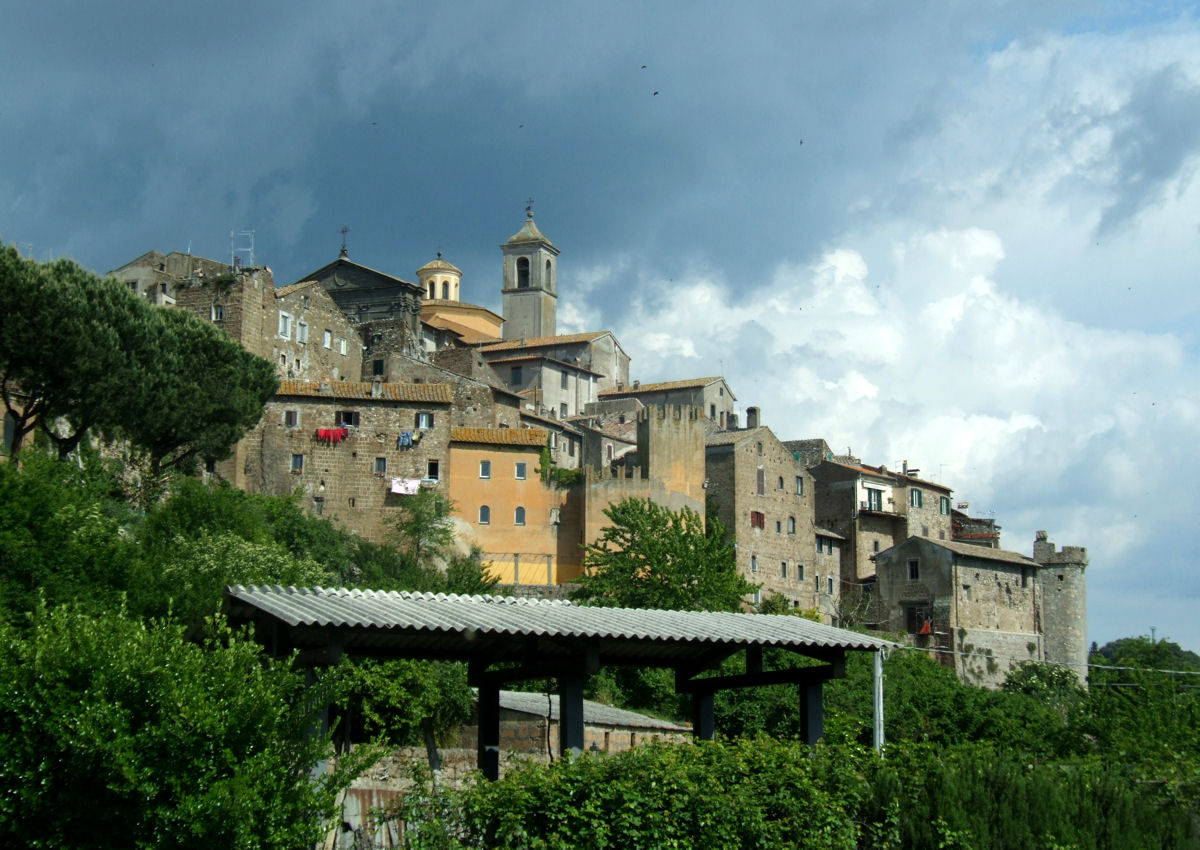
Vetralla

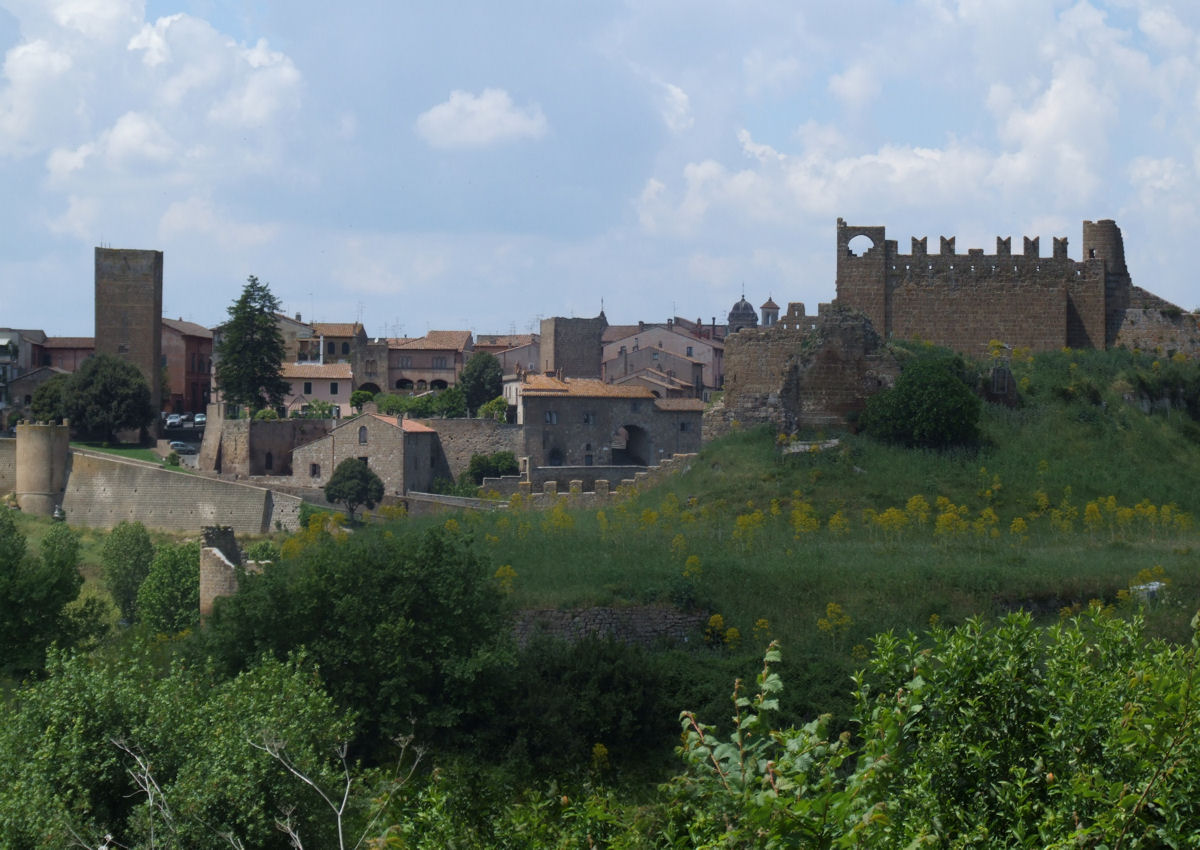
Tuscania

The province has 60 municipalities:

- Acquapendente
- Arlena di Castro
- Bagnoregio
- Barbarano Romano
- Bassano in Teverina
- Bassano Romano
- Blera
- Bolsena
- Bomarzo
- Calcata
- Canepina
- Canino
- Capodimonte
- Capranica
- Caprarola
- Carbognano
- Castel Sant'Elia
- Castiglione in Teverina
- Celleno
- Cellere
- Civita Castellana
- Civitella d'Agliano
- Corchiano
- Fabrica di Roma
- Faleria
- Farnese
- Gallese
- Gradoli
- Graffignano
- Grotte di Castro
- Ischia di Castro
- Latera
- Lubriano
- Marta
- Montalto di Castro
- Monte Romano
- Montefiascone
- Monterosi
- Nepi
- Onano
- Oriolo Romano
- Orte
- Piansano
- Proceno
- Ronciglione
- San Lorenzo Nuovo
- Soriano nel Cimino
- Sutri
- Tarquinia
- Tessennano
- Tuscania
- Valentano
- Vallerano
- Vasanello
- Vejano
- Vetralla
- Vignanello
- Villa San Giovanni in Tuscia
- Viterbo
- Vitorchiano

== Demographics ==
As of 2026, the population is 307,812, of which 49.5% are male, and 50.5% are female. Minors make up 13.3% of the population, and seniors make up 26.7%.

Historical population

Year	Pop.	±%
1861	-	—
1871	163,810	—
1881	166,803	+1.8%
1901	195,092	+17.0%
1911	204,471	+4.8%
1921	215,535	+5.4%
1931	227,984	+5.8%
1936	234,180	+2.7%

Year	Pop.	±%
1951	258,678	+10.5%
1961	263,862	+2.0%
1971	257,075	−2.6%
1981	268,448	+4.4%
1991	278,521	+3.8%
2001	288,783	+3.7%
2011	312,864	+8.3%
2021	308,737	−1.3%

Source: ISTAT

=== Immigration ===
As of 2025, immigrants make up 12.2% of the population. The 5 largest foreign countries of birth are Romania, Albania, Ukraine, Morocco, and Bangladesh.
