= Latera =

- Comune
- Comune di Latera
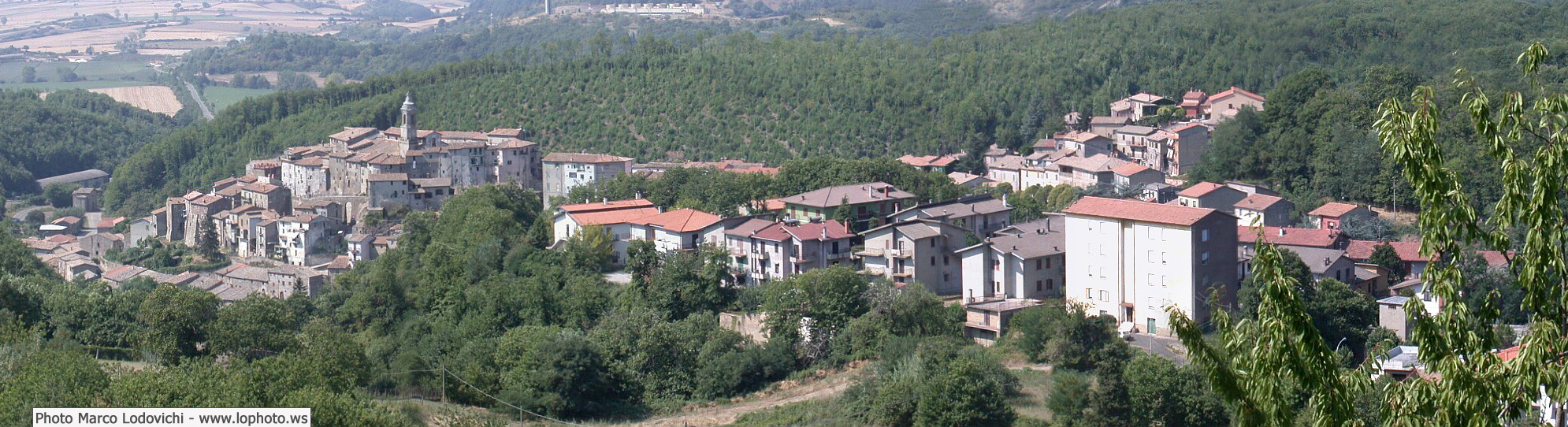

- Coat of arms

- Location within Italy Location within Lazio
- Coordinates: 42°37′N 11°49′E
- Country: Italy
- Region: Lazio
- Province: Viterbo (VT)
- Frazioni: Cantoniera di Latera, La Buca

Government
  - Mayor: Francesco Di Biagi

Area
  - Total: 22.43 km^{2} (8.66 sq mi)
- Elevation: 508 m (1,667 ft)

Population (1 January 2019)
  - Total: 811
  - Density: 36.2/km^{2} (93.6/sq mi)
- Demonym: Lateresi
- Time zone: UTC+1 (CET)
  - Summer (DST): UTC+2 (CEST)
- Postal code: 01010
- Dialing code: 0761
- Patron saint: St. Clement
- Saint day: 23 November
- Website: Official website

Latera is a small town and comune in the Province of Viterbo, Lazio, central Italy. Stephen Owen considers it to be an "archetypal" Italian hill town.

Situated near Bolsena Lake and Mezzano Lake, is important for volcanic underground activity near the town centre. It has a small rock with a medieval palace by Farnese family, surrounded by medieval stone houses.

== History ==
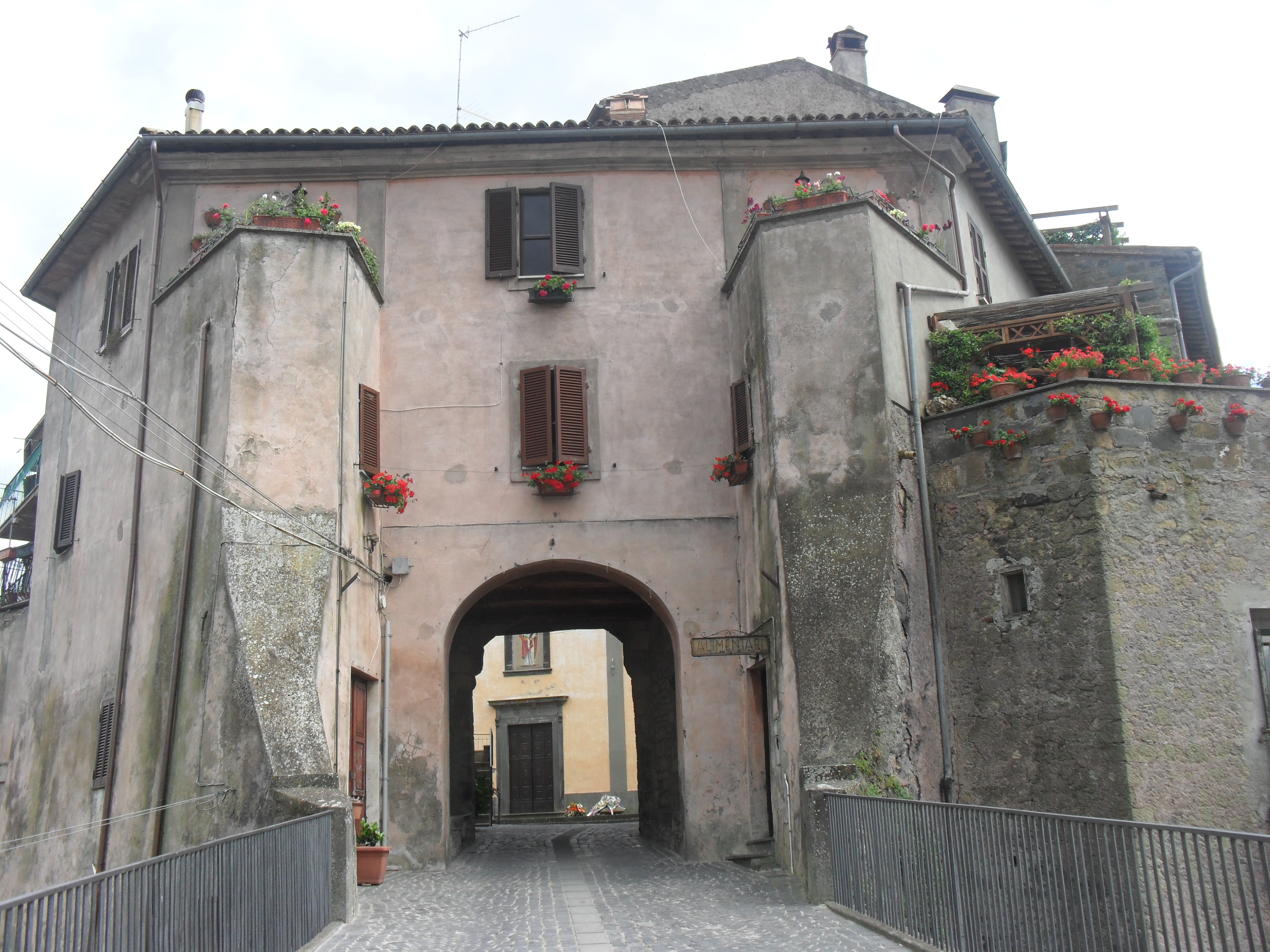
Entrance to the Ducal Castle of Latera

Latera and its castle are known by documents from around the beginning of the 12th century. It began its long-lasting link with the Farnese family in 1408, when Pope Gregory XII conceded vicardom of the city to Ranuccio Farnese (1390–1450), creating with the namesake city of Farnese a Duchy independent from that of the nearby Castro, which later became capital of the Duchy of Castro. The House of Farnese reigned over the Duchy of Latera until 1650, when it was subsumed back into the Papal States. The last ruler was Pietro Francesco Farnese, Duke of Latera, General of the Spanish Army (1592–1662).

== Main sights ==
- The Palace of Ranuccio Farnese
- The Three Fountains
- Museum of Earth, inaugurated in 1999

== See also ==
- Wars of Castro

== Sources ==
- Owen, Stephen (2003). "The Appearance of English Hill Towns in the Landscape". Journal of Urban Design. 8 (1). Informa UK Limited: 3–25. doi:10.1080/1357480032000064746. ISSN 1357-4809.
