= Lake Mezzano =

Lake Mezzano Lago di Mezzano
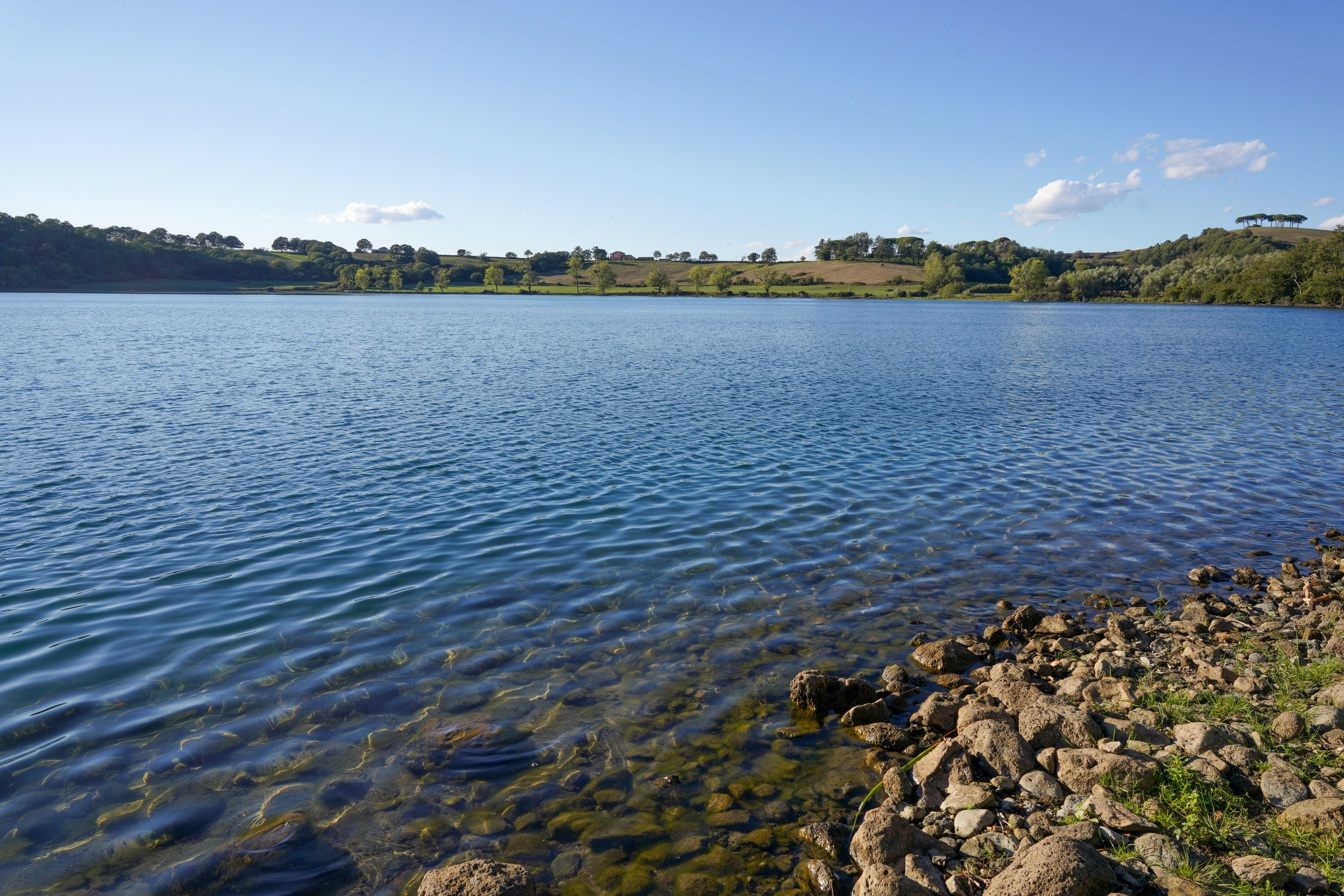

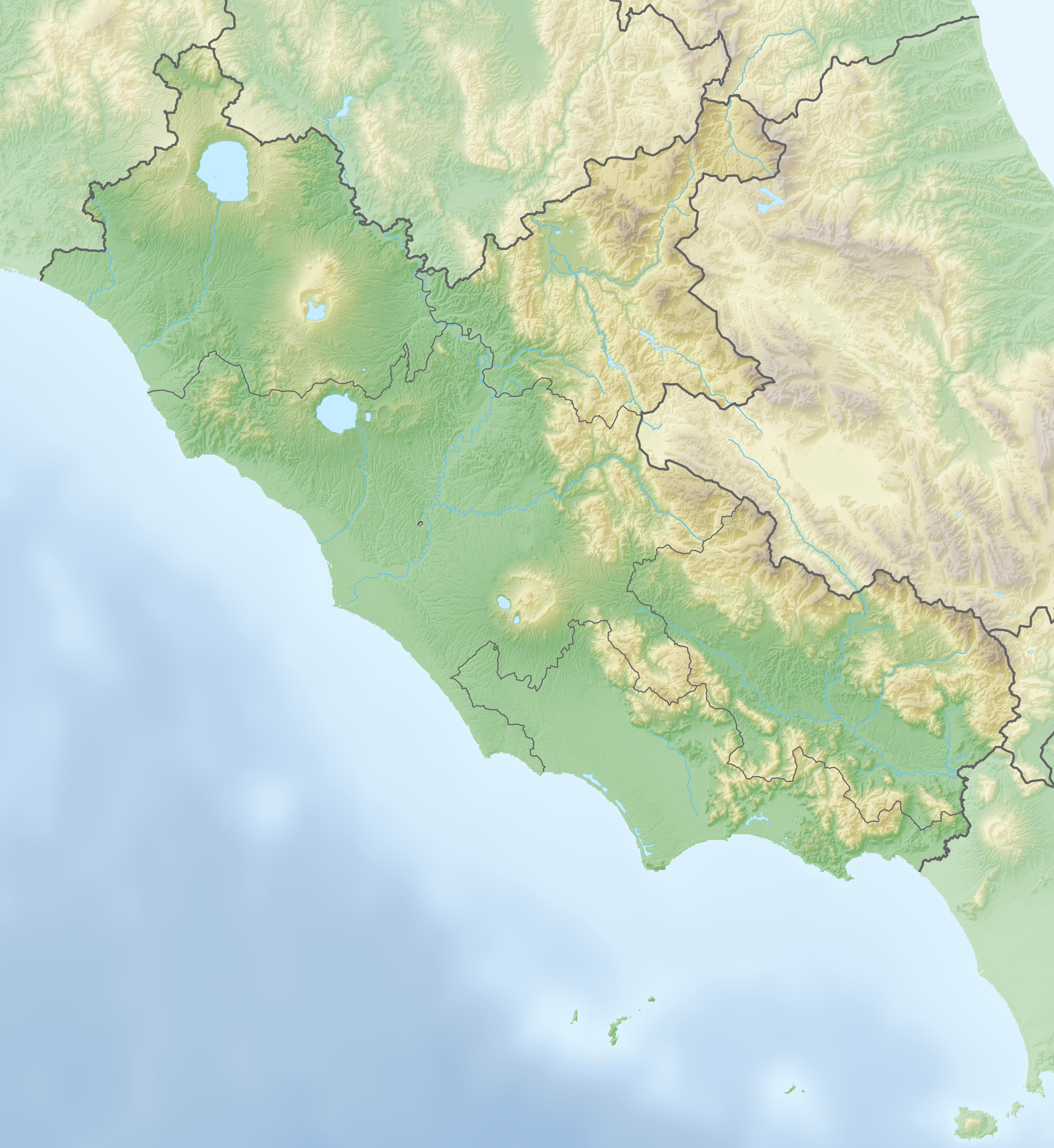
- Location within Lazio
- Location: Valentano, Viterbo
- Coordinates: 42°36′42″N 11°46′11″E
- Type: crater lake
- Primary outflows: Olpeta
- Basin countries: Italy
- Surface area: 475,000 m^{2} (117 acres)
- Max. depth: 38 m (125 ft)
- Surface elevation: 452 m (1,483 ft)

Lake Mezzano (Italian: Lago di Mezzano; Latin: Lacus Statoniensis) is a small crater lake of central Italy, of volcanic origin, which was formed 400,000 years ago.

The lake has a circular shape typical of crater lakes. Its surface area is 475,000 m^{2} the altitude of its surface is 452 m and has a perimeter of 2,516 m.

Lake Mezzano is drained by the river Olpeta, a tributary of the river Fiora.

The lake lies in the territory of the community of Valentano (VT).

In the 1980s an archaeological campaign brought back to light a number of historical and prehistorical findings. Many of those are now exhibited in the Museo della Preistoria e della Rocca Farnese in Valentano.
