= Costume museum =

Costume museum may refer to:

- Costume Museum of Canada
- Costume Museum (Kastoria)

Other costume museums:

- Centre National du Costume de Scene, France
- Devonshire Collection of Period Costume, England
- Korea Museum of Modern Costume
- Museum of Ayrshire Country Life and Costume, Scotland
- Museum of the History of the Greek Costume, Greece
- National Museum of Costume, Scotland
- National Museum of Costume and Fashion, Portugal

== See also ==
- Fashion museum
- Textile museums
