= Museum of Farnese Garments =

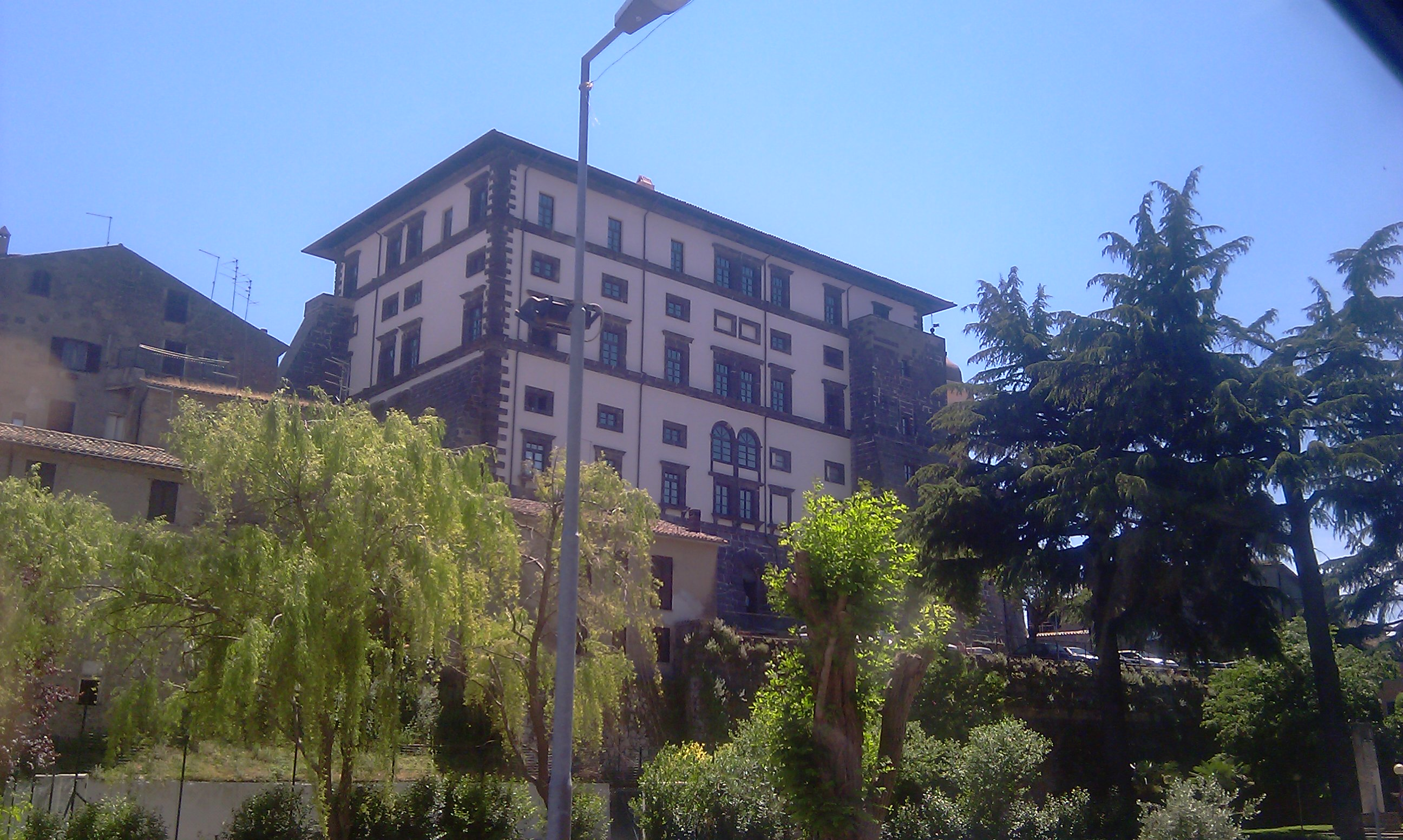
- Established: December 1998
- Location: (Italy) Gradoli, Viterbo
- Coordinates: 42.6441°N 11.8561°E
- Type: Fashion museum

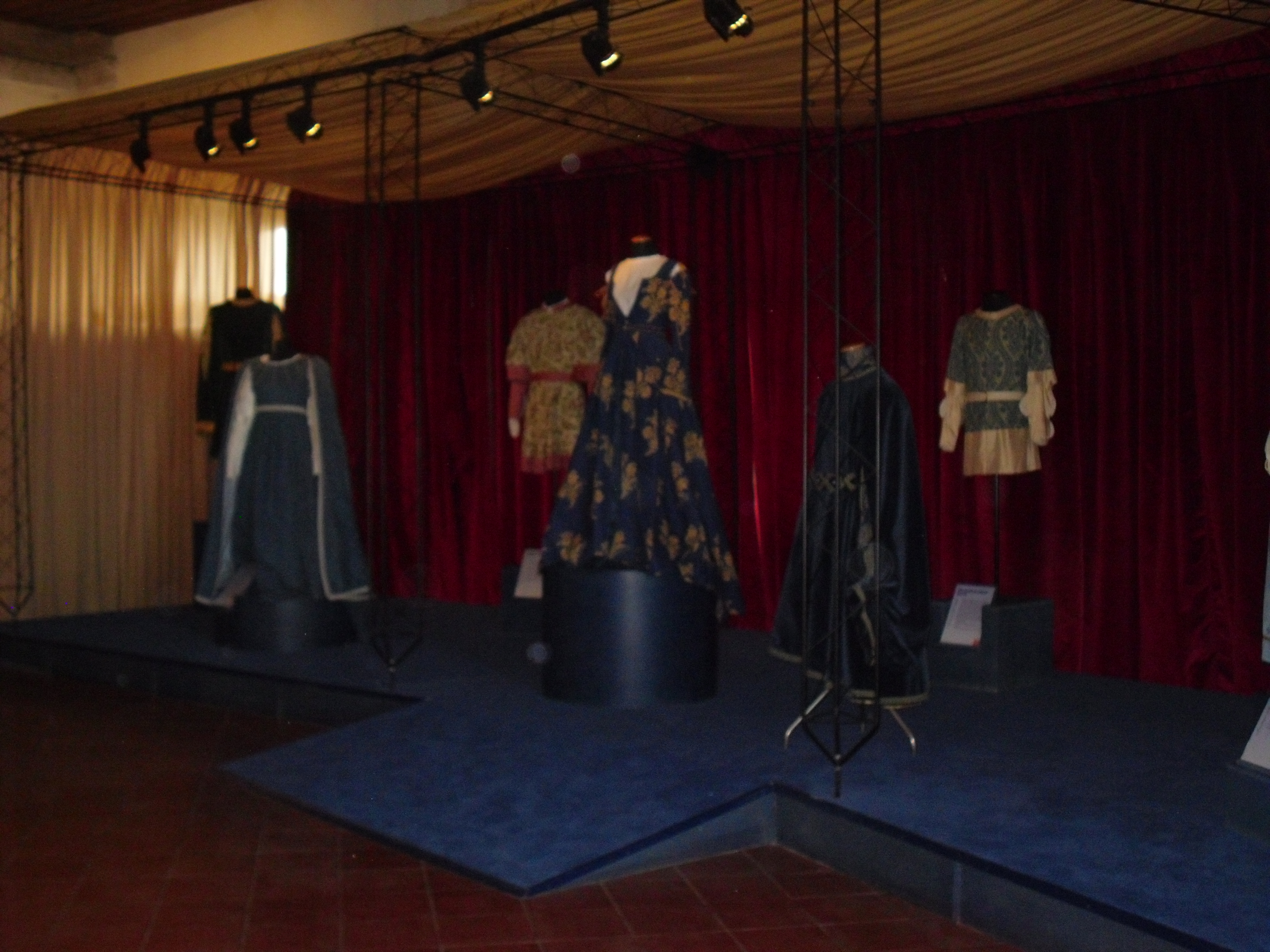
First room

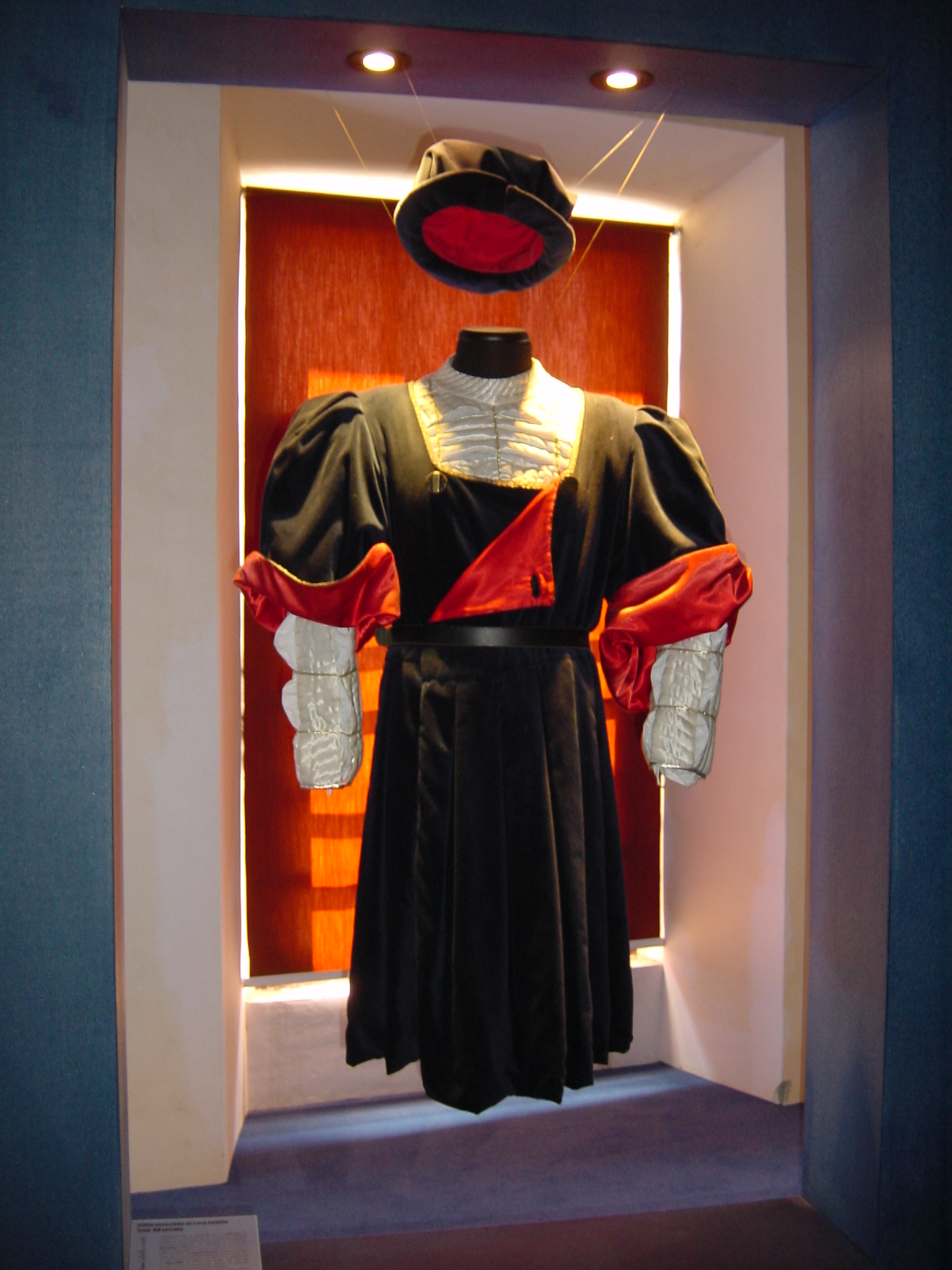
Male cloth with hat

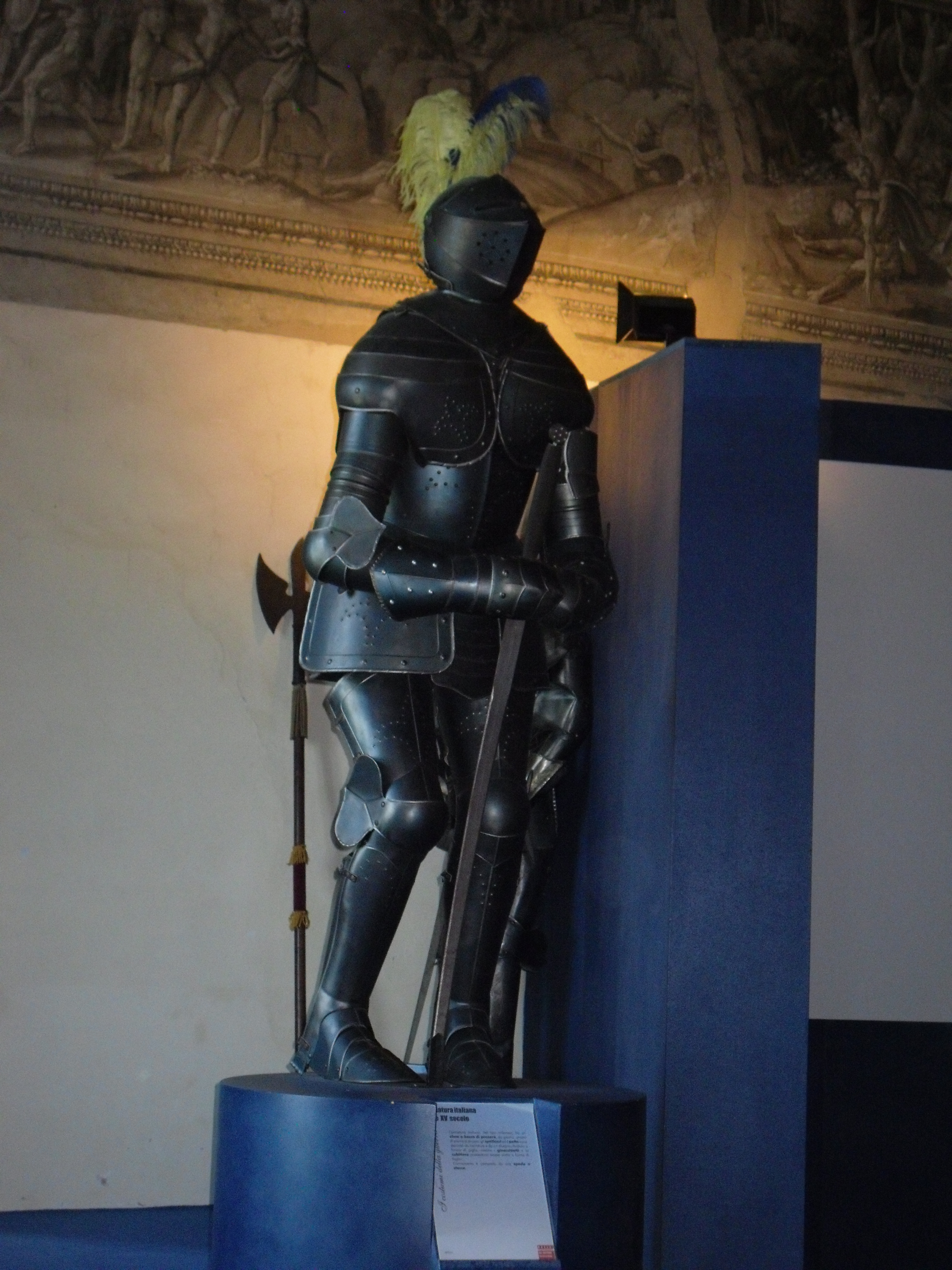
Armor

The Museum of Farnese Garments is on the third and fourth floor of Palazzo Farnese in Gradoli, Viterbo, Italy. It was inaugurated in December 1998.

The Museum is divided into different rooms, where there are large reproductions of clothes of both the nobility and commoners, including underwear, accessories, weapons, armors and jewelry of the Renaissance.

The clothes have been recreated by observation of frescoes, painting and prints of the 15th, 16th and 17th centuries.

== Exhibition ==
=== First room (Loggione) ===
Inside the first room, called "Loggione", clothes for ceremonies male and female of the 1400 are displayed. There is French style in these garments. This room is called "Loggione" because it was a balcony during the age of Farnese; in fact the frescoes in this room show the landscapes outside the palace.

=== Second room (Underwear and accessories) ===
There is one inner section underwear and accessories: underwear, gloves, hats, socks, shoes and many other accessories for both man and women.

=== Third room (Weapons and armors) ===
This is the armory and Monochrome frescoes. The hall decorated with monochrome frescoes depicting naval and land battles show. It has armors and clothes of the 16th century.

Inside this room there is watch a video on costume, fashion and everyday life of the Renaissance.

=== Fourth room ===
In this room there are a lot of clothes of the 16th century with a Spanish style coming from Bourbon domination in Italy. The clothes used came from the textile centres of Florence and Venice. These clothes ore: velvet, damask, brocade and silk. In the center of the room is Pope Paolo III (Alessandro Farnese) with the cope embroidered with golden lilies.

=== Fifth room ===
In this room there is an original loom of the end of the 1800 and several tools for the manufacture of wool and hemp such as spindles, bobbins, carding combs and scutch ammaccatoi. There is also the exposition pitchers, baskets, old irons and colander for pasta and ricotta.

=== Sixth room (Wedding hall) ===
The sixth room has a reproduction of the scene of the marriage of Ottavio Farnese and Margaret of Austria.

=== Multimedia hall ===
In this room people can watch multimedia and interactive videos with educational games and a virtual tour of the museum. There are also classrooms and laboratories for the creation of art workshops in painting on fabric and Renaissance fresco.

== Gallery ==
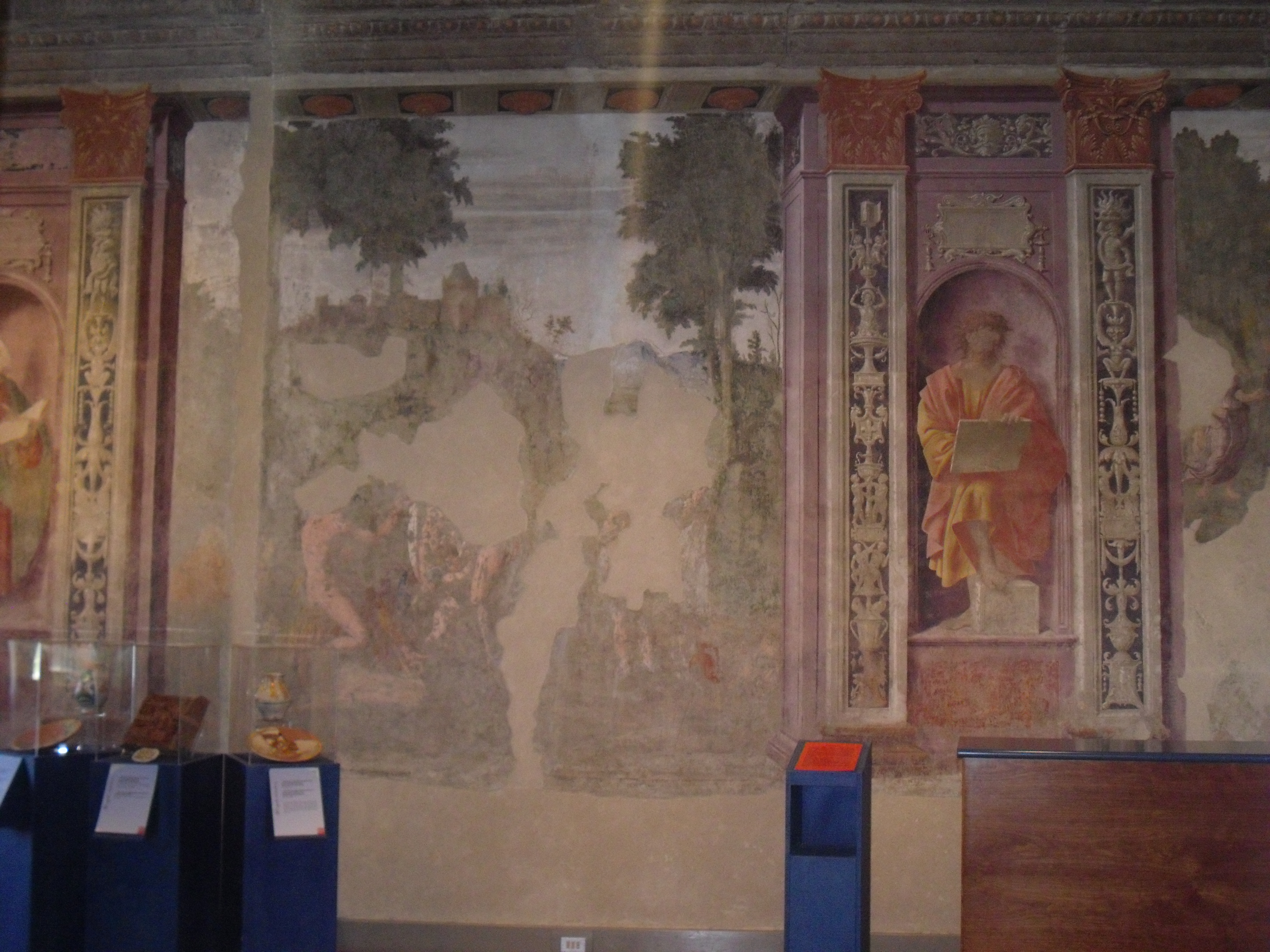
Fresco on first room

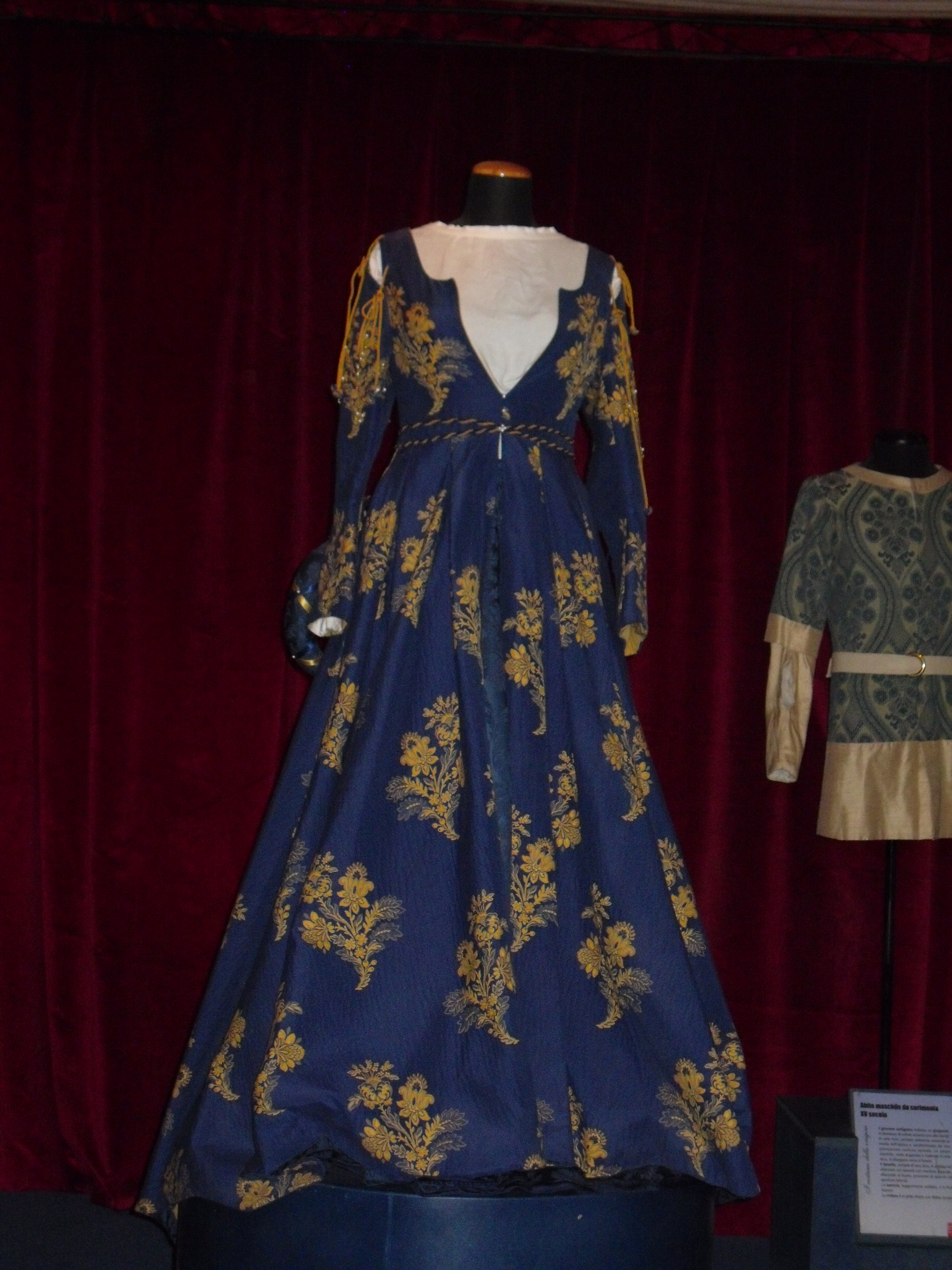
Female dress on first room

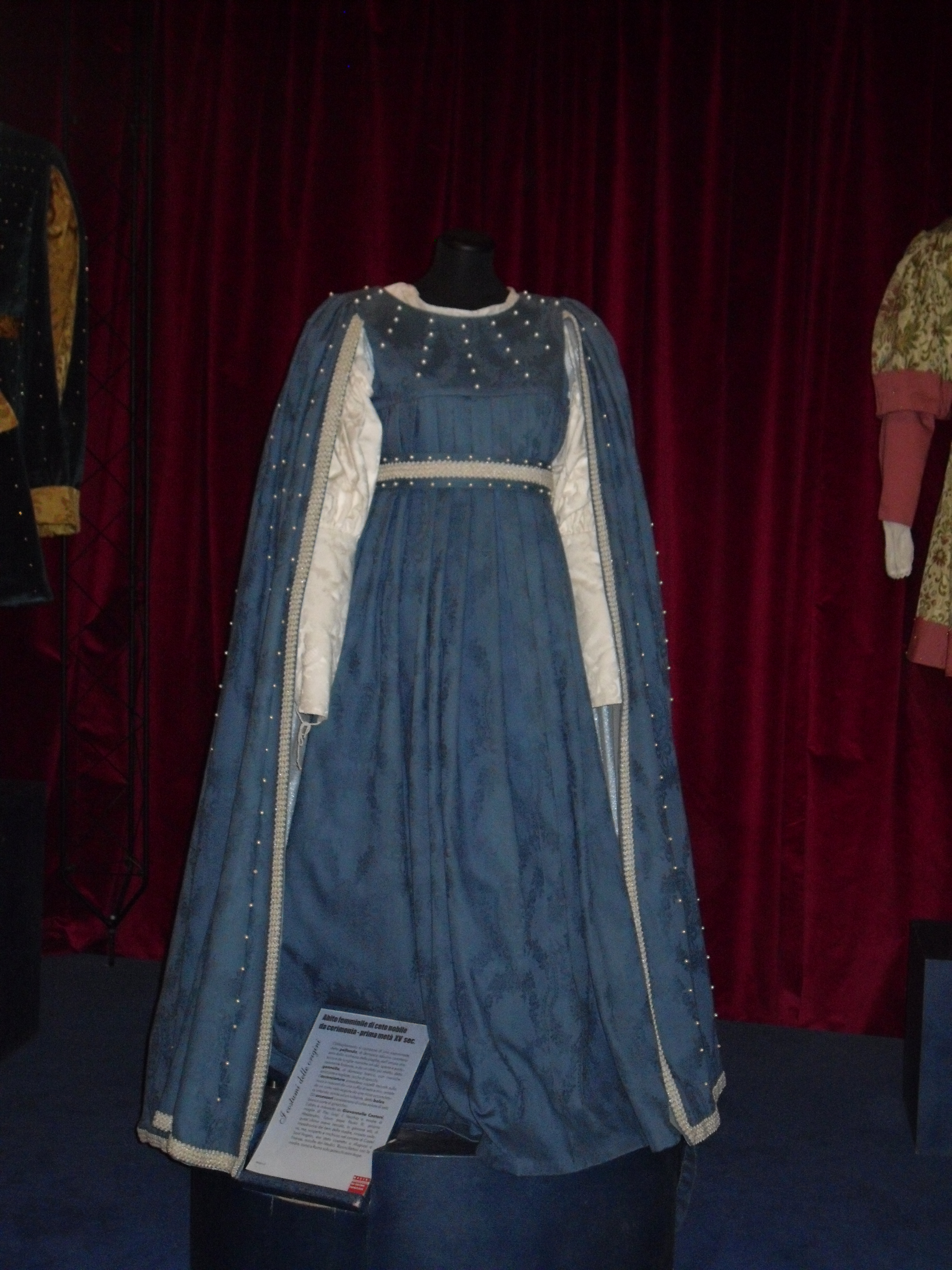
Female dress on first room

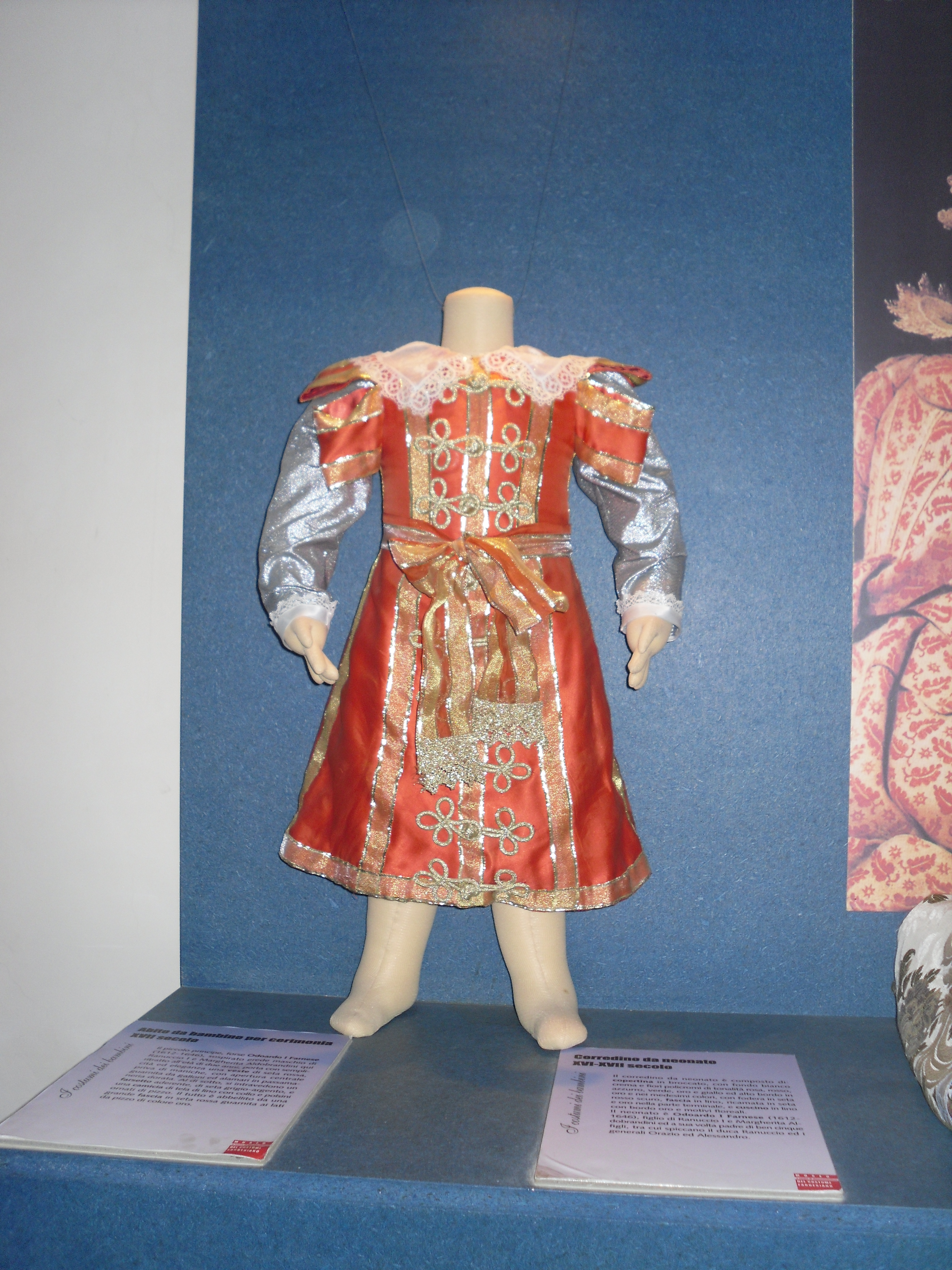
Child's cloth

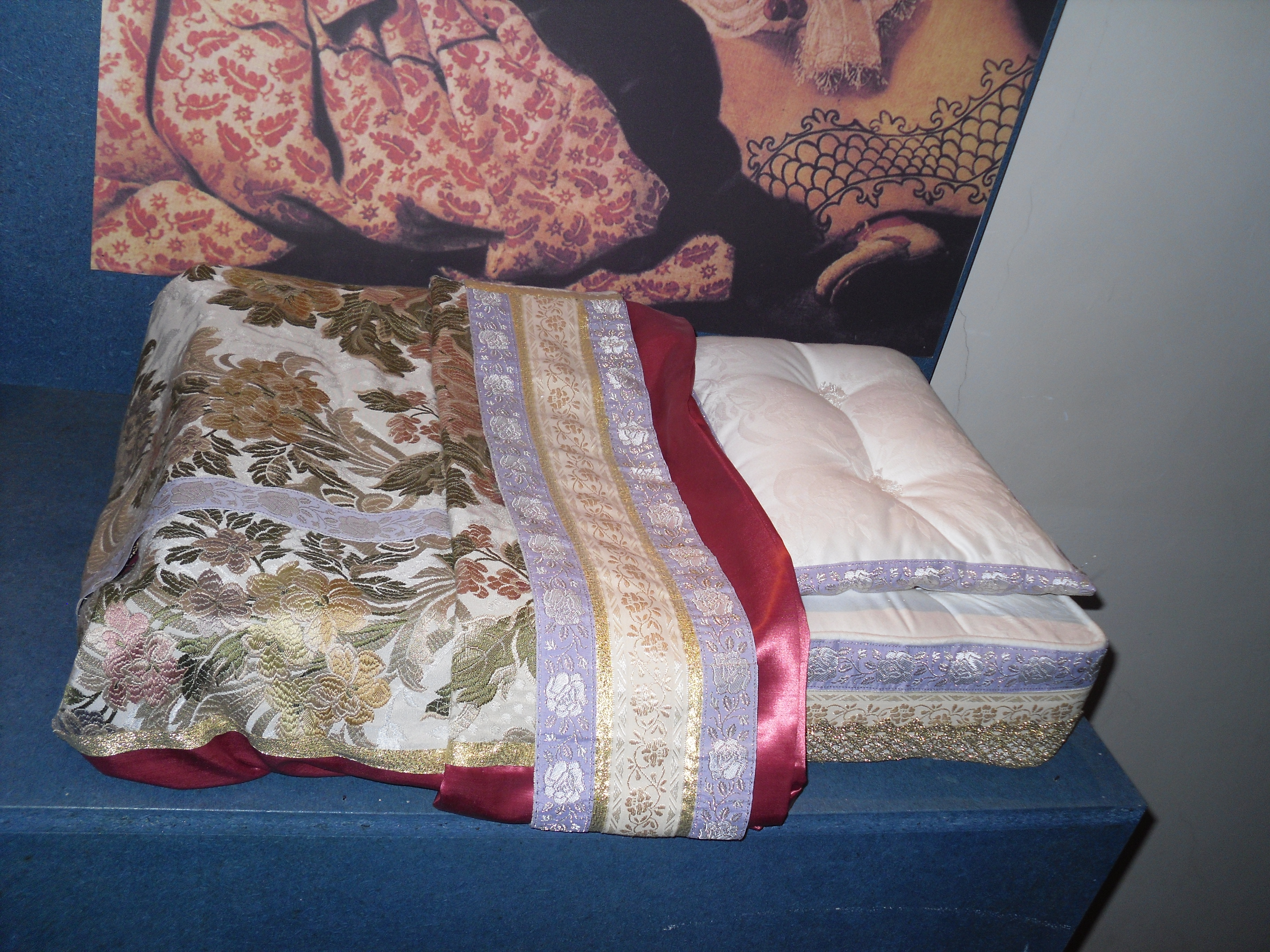
Child's bed

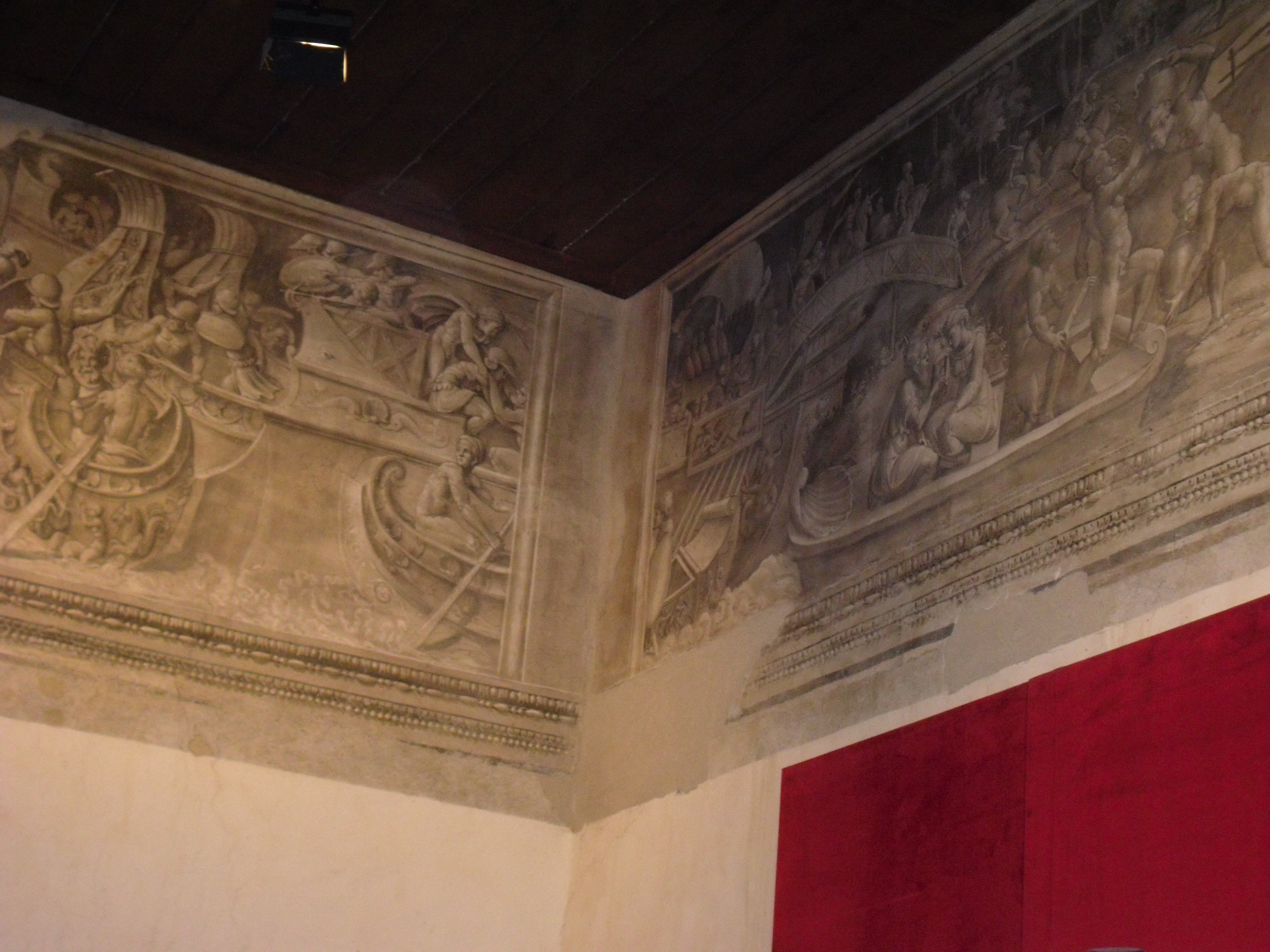
Monochrome third room

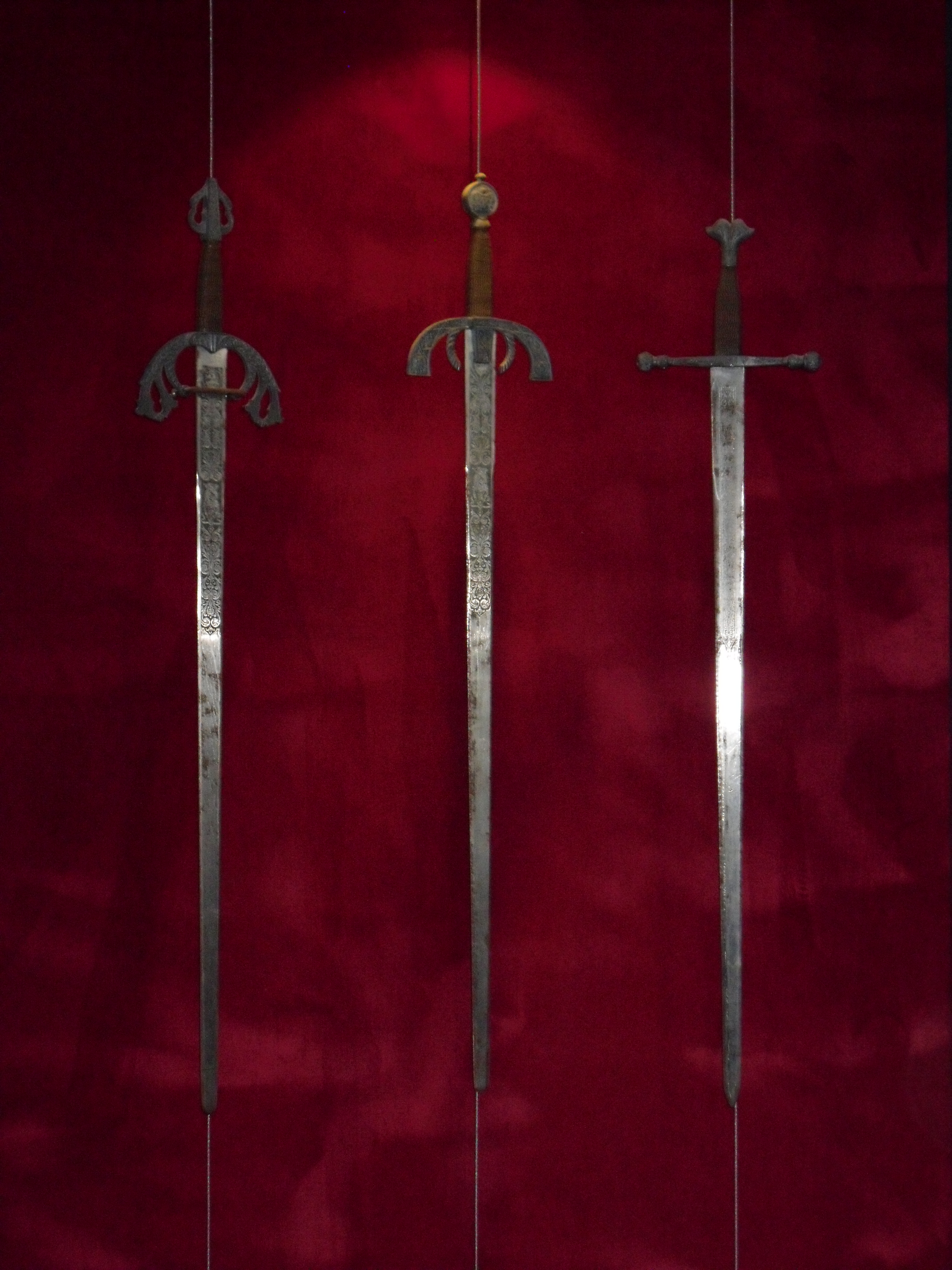
Swords on third room

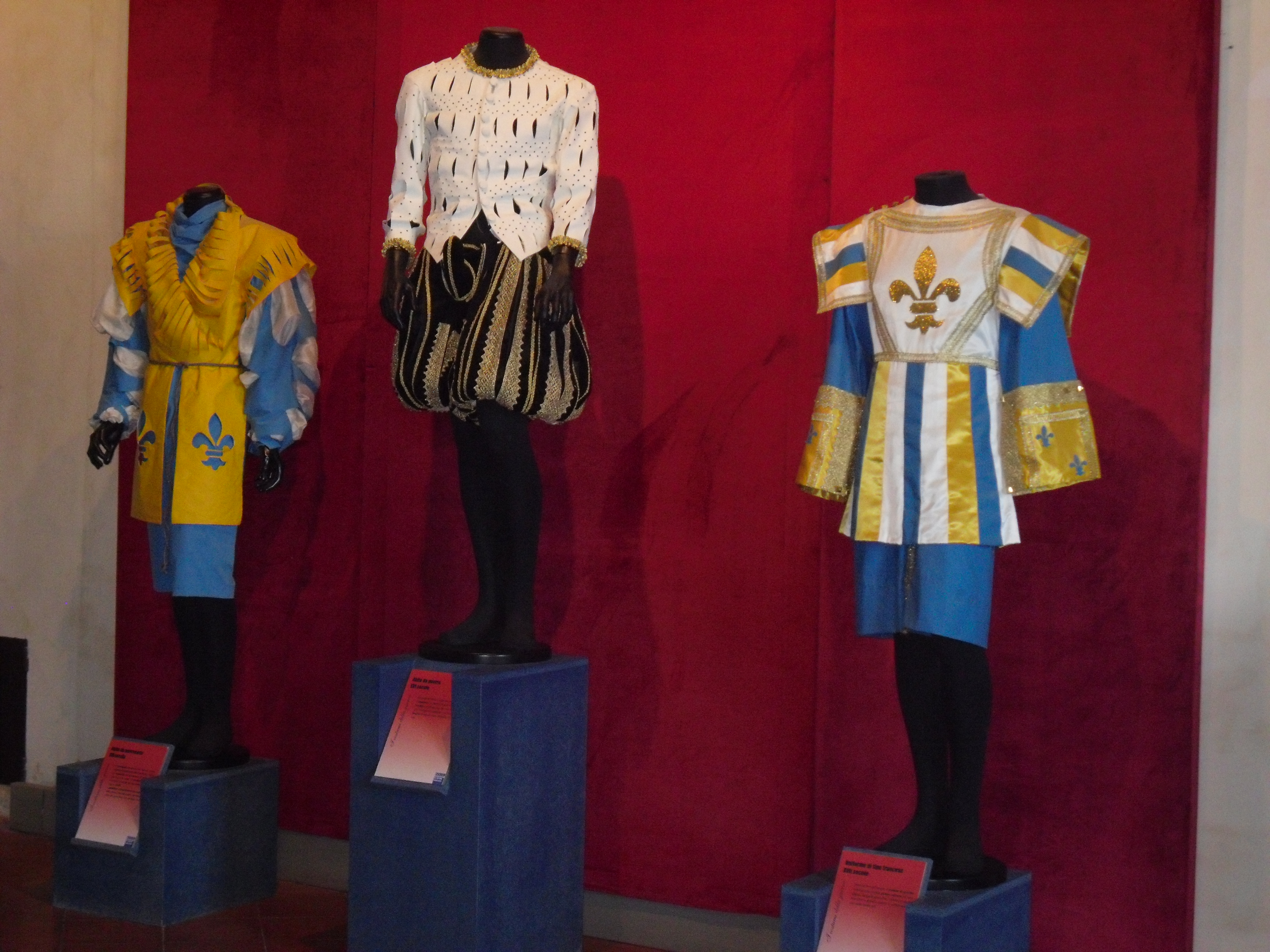
Males cloth on third room

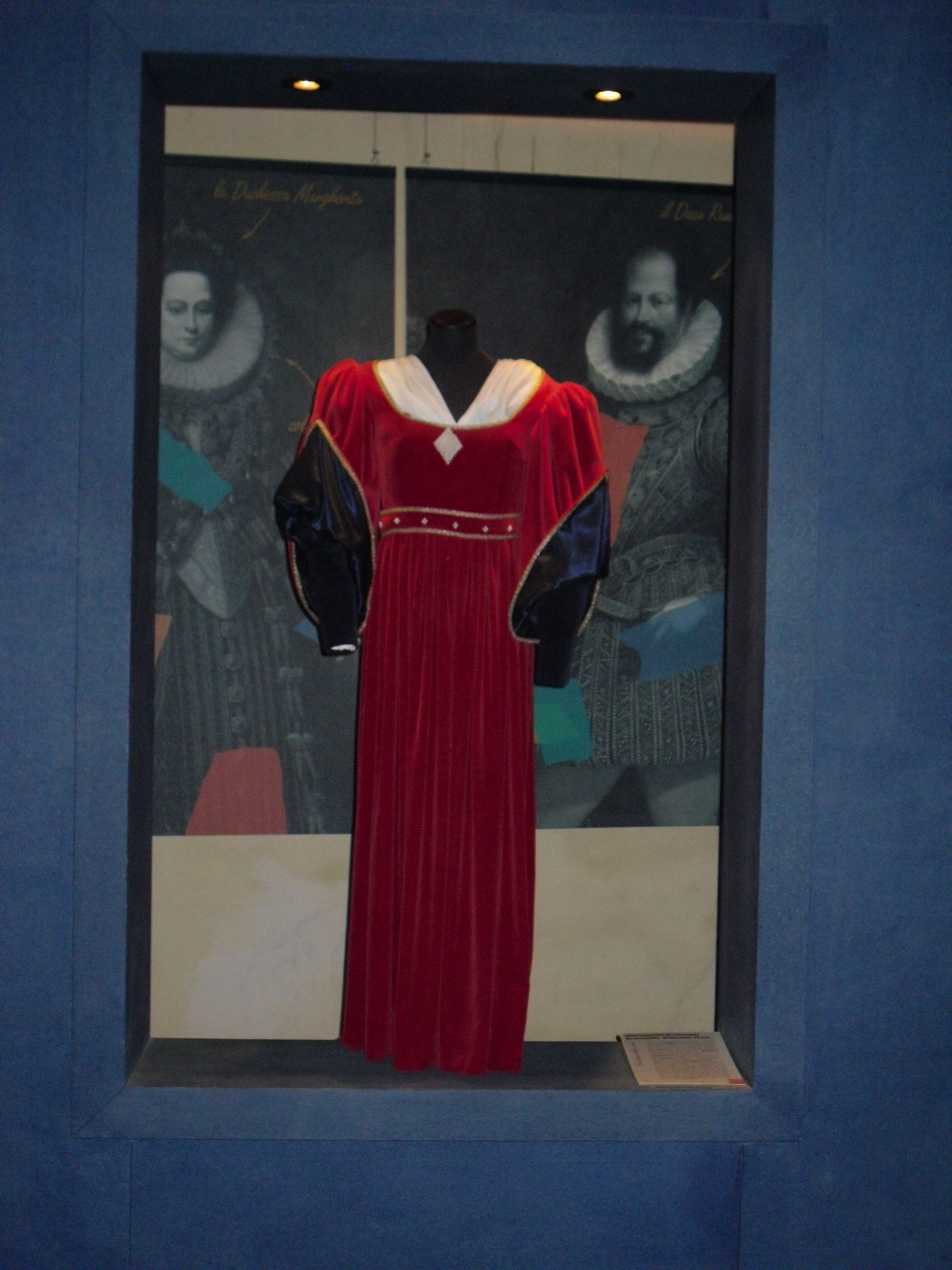
Female dress on fourth room

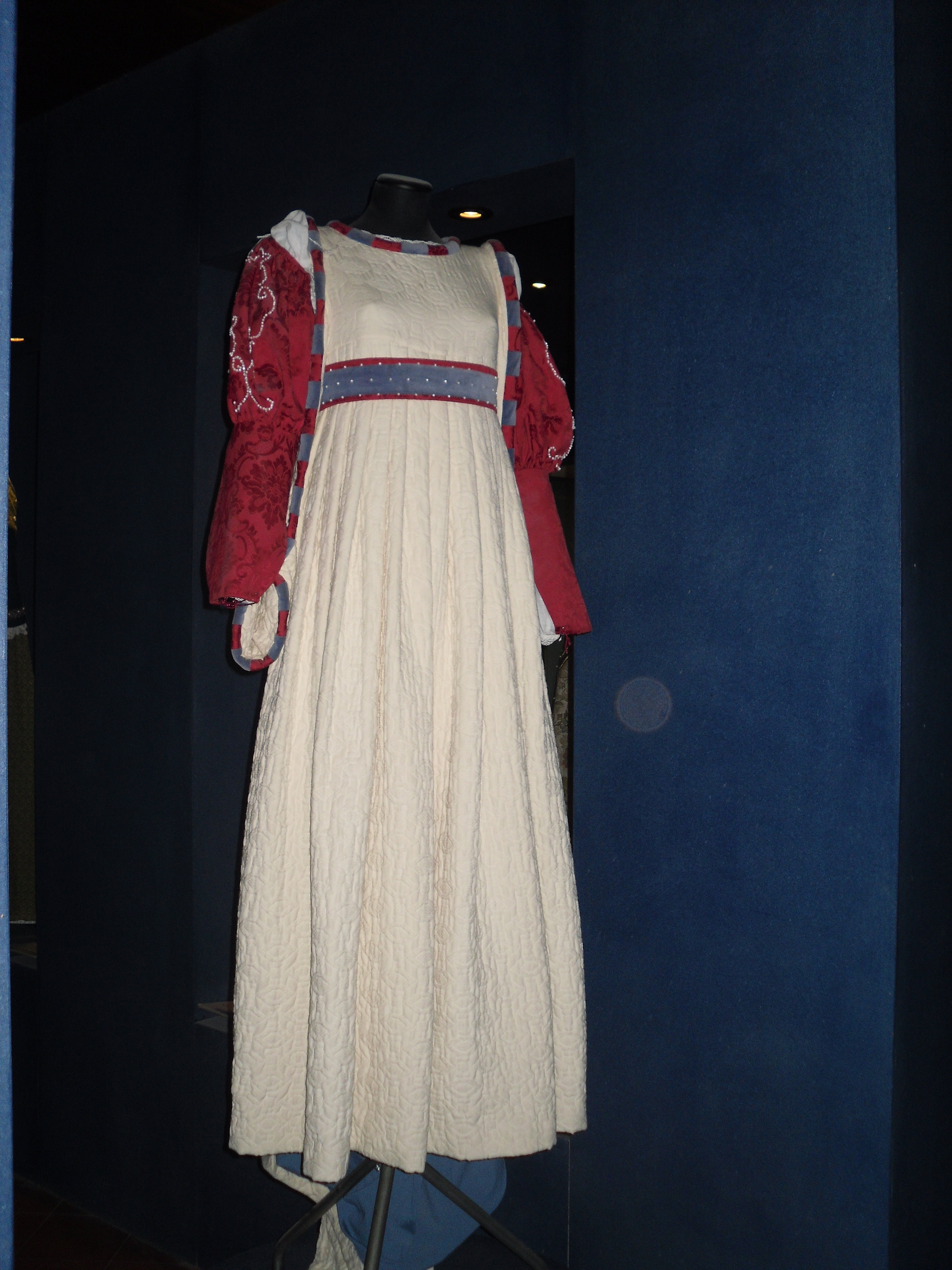
Female dress on fourth room

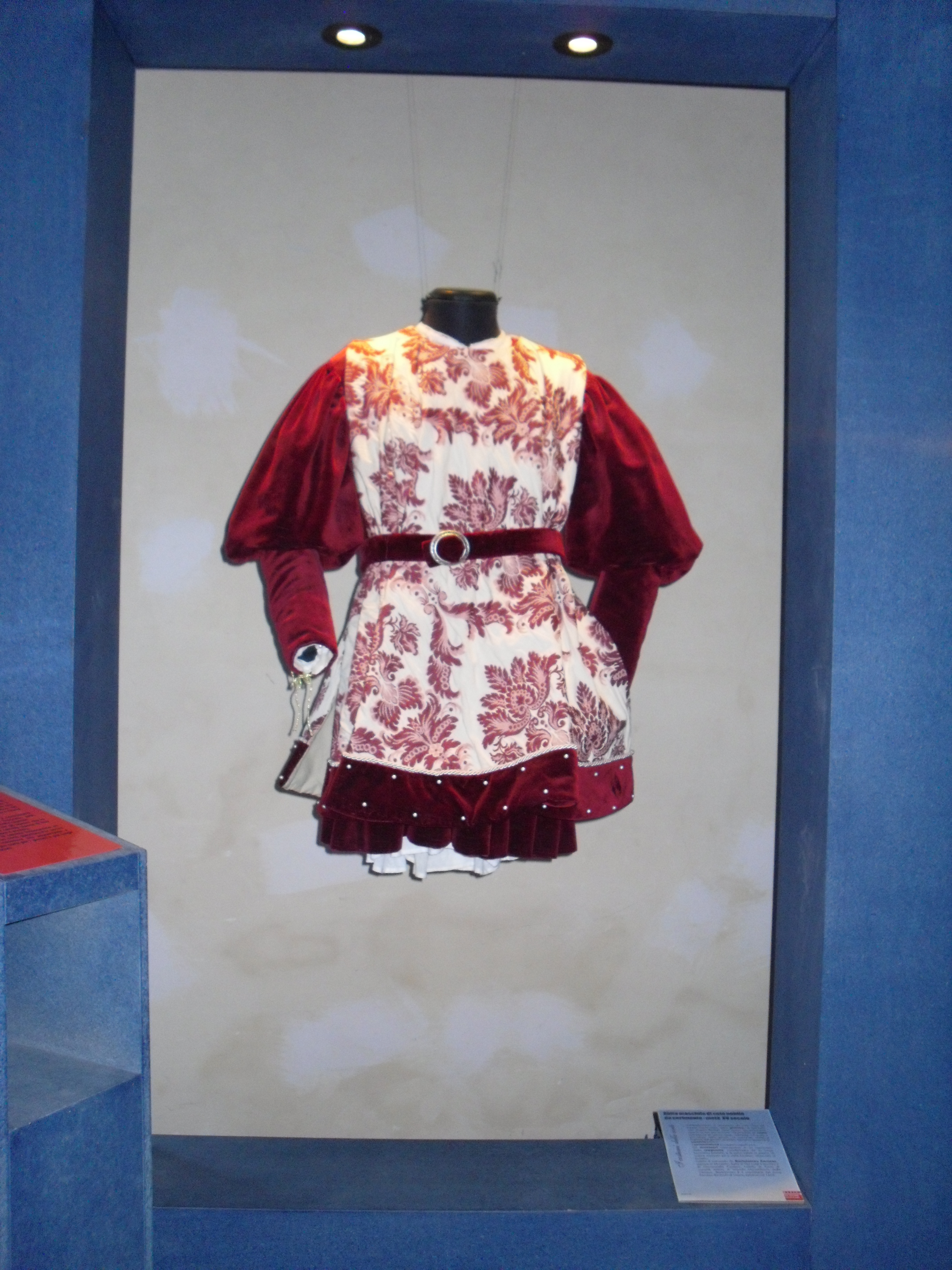
Male cloth fourth romom

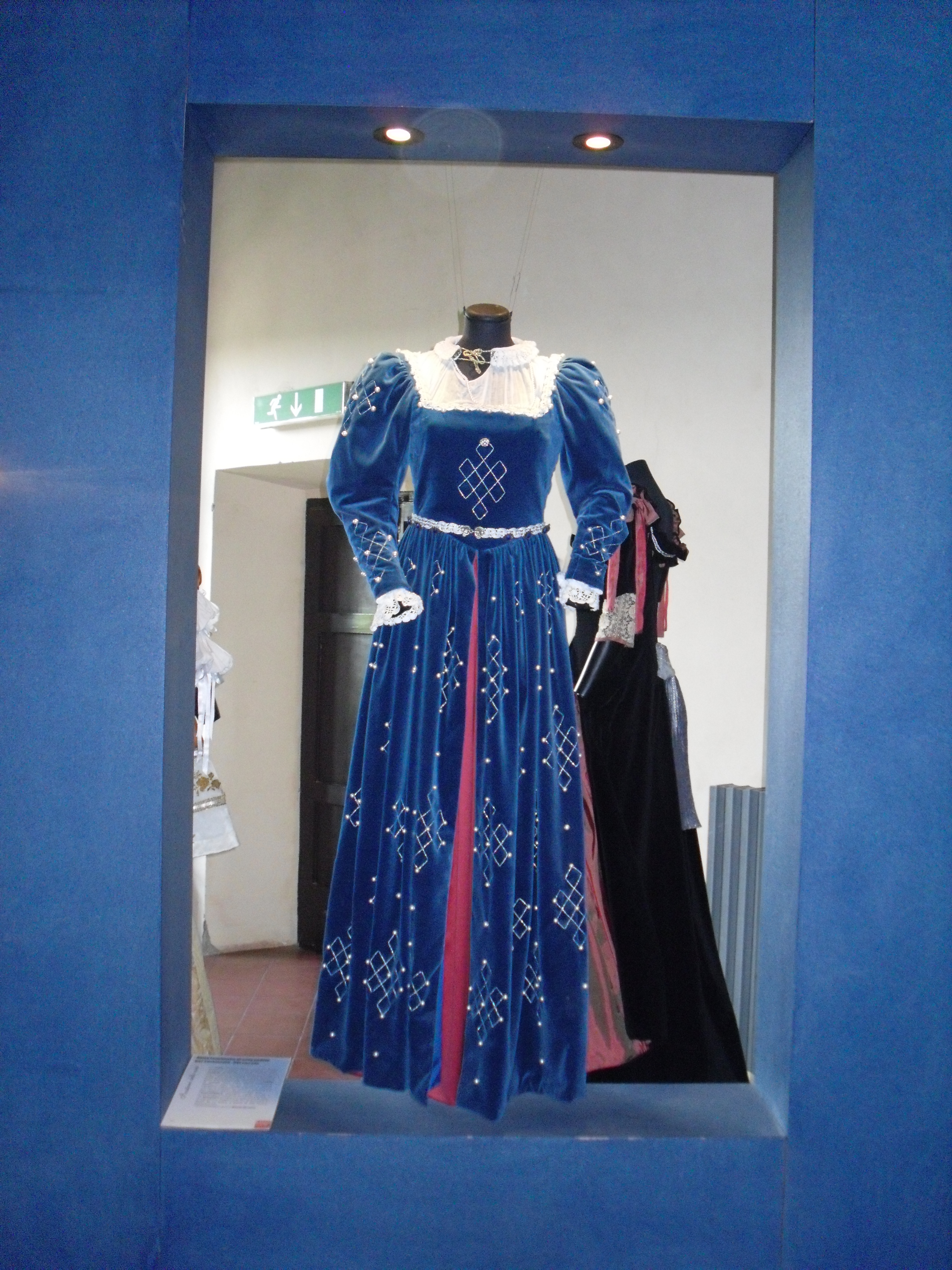
Female dress fourth room

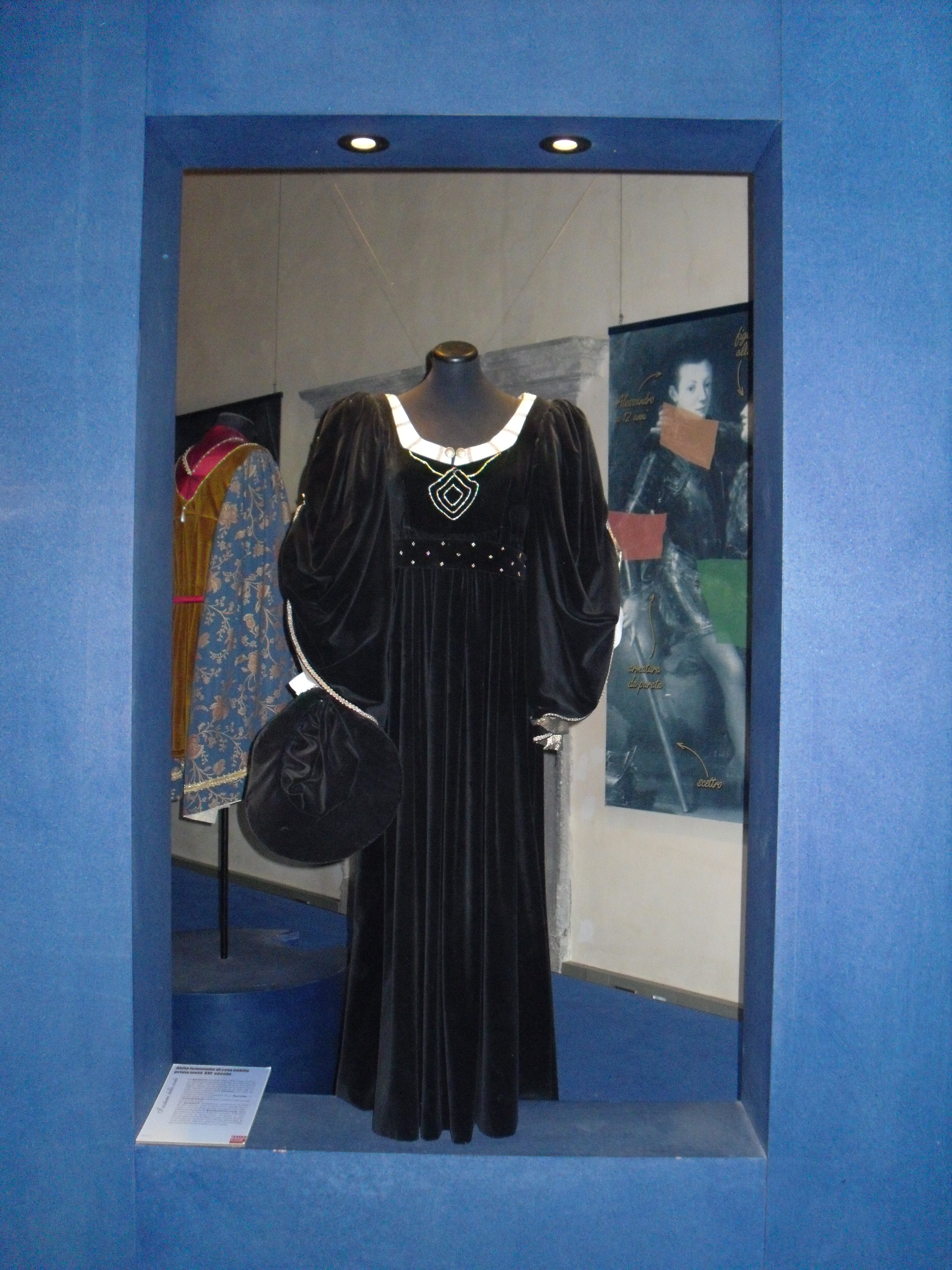
Female dress fourth room

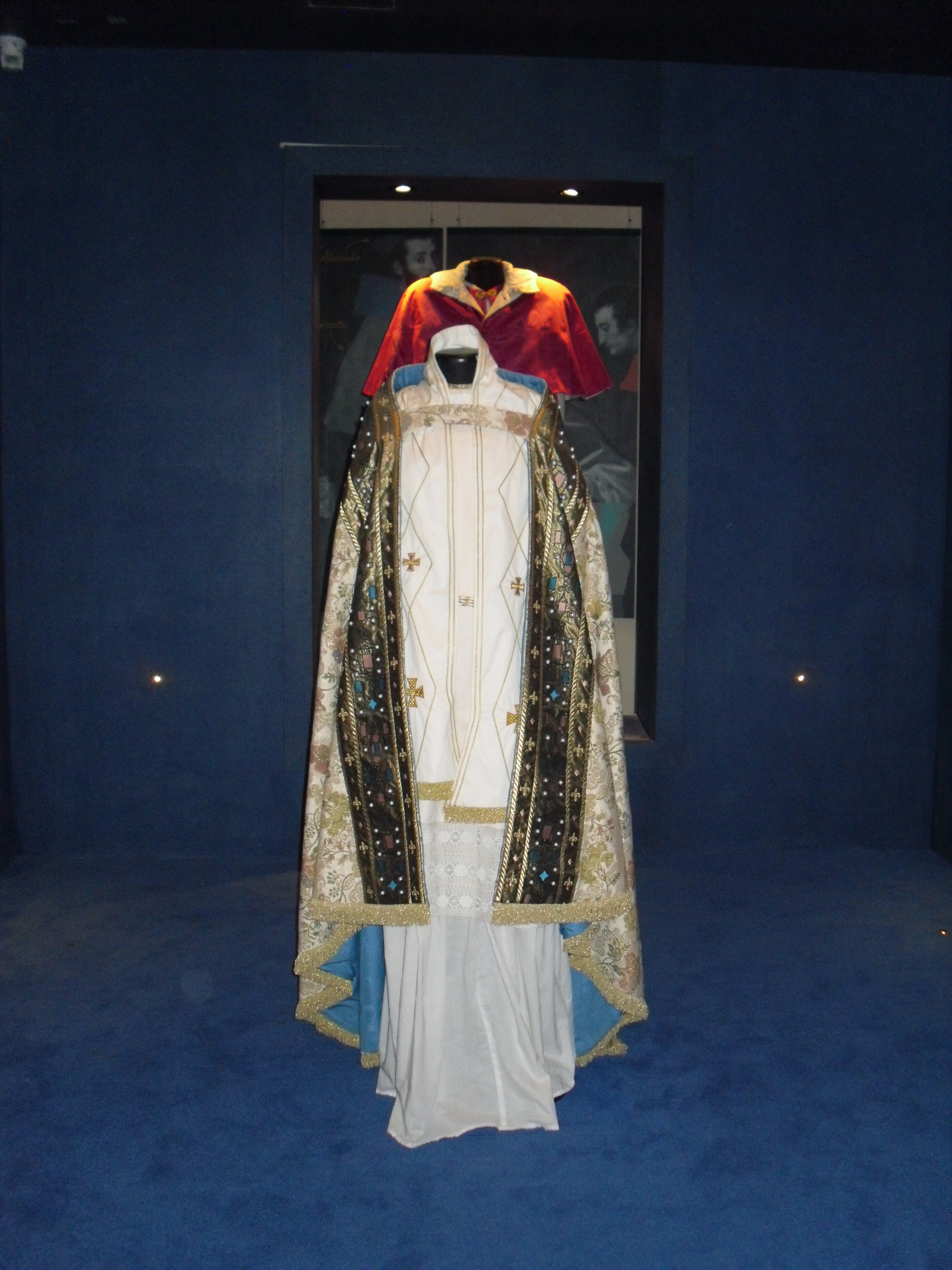
Cloth of Pope Paolo III fourth room

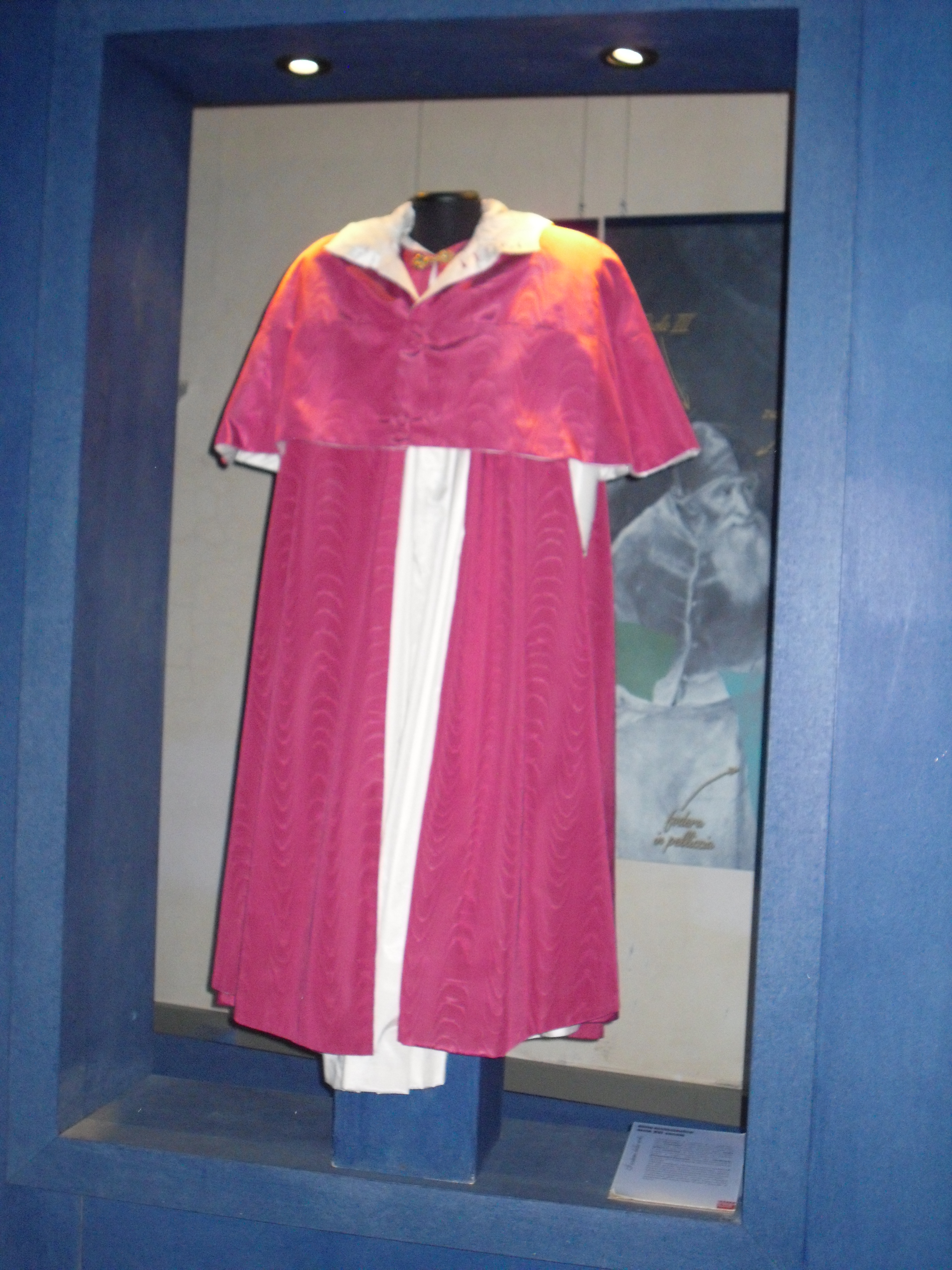
Bishop's cloth on fourth room

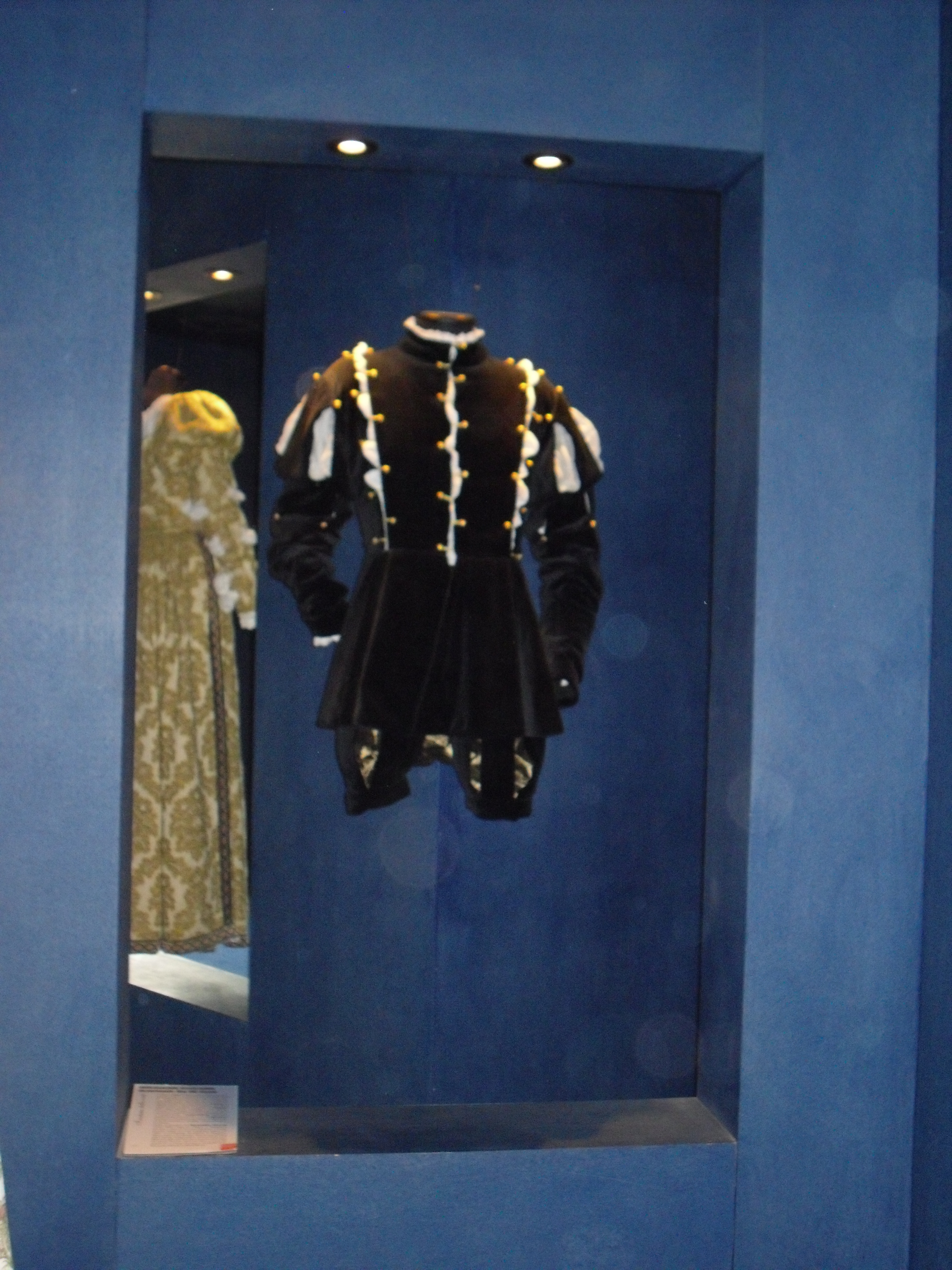
Male cloth fourth room

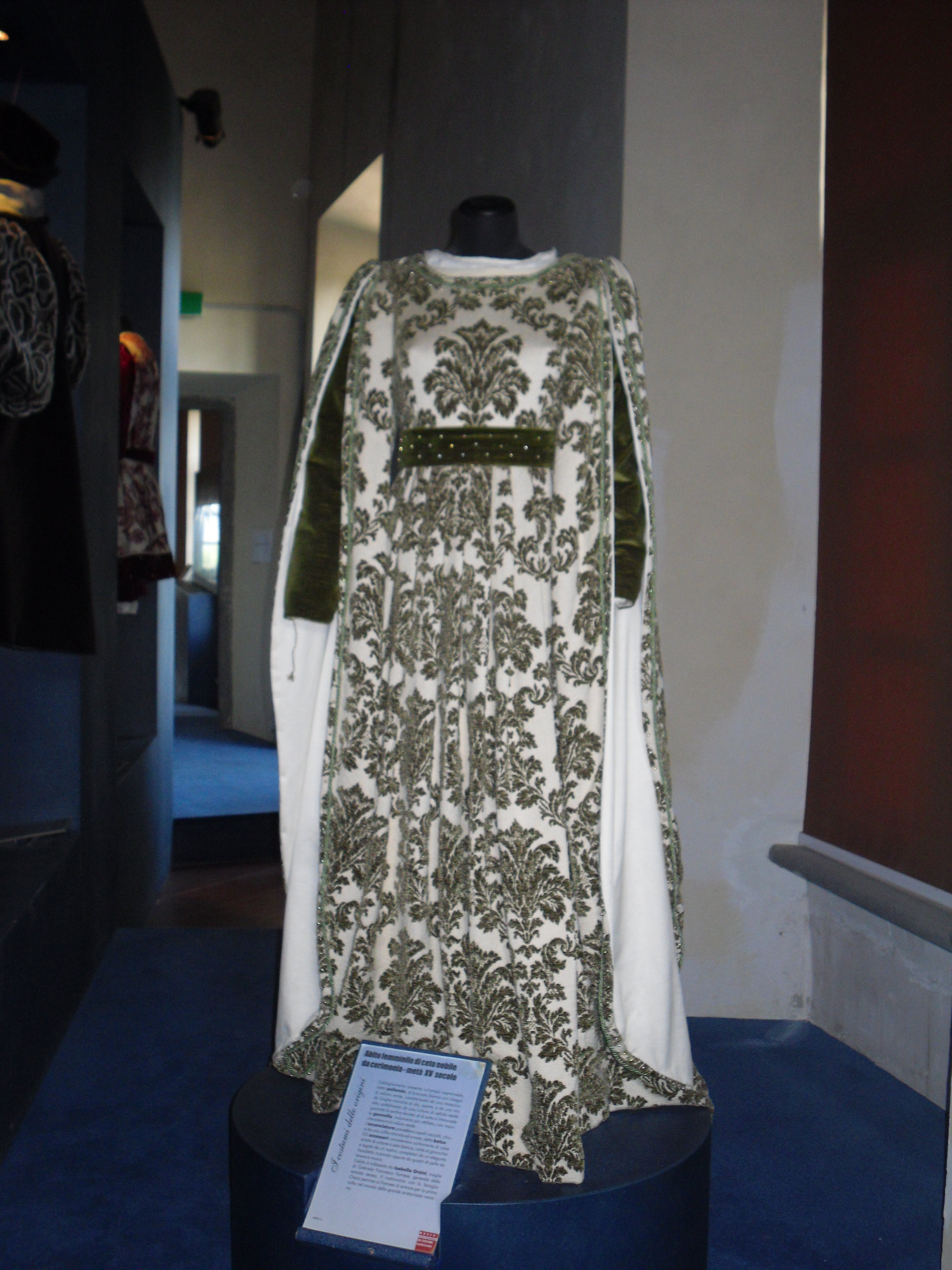
Female dress fourth room

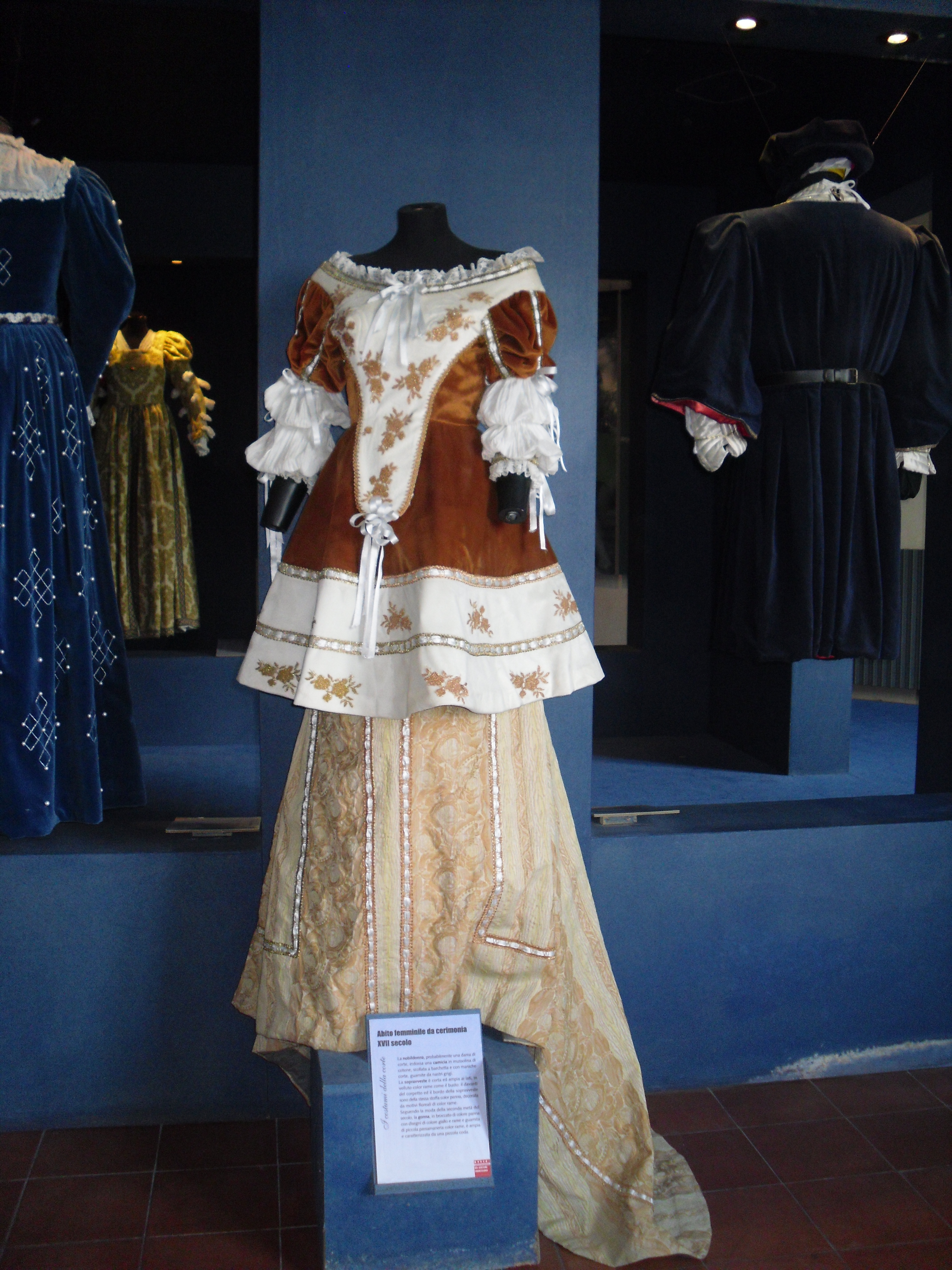
Female dress fourth room

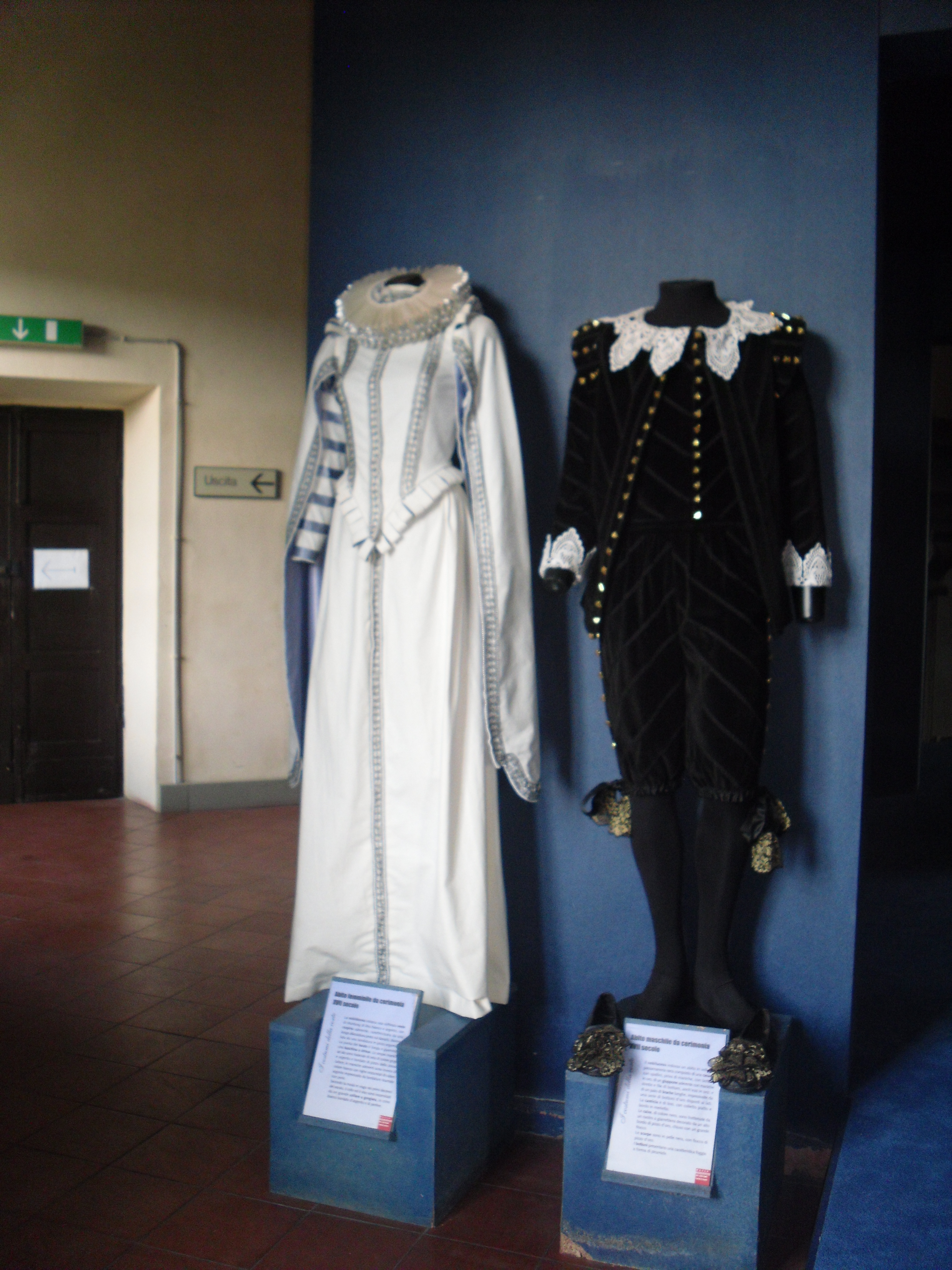
Female and male clothes fourth room

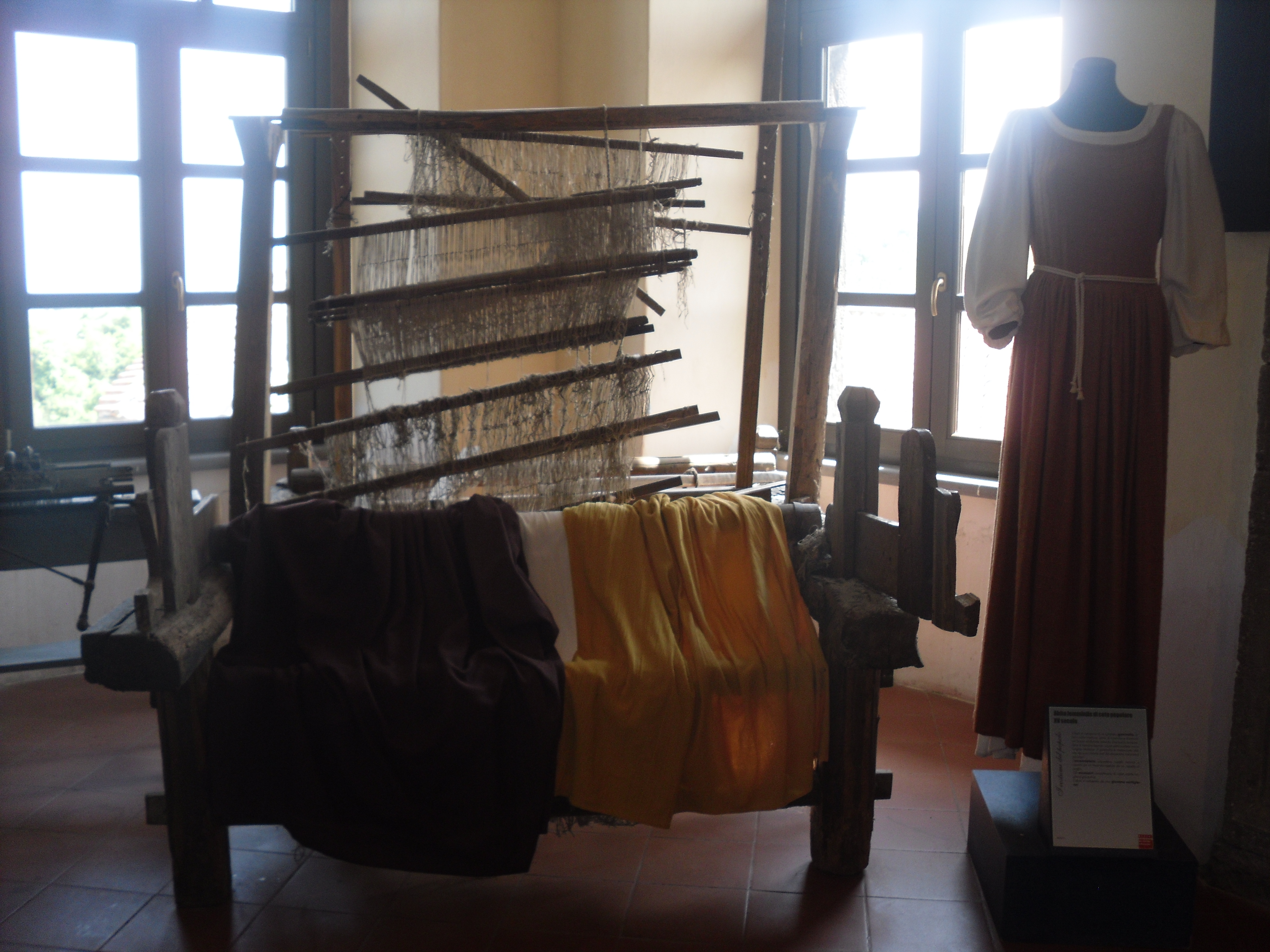
Loom

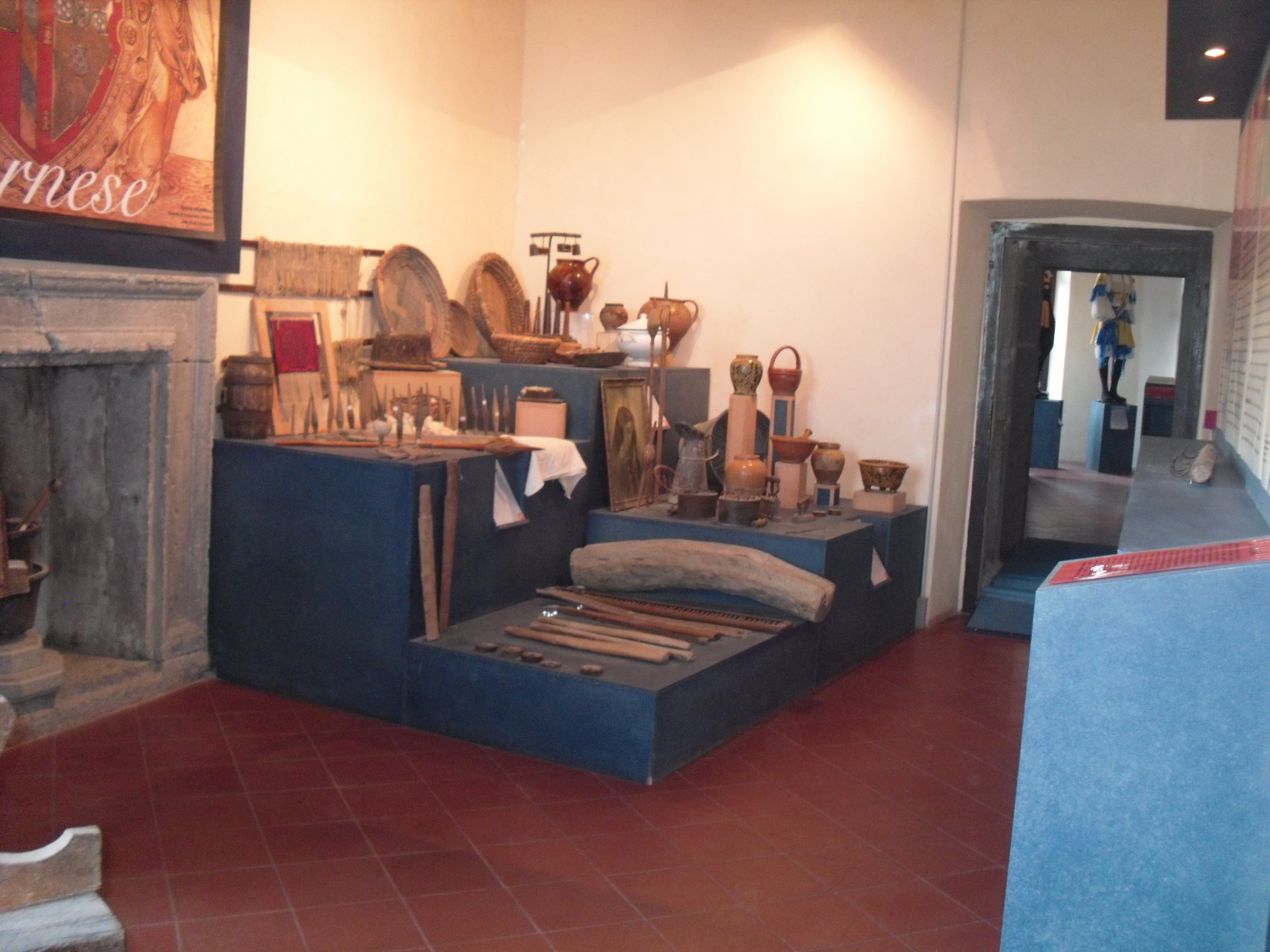
tools for the manufacture of wool and hemp

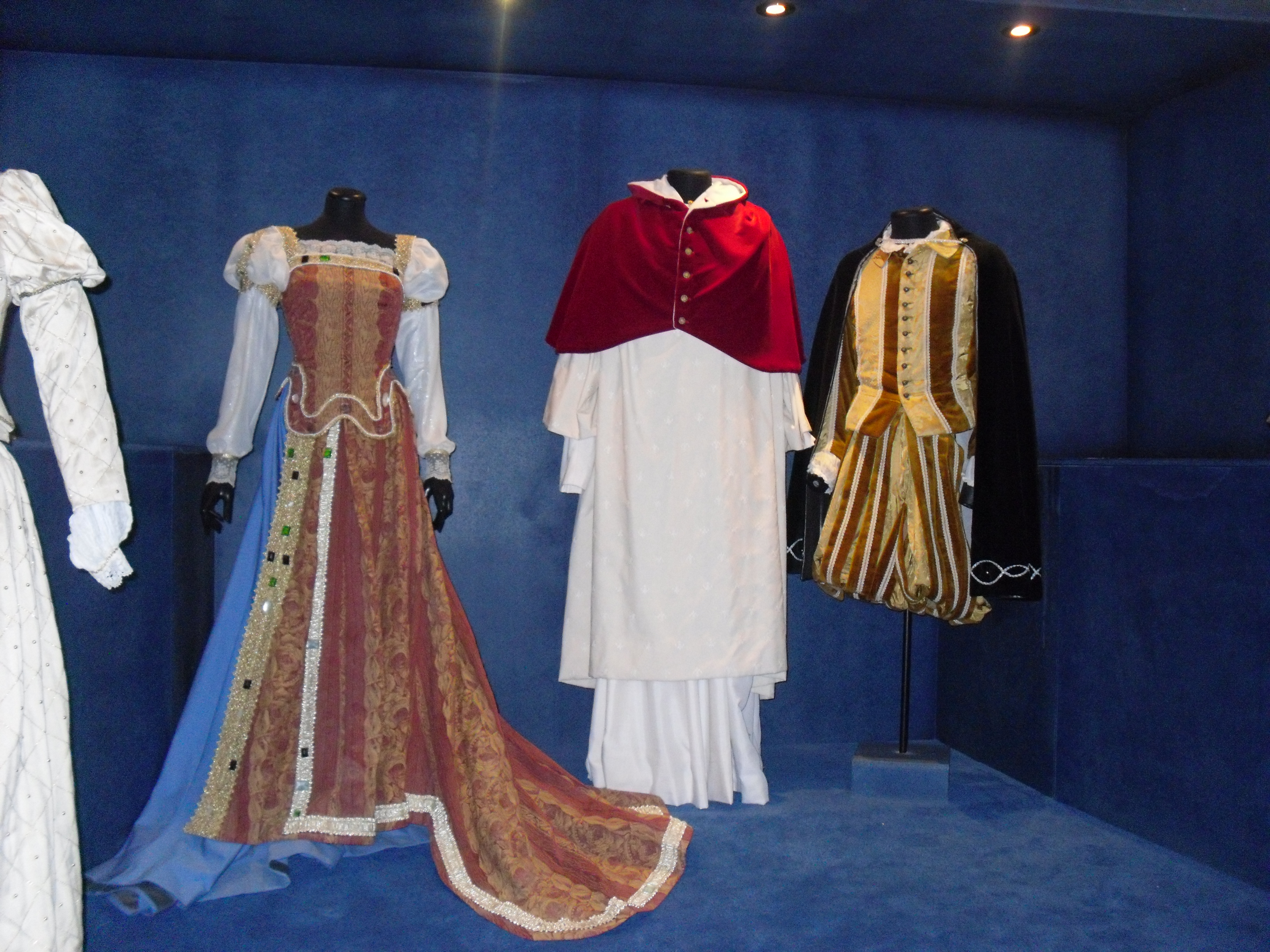
Riproduction scene of marriage sixth room

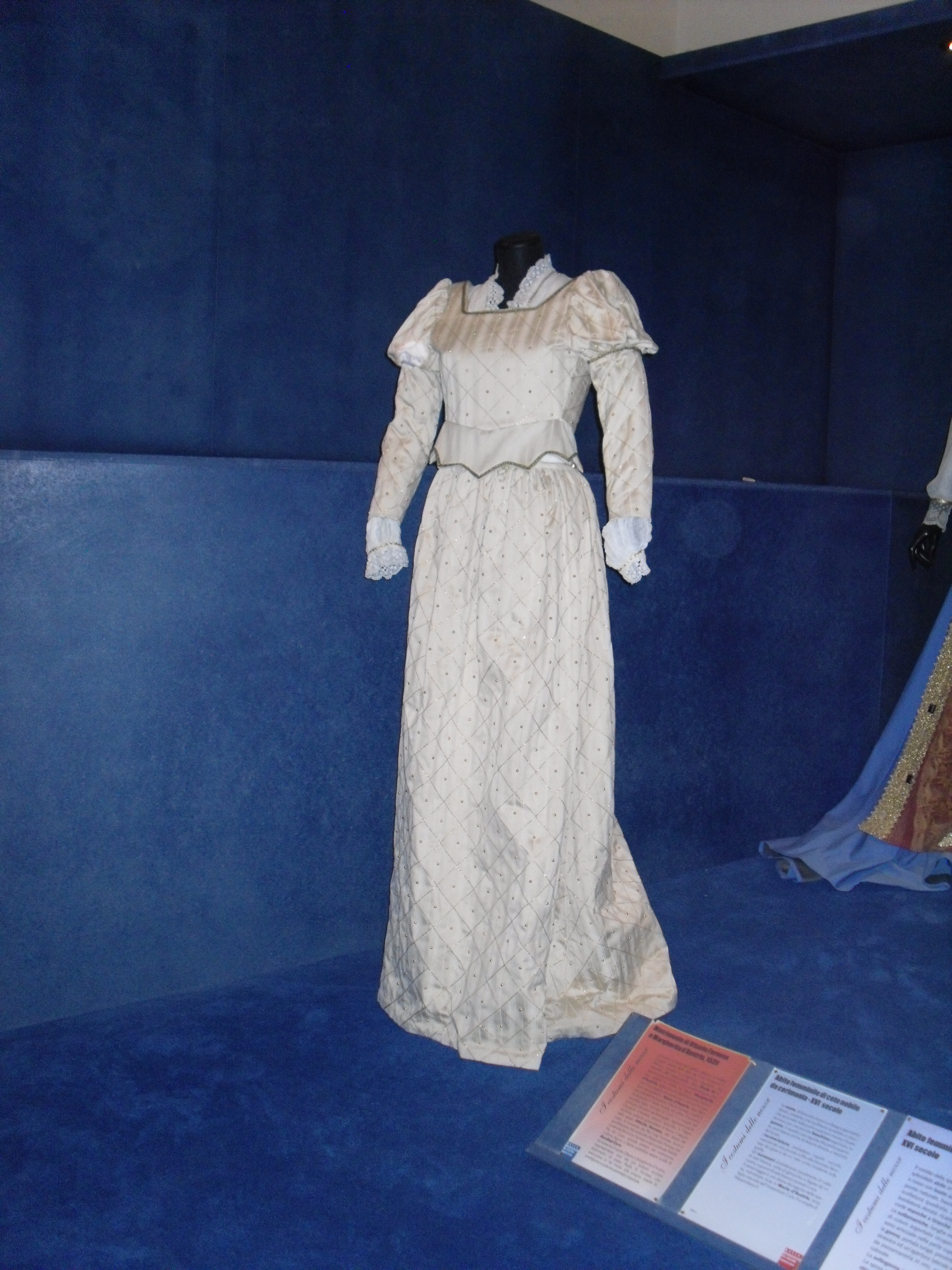
Female dress sixth room

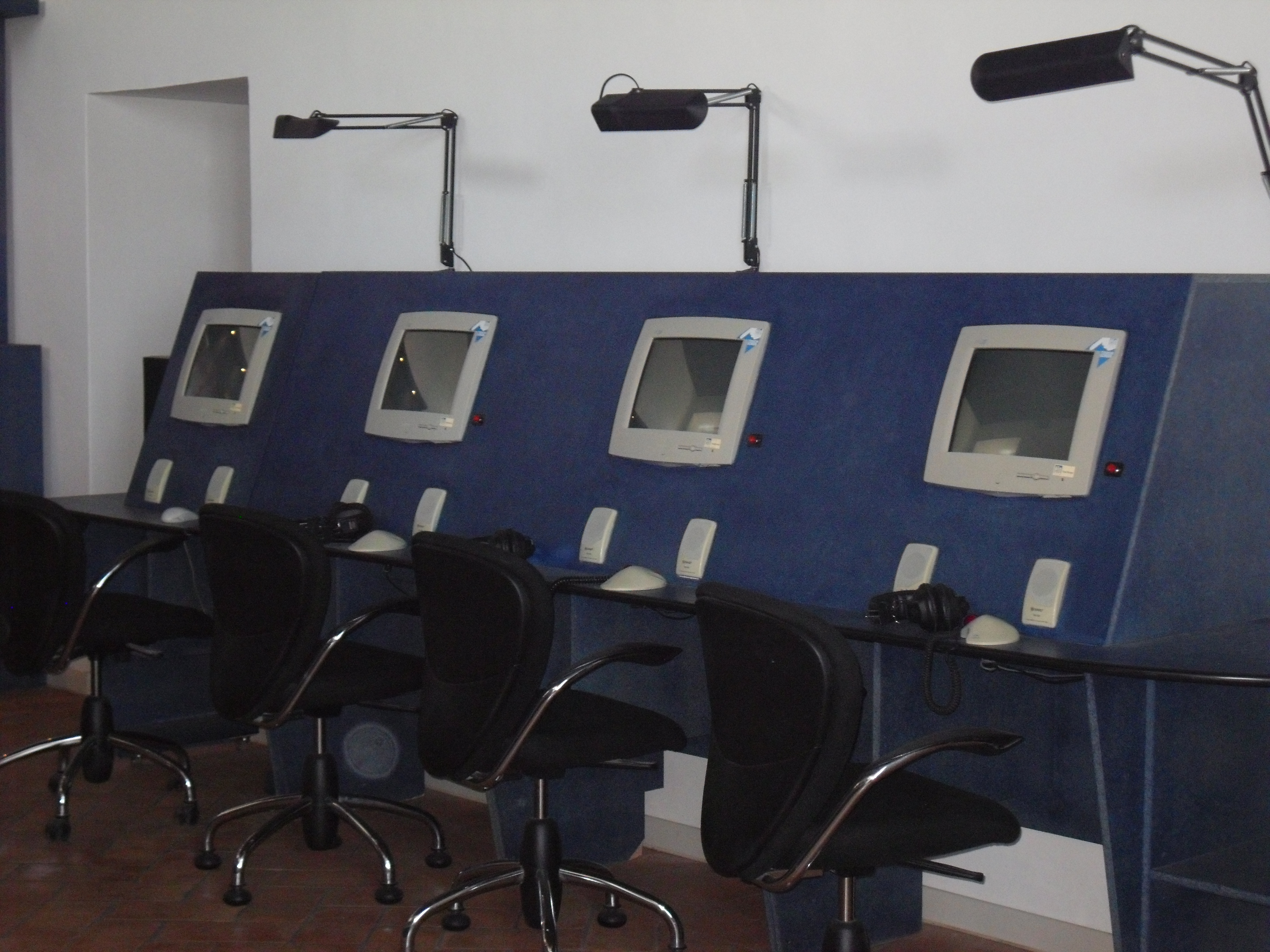
Multimedial room
