= Museum of the History of the Greek Costume =

Greek museum

Coordinates: 37°58′43.8″N 23°44′15.7″E

Museum of the History of the Greek Costume is a special interest museum in Athens, Greece. It was inaugurated by the former Minister of Culture, Melina Mercouri, in 1988 and is part of the Lyceum Club of Greek Women, a non profit society founded in 1911.

The museum's collections include Greek traditional costumes, jewellery, reproductions of minoan, classic and Byzantine clothes, as well as porcelain dolls with Greek costumes.
