= Fashion museum =

Museum specialising in costume, clothing or fashion

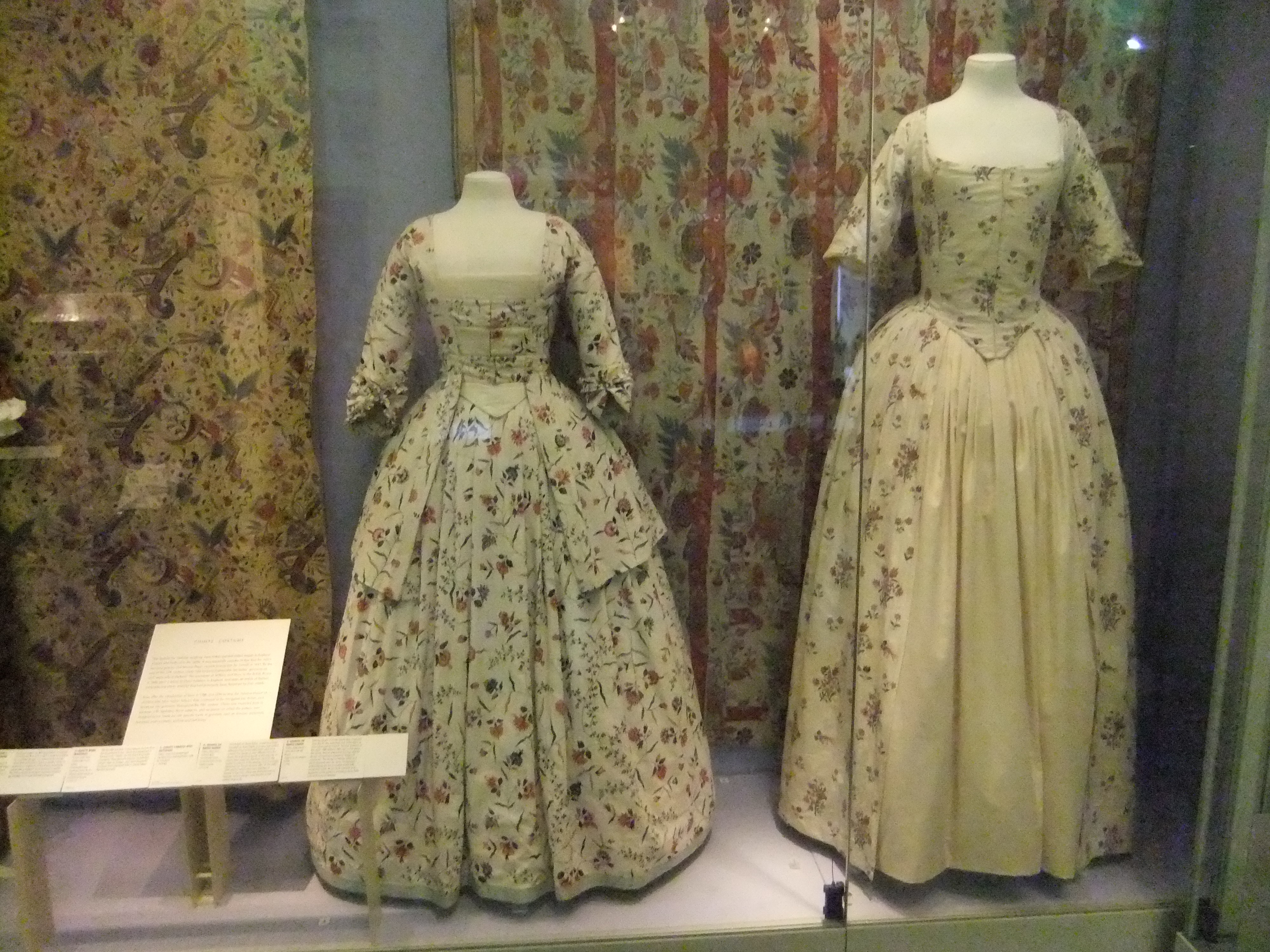
Dresses at the Victoria and Albert Museum in London.

A fashion museum is dedicated to or features a significant collection of accessories or clothing. While there may be some overlap with textile museums, fashion museums focus on what trends in clothing and accessories reveal about the larger cultural, social, and economic values of different historical periods. Although fashion is a broad term that applies to more than just clothing items, these provide tangible examples of trends changing over the years which explains why the term fashion museum is most commonly referring to those featuring clothes.

Notable examples include the Costume Museum of Canada, the Fashion Museum, Bath, the Musée Galliera in Paris, the Fashion and Textile Museum in London, and MoMu - Fashion Museum Antwerp. National museums with significant fashion collections include the Victoria and Albert Museum in London. The Metropolitan Museum of Art in New York contains a collection of more than 75,000 costumes and accessories.

== Purpose ==
Fashion museums and exhibits can serve a variety of purposes, depending on the type of exhibit. Many of the more historically-focused exhibits choose to use clothing as a way to enhance understanding of a certain time period and paint a more complete picture for visitors. Both historical and contemporary fashion exhibits can show trends and styles of the time and what this means paired with other factors, as well as providing inspiration for fashion designers and other artists. Museums and exhibits focusing on specific designers can also be used as a form of "slow marketing", garnering more publicity and recognition for a specific brand. Perhaps most importantly, the current popularity of fashion and fashion exhibits can boost engagement with museums and draw in a higher number of visitors, ultimately benefiting the museum greatly. Fashion museums and exhibits have become one of the main ways for the general public to engage with and understand both contemporary and historical fashion, making these types of exhibits beneficial for visitors and museums alike.

Another less obvious benefit and purpose of a fashion museum and exhibits is their ability to solidify certain cities as fashion capitals of the world. A city like London or New York City that has many museums and exhibits dedicated to fashion will continue to be regarded as a fashion capital because of their large offering of fashion-related experiences. The publicity and excitement that follows a successful fashion exhibit can help maintain a city's reputation as a destination for fashion. Fashion museums can also show how certain fashion cities change over time through the clothes they display.

Finally, another unique purpose of fashion and clothing displayed in museums is the way clothes show wear and imperfections caused by the person wearing the garment. These marks connect visitors to a certain exhibit, or the time period being shown. When fashion and clothes are displayed in a historical context, they are not just showing how people dressed at the time but also revealing clues and details of individual lives through their marks of wear. Memories held within the clothes and personal details like this can be incredibly helpful for understanding history by making it more personal.

== History ==
While clothes have been displayed since the end of the 18th century, the concept of fashion exhibits are new to the 20th century. There are some museums solely dedicated to fashion, but the Victoria and Albert Museum and the Metropolitan Museum of Art were some of the first mainstream museums to add extensive fashion exhibits and collections, proving the relatively newfound appreciation and realization of the importance of clothing in the context of museums. In the 18th and 19th centuries, clothing would be seen in museum collections pertaining to anthropology and cultural history. In more recent years of the 20th century, fashion has come to be appreciated as a fine art, so more and more museums have started to respond to the demand for fashion collections and exhibits.

According to fashion historian Marie Riegels Melchior, the evolution of fashion museums can be divided into three periods: the First Period, Second Period, and Third Period. Each period is distinguished by the way clothing was displayed and understood in museum exhibits and the evolution from period to period shows how peoples' understanding of and appreciation for clothing began to shift.

=== The First Period (1930s - 1960s) ===
The First Period started around the time right before World War II. This is when clothing collections started to be incorporated to museums' main collections. In some of the earliest examples of fashion and clothing being displayed in museums, it was almost always garments worn by historical figures or items that showed how people dressed in different social classes. There was no interest in current clothing or designers in the same way there is today.

=== The Second Period (1960s - 1990s) ===
The Second Period began in the 1960s and 1970s, with a rise in fashion's popularity. After World War II, many fashion capitals were changing and affected by the war, like London for example, and as a result, the use of fashion and clothing in museums began to change as well. Fashion made its way into popular culture and became something that more people were interested in, which created more demand for museums to focus on Haute couture and current fashion, rather than just clothing in a historical context. This shift after World War II saw many collaborations between museums and fashion businesses, leading to a diversification of fashion exhibits. Diana Vreeland is a particularly notable name of this period, as she is known for curating many popular exhibits at the Metropolitan Museum of Art that focused on modern fashion and proved there was an audience for this.

=== The Third Period (1990s - Present) ===
The Third Period started in the 1990s and extends to present day. It characterizes a time where visitors have become much more interested in contemporary fashion and designers and have come to expect this from museums. This new interest in fashion in museums has breathed new life into museums and drawn in more visitors.

== Types of fashion exhibits ==
=== Ethnographic exhibitions ===
These exhibits focus on the historical element of fashion, displaying clothing alongside other artifacts like accessories and jewelry. They can provide a wealth of information for historians, anthropologists, and researchers, but fashion designers will also often draw inspiration from such exhibits.

=== Chronological fashion exhibitions ===
Chronological exhibits show clothing displayed in a timeline which allows viewers to see and understand how clothing trends may have developed over time. Oftentimes, the design of the physical space where the exhibit is displayed will create an orderly flow for visitors to follow.

=== Visual Arts Costume Exhibitions ===
These museums or exhibits feature solely items and costumes used in the performance arts like ballet, opera, theater, or film. Notable collections include the Victoria and Albert Museum with over 3,500 stage costumes and accessories, National Center of Stage Costume, and the Bolshoi Theater Museum's collection with 200,000 pieces including costumes, sketches, and accessories.

=== Interdisciplinary Interactions - Thematic Exhibits ===
Interdisciplinary exhibits attempt to demonstrate the strong relationship between designers and other forms of art or artists that inspire their work, and vice versa. Oftentimes, clothing will be shown alongside pieces from other visual art disciplines so visitors can see the close connection.

=== Period features ===
These are exhibits that focus on a given time period, incorporating clothing as one aspect that shows elements of the time, usually alongside pieces like furniture, paintings, and sculptures, for example.

=== Conceptual art ===
These exhibits focus on a special type of fashion, sometimes known as wearable art or conceptual clothing. The clothing is often more avant-garde. Popular designers known for this type of fashion are Rei Kawakubo, Issey Miyake, and Martin Margiela.

=== Retrospective Exhibitions ===
A retrospective exhibit will focus on one designer or fashion label and show clothing in chronological order over the course of designer's career or a fashion label's beginning to current days. Occasionally, this type of exhibit will also be used to showcase a celebrity or public figure's wardrobe over the span of their career.

=== Designer Museums - Store Museum Exhibitions ===
More recently, some designers have begun to open their own gallery spaces in combination with their stores. Examples like Gucci and Saint Laurent showcase archival designs, sketches, and other materials with an adjoining store space.

=== Sustainable Fashion Exhibitions ===
Also more popular in recent years, these exhibits attempt to highlight concerns about fast-fashion and the sometimes damaging nature of fashion and its trend cycle.

== Notable fashion museums ==
- Victoria and Albert Museum
- Anna Wintour Costume Center
- Costume Museum of Canada
- Fashion Museum, Bath
- Palais Galliera
- Musée Yves Saint Laurent Paris
- ModeMuseum Antwerpen
- Fashion and Textile Museum
