= Costume Museum (Kastoria) =

Costume Museum of Kastoria
- Ενδυματολογικό Μουσείο Καστοριάς
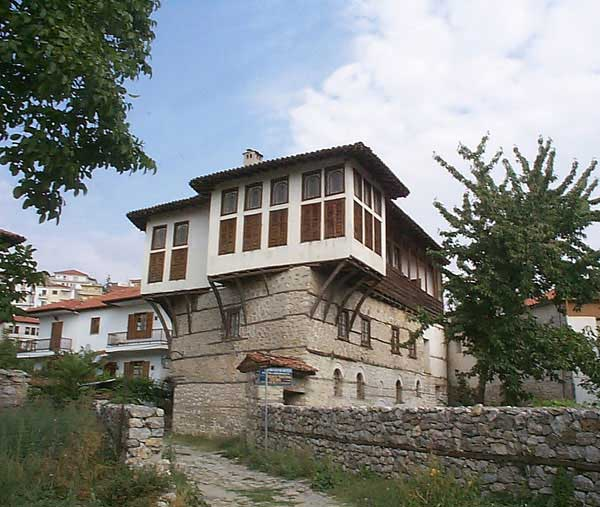
- Outside view
- Established: 1999
- Location: Kastoria, Macedonia, Greece
- Coordinates: 40.5159°N 21.2716°E
- Type: Costume museum

The Costume Museum of Kastoria (Greek: Ενδυματολογικό Μουσείο Καστοριάς) located in the northern Greek city of Kastoria, opened in 1999 and is run by "Harmony", a music and literary association. It is housed in the residence of the Emmanouil brothers, a two-storey building of the 18th century on the edge of Kastoria lake.

== Exhibits ==
The purpose of the museum is to introduce the public to the traditional dress of the Kastoria area, and all the costumes on display come from the city and the surrounding countryside. On the first floor are showcases displaying women's costumes from local villages, such as Nestorio; on the second floor are costumes from the city itself. Specific items include the dzoube, a women's day dress in pale blue; the anderi, a brown-striped women's day dress; formal women's wear of the 18th century in brown; the male anderi without a gilet but with a fez; and a service uniform of silken fabric. Apart from the formal, public attire, there are also men's and women's everyday wear and a variety of accessories, such as stockings, belts, and buckles. There are also children's clothes and fur coats.

== Gallery ==
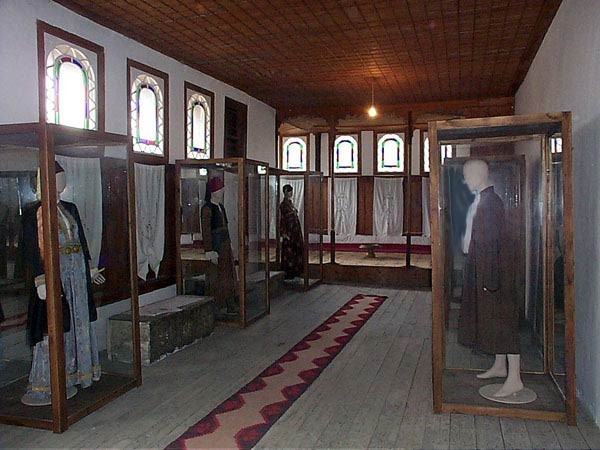
Internal view

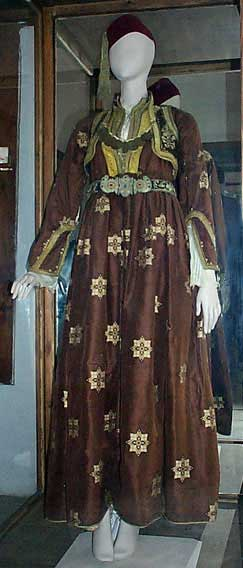
Formal gown

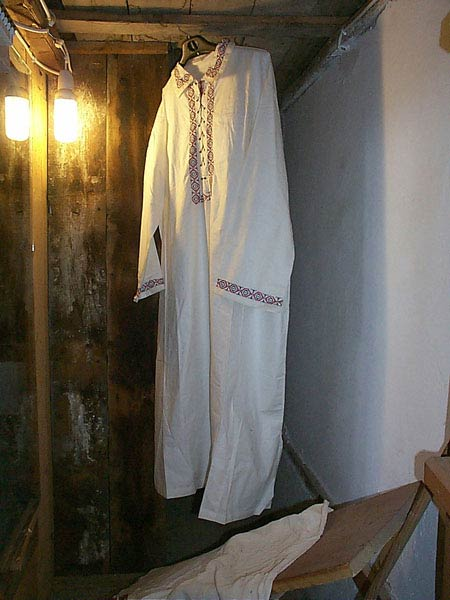
Nightgown

== See also ==
- Costume Museum of Canada
- Centre National du Costume de Scene, France
