= Costume Museum of Canada =

Fashion museum in Manitoba, Canada

- Type: Fashion museum
- Collection size: 35,000
- Website: www.costumemuseumofcanada.com

The Costume Museum of Canada is an institution dedicated to the history of Canadian fashion and clothing. The collection is located in Winnipeg, Manitoba, Canada. The museum gallery space was closed to the public in 2010 but the Costume Museum of Canada continues to offer programs such as: pop-up exhibits, heritage fashion revues, hat shows and other educational programs. The Costume Museum collection holds more than 35,000 textile artifacts reflecting clothing worn over a 400-year period. It was the first textile museum in Canada

== History ==
The Costume Museum absorbed 2,000 artifacts of clothing and textiles from the University of Manitoba that was displayed at the Clothing and Textiles Hallway Museum. Initially located in Dugald, Manitoba, in 2007, the Costume Museum moved to Winnipeg with the aim of attracting more visitors.

In March 2010, The Costume Museum of Canada closed its doors to the public. Due to an extreme financial situation that had developed over many years, it was on the edge of bankruptcy.

An entirely new board was elected and was tasked with securing safe storage for the collection which is now housed in the Exchange District of Winnipeg.

== Programs ==
Currently, the board and volunteers continue to operate three programs: Museum in a Suitcase, The Heritage Fashion Review, and traveling exhibits.

Museum in a Suitcase in an educational program available to schools and other organizations. It offers a hands-on interactive experience with history. It comes complete with instructions. The Suitcases are available on a weekly or longer basis.

The Heritage Fashion Review is a fashion show consisting of replicas of items in the museum's collection. It can be booked by organizations, museums, corporations and individuals, for events being held within a reasonable radius of Winnipeg. The emcee and all models are museum volunteers.

Through traveling exhibits, artifacts are made available to other museums in North America. The exhibits range from 3 or 4 items for small environments, to 50 or more for larger established centers. "The Little Black Dress" was on exhibit at the Ruth Funk Center for Textile Arts at Florida Tech in Melbourne FL, from January through April, 2011.

== Affiliations ==
The museum is affiliated with: CMA, CHIN, and Virtual Museum of Canada.

== See also ==
- Centre National du Costume de Scene, Moulins, Allier
- Costume Museum (Kastoria)
