= National Center of Stage Costume =

Museum in Moulins, France

Centre National du Costume de Scene (National Center of Stage Costume)
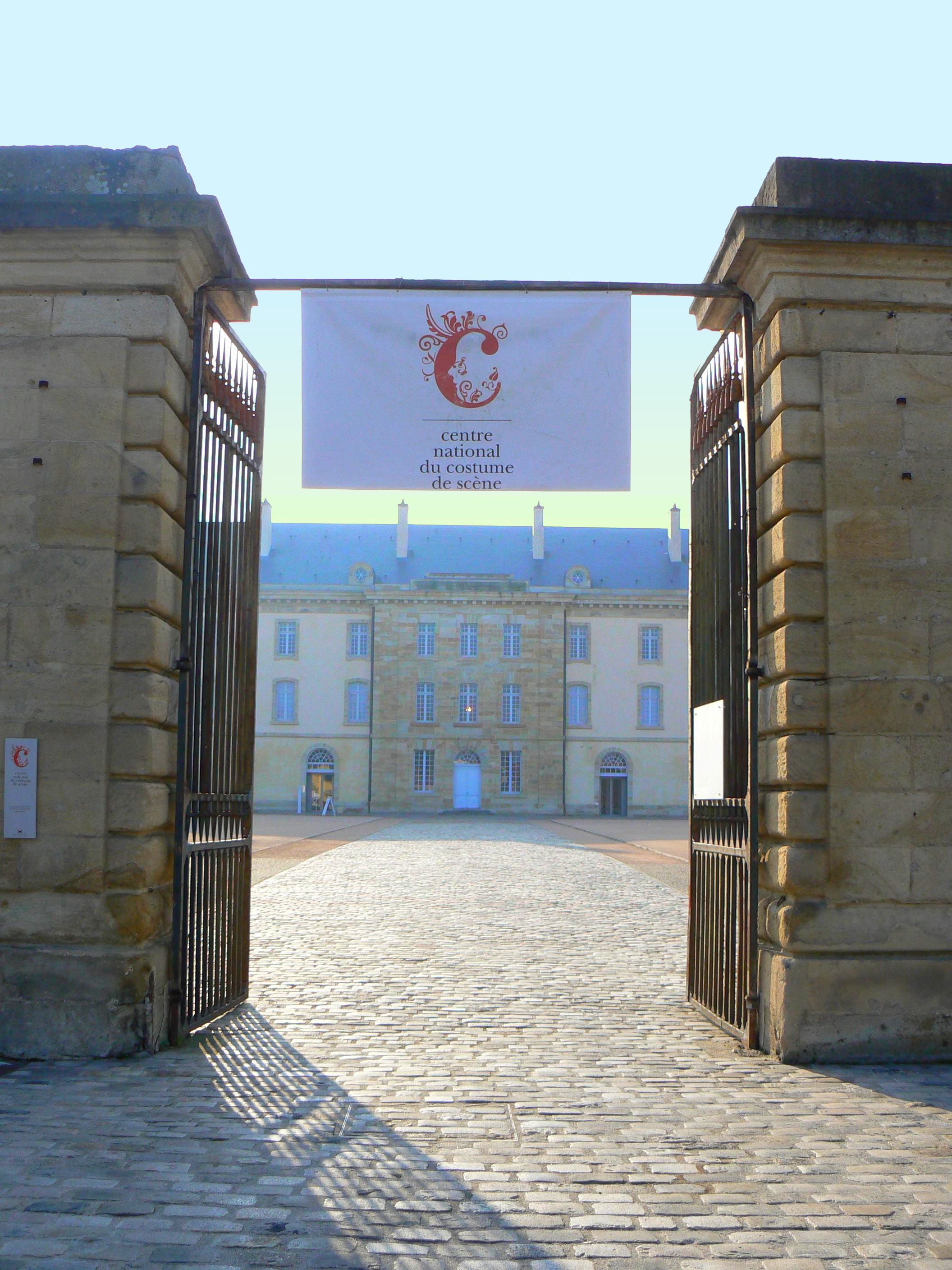
- Established: 2006
- Location: Quartier Villars, Route de Montilly, Moulins, France
- Coordinates: 46°33′40.83″N 3°19′7.13″E
- Collections: Costumes, scenery, paintings
- Website: www.cncs.fr

Centre National du Costume de Scene (CNCS) (English: National Center of Stage Costume (CNCS)) is a French museum dedicated to stage costumes and sets.

It was inaugurated on 1 July 2006 in Moulins, Allier by Renaud Donnedieu de Vabres the Minister of Culture, Pierre-André Périssol the mayor of Moulins and Christian Lacroix, dressmaker and board chairman. The current director is Delphine Pinasa, whose portrait is exhibited at the museum.

== History ==
It is located in the old district of Moulins, Allier Departments of France. Situated on the left side of Allier River, it faces the town and its historic quarter.

The museum includes the historic building, which had been partially destroyed during World War II and was restored by François Voinchet, Architect of Historic Monuments for the museum. Villars, named for the native military officer, Marshal Villars (1653–1734), was built during the reign of Louis XV. The 18th century historical monument was used as a cavalry barracks. The interior of the museum was designed by Jean-Michel Wilmotte and Jacques Brudin. A new 1,730 square metres (18,600 sq ft) building, was built for conservation of the centre's collection.

== Overview ==
The museum is the first structure, in France or abroad, to be entirely dedicated to scenography and costume heritage. Its mission is to preserve, study and increase the value of a collection of 10,000 theatre, opera and ballet costumes. It also shows paintings, on loan from the Bibliothèque Nationale de France (National Library of France), the Comédie-Française and the Opéra de Paris (Paris Opera). (Note: Saatchi states that the collection hold 7,110 costumes, rather than the 10,000 states in the book by Labourdette and Auzias.)

The museum has four areas: the reserves, exhibition halls, library and the training center. There is a gallery of temporary exhibitions 1,500 square metres (16,000 sq ft) behind eight windows. A large room showcases costumes in a scenography context. It also has educational spaces, an auditorium and a documentation center.

Its restaurant was decorated by Christian Lacroix, and it has a museum shop.

== Collections ==
=== Nureyev collection ===
The museum has a collection of Rudolf Nureyev's costumes, as requested in his will to be a "place of memory". Nureyev, who has been the Paris Opera Ballet director had wished to have his collection placed in a museum in Paris, but suitable locations could not be found. So, his collection was placed in the museum in this Auvergne region museum, which is about 3 hours by train from Paris. It is "a permanent collection that offers visitors a sense of his exuberant, vagabond personality and passion for all that was rare and beautiful." The collection has historical artifacts from Nureyev's career including film and photograph material, in addition to 70 costumes.

Nureyev sought a matador look, with a snug-fitting jacket cut short to lengthen his legs. The armhole seam had to be exactly placed so his movements would not be hindered. He favored details that underscored artistic themes. A silver-blue jacket for his Prince Siegfried from the first act of a 1984 Swan Lake echoes the watery locale where the hero meets his true love, with metallic threads flowing over the shoulders like rapids. For Don Quixote, Nureyev preferred a billowing sleeve, as evidenced by a creation from Greek designer Nicholas Georgiadis in rust, wine and gold. The velvet cascades of the women's dresses, trimmed in coins and tassels, hint at the choreography's noisy fury.

— Sarah Kaufman, The Washington Post

It was shown the De Young Museum in San Francisco, California through 17 February 2013 in a show entitled Rudolf Nureyev: A Life in Dance.

=== Stage costumes ===
Several stage companies and theatres, including the Comédie Française and Paris Opera, send their costumes to the museum after their final show. At the museum they are available to be exhibited and preserved. They are also available to researchers and students for study.

== Past exhibitions ==
Previous exhibitions have included:

- Best in Show
- Théodore de Banville
- I love the military
- Christian Lacroix, Costume
- Jean-Paul Gaultier - Régine Chopinot: The Parade
- Thousand and One Nights
- Son in flowers, garden scenes
- Rudolf Nureyev
- Russian operas

== See also ==
- Costume Museum of Canada
- Costume Museum (Kastoria)
