= Palazzo Arcivescovile =

Palazzo Arcivescovile may refer to:

- Archbishop's Palace (Naples)
- Episcopal Palace, Siena
- Palazzo Arcivescovile (Ferrara)
- Palazzo Arcivescovile (L'Aquila)
- Palazzo Arcivescovile (Trento)
