= Basilica of Santa Cristina, Bolsena =

Catholic basilica in Italy

Coordinates: 42.6434°N 11.9895°E

The Basilica of Santa Cristina is a Catholic basilica church in Bolsena, province of Viterbo, region of Lazio, Italy. The church is best known for being the site of a Eucharistic Miracle in 1263, immortalized by The Mass at Bolsena by Raphael in the Vatican palace. It also was the burial site for the martyr and saint Christina of Bolsena.

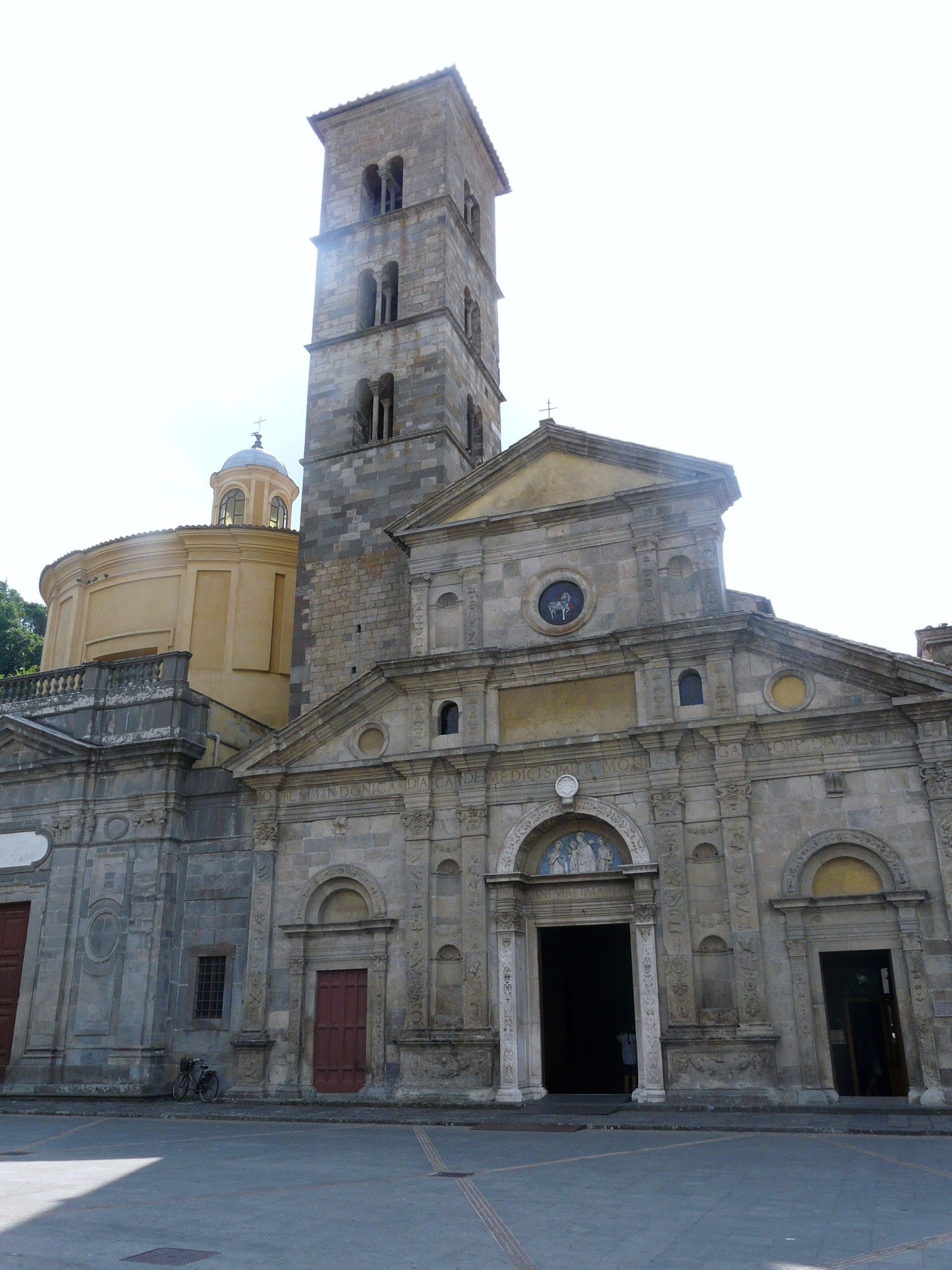
Renaissance façade

== History ==
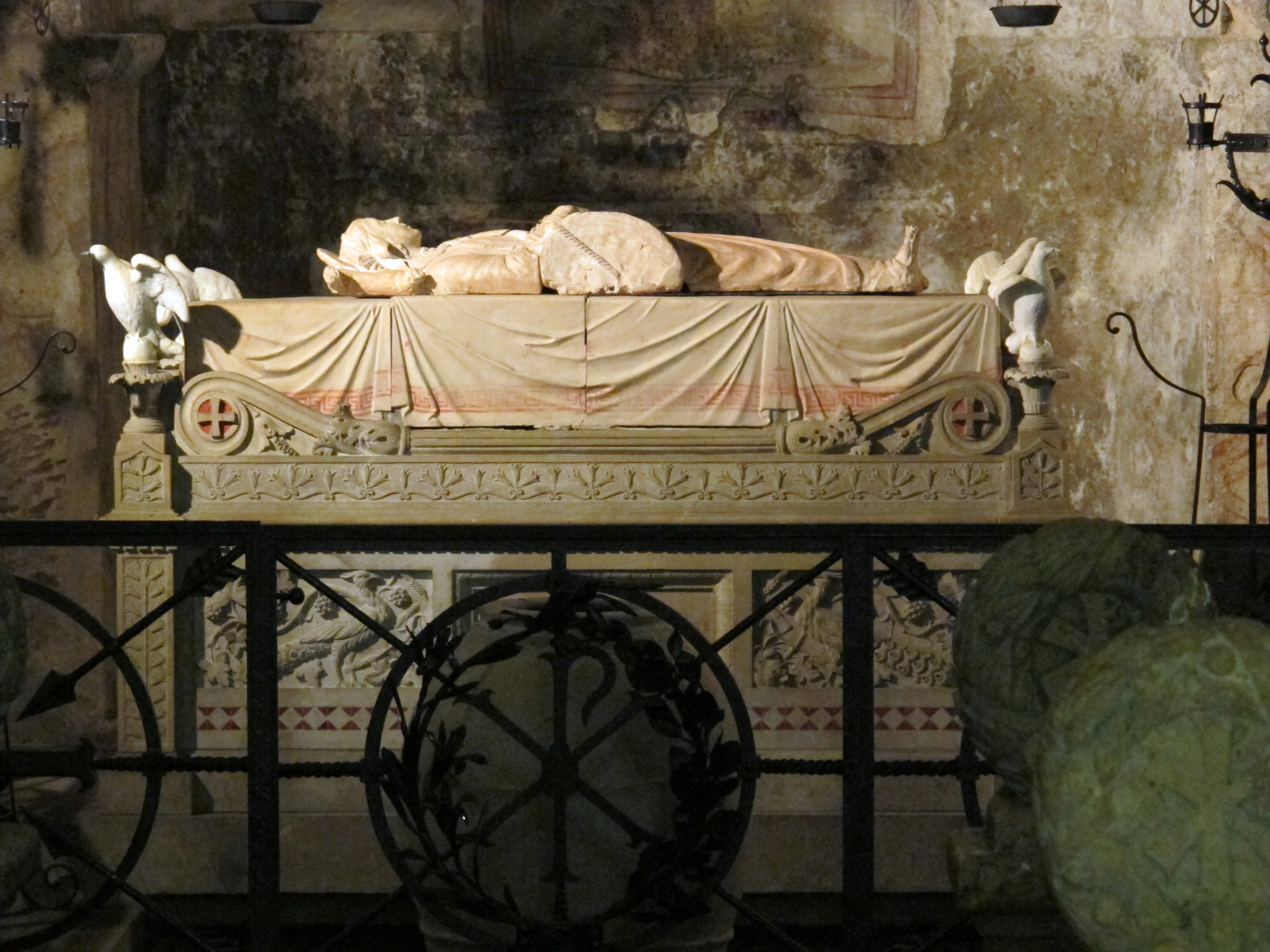
The Tomb of St Cristina with Buglioni sculpture in the center the statue illustrates the stone used in the attempt to drown her.

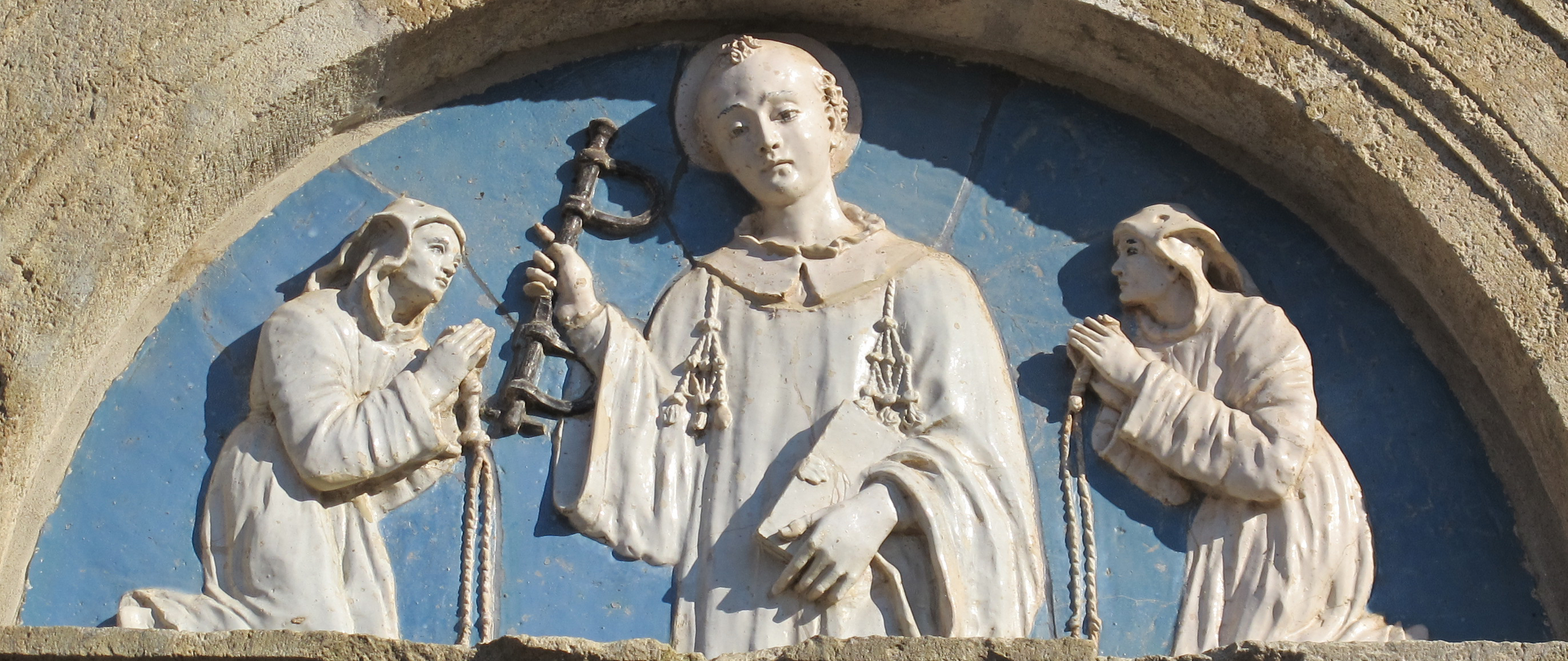
Entrance portal lunette by Buglioni

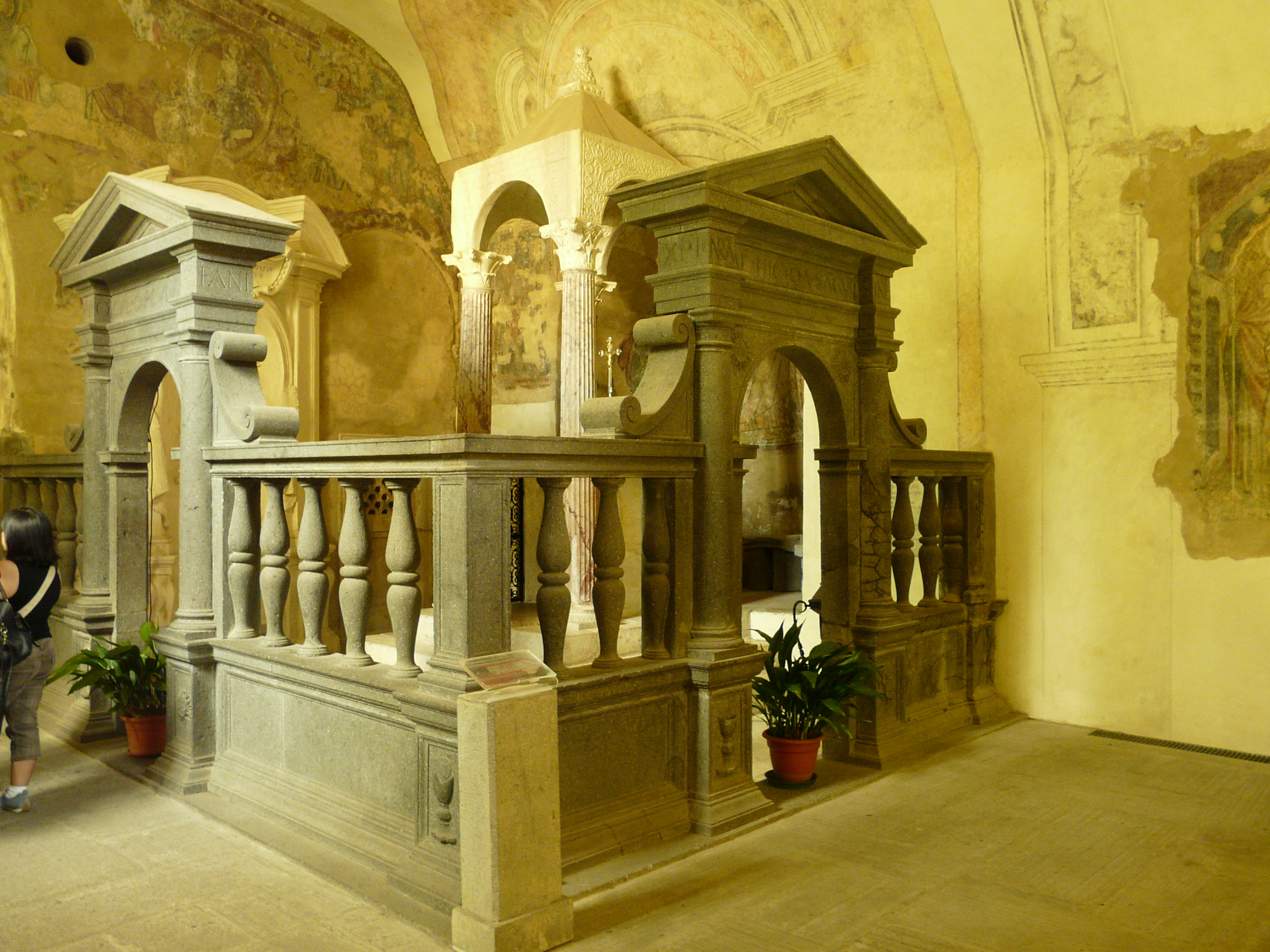
Altar of the Miracle inside Grotto of Santa Cristina

The church was consecrated by Pope Gregory VII in 1077. The façade was commissioned by Pope Leo X, and completed in 1492 to 1494 with designs by Francesco and Benedetto Buglioni. The two portals have polychrome lunettes by the Florentine artists, in the style of Della Robbia. To the left of the façade is the late-baroque external entrance to the Chapel of the Miracle. The tall 13th-century belltower has Romanesque mullioned windows.

== Interior ==
The interior has three naves and has frescoes from the 14th through 16th centuries. The main altar has a polyptych (circa 1450) by Sano di Pietro.

To the right of the nave are two chapels. The first is the Chapel of the Santissimo Sacramento with a tabernacle by Buglioni. The second chapel, dedicated to St Lucy, has 15th-century frescoes by Giovanni Andrea de Ferrari and a bust of the saint by Buglioni.

To the left of the nave, through a marble portal, one can access the Chapel of the (Eucharistic) Miracle. The chapel is now enveloped in a large late-Baroque-style chapel to the left of the church with a cylindrical dome, designed by Tommaso Mattei. The façade was designed in 1693 by Virginio Vespignani. The main altarpiece depicts the miracle, painted by Francesco Trevisani. Below the painting, on the altar, a gilded frame (1940) was created to hold the blood-stained stone, that is supposedly a relic of the miracle. The Eucharist itself is on display in the Orvieto Cathedral.

Next to this chapel is the entrance to the Grotto of Santa Cristina, which hold paleochristian burials. The chapel has a balustrade protecting the actual altar of the miracle. The chapel has a terracotta icon of the saint laying alongside the rock used to try to achieve her martyrdom at the age of 11 years, by Benedetto Buglioni. There is also a wall supposedly with the footprints of the saint from her failed drowning. Below the Buglioni statue is the 4th-century sarcophagus which held the relics of the saint.
