= Christina of Bolsena =

Christian virgin and martyr

Saint Christina of Bolsena
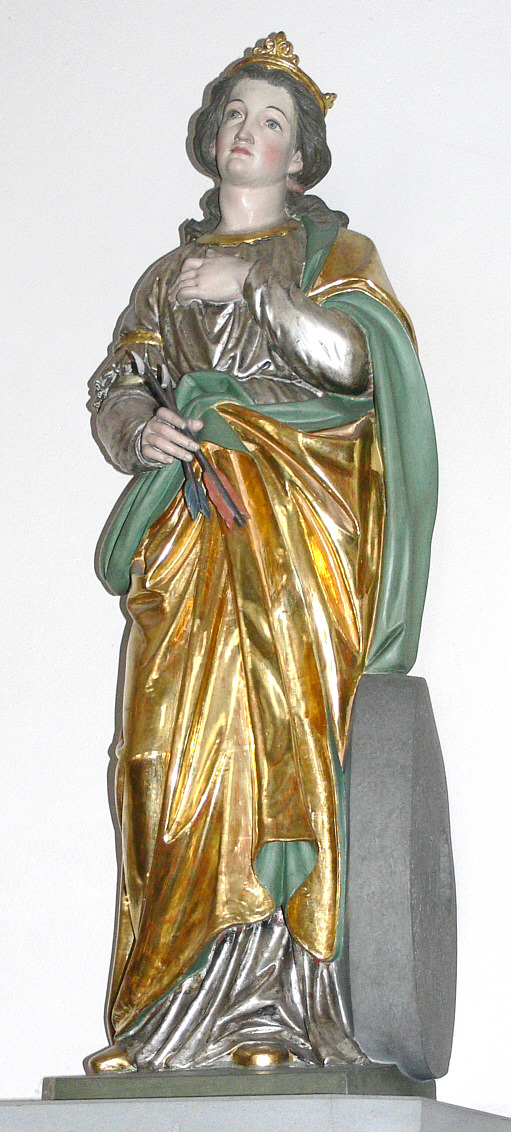
- St Christina, by Moriz Schlachter, (c.1889)

Virgin and martyr
- Born: 3rd Century; Tyre modern-day Lebanon
- Died: 3rd Century; Bolsena, Lazio, Italy
- Venerated in: Roman Catholic Church; Eastern Orthodox Church
- Canonized: Pre-Congregation
- Major shrine: Basilica of Santa Cristina, Bolsena, Italy
- Feast: 24 July
- Attributes: pierced by three arrows

Christina of Bolsena, also known as Christina of Tyre, or in the Eastern Orthodox Church as Christina the Great martyr, is venerated as a virgin martyr of the third century. Archaeological excavations of an underground cemetery constructed over her tomb have shown that she was venerated at Tyre by the fourth century.

== Life ==
The existence of Christina is poorly attested. Some versions of her legend place her in Tyre (Phoenicia), while other evidence points to Bolsena, an ancient town in central Italy near an Etruscan settlement called Volsinium. There were found some catacombs in which were the remains of an early Christian church and the tomb of a female martyr. Inscriptions at the site confirmed the martyr had a name like "Christina", and that the local community was already venerating her as a saint by the end of the fourth century. Some corroborating evidence is also provided by a sixth-century mosaic in the Basilica of Sant'Apollinare Nuovo in Ravenna, which includes a procession of virgins, one of which is a saint named Christina wearing a martyr's crown.

== Traditional accounts ==
Christina is an early virgin Christian martyr. By the ninth century, an account of her martyrdom was composed, which developed many variants. According to these, she was born either in Tyre (Eastern stories) or in Persia (Western stories) during the third century or fifth century.

She was born into a rich family, and her father was governor of Tyre. By the age of 11, the girl was exceptionally beautiful, and many wanted to marry her. Christina's father, however, envisioned that his daughter should become a pagan priestess. To this end, he placed her in a special dwelling where he had set up many gold and silver idols, and he commanded his daughter to burn incense before them. Two servants also attended Christina.

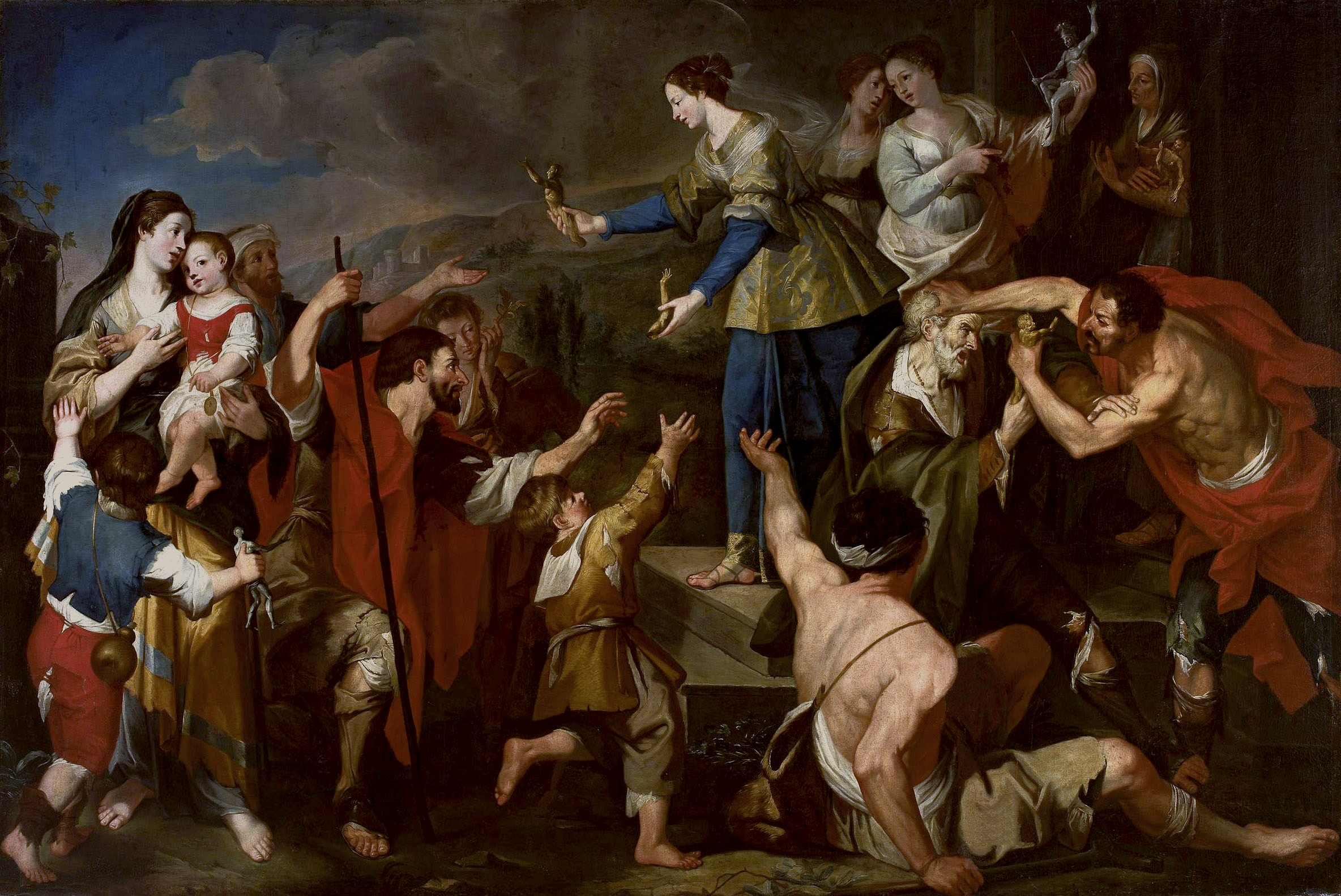
Saint Christina giving her father's idols of gold to the poor, 17th-century, in the National Museum in Warsaw

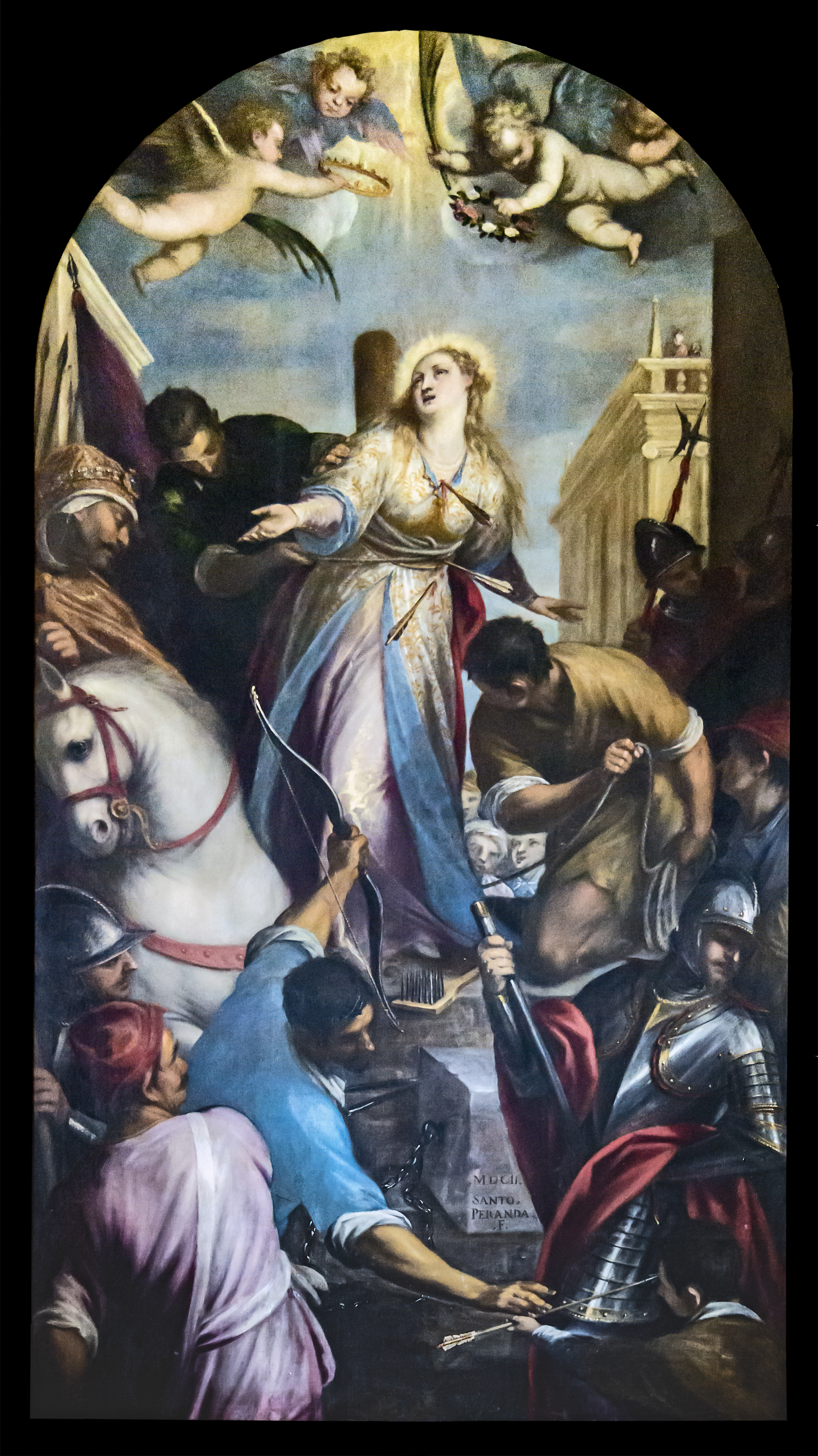
Martyrdom of Saint Christina in the Basilica of San Zanipolo in Venice, Italy.

According to some accounts, Christina was once visited by an angel, who instructed her in the Christian religion. The angel then called her a bride of Christ and told her about her future suffering. Christina then smashed all the idols in her room and threw the pieces out the window. On visiting his daughter, Christina's father, Urbanus, asked her where all the idols had disappeared. Christina was silent, but upon summoning the two servants, Urbanus learned the truth from them.

Urbanus had his daughter tortured because of her faith, but God thwarted his efforts. The nature of her torture varies with each source, and can include iron hooks, grilling by fire, placement in a furnace, torture on the wheel, assault by snakes, assailment by arrows, and other assorted methods, all of which she survives. After her father's death, his successor Dion continued to torture her. Christina is eventually beheaded.

== Veneration ==
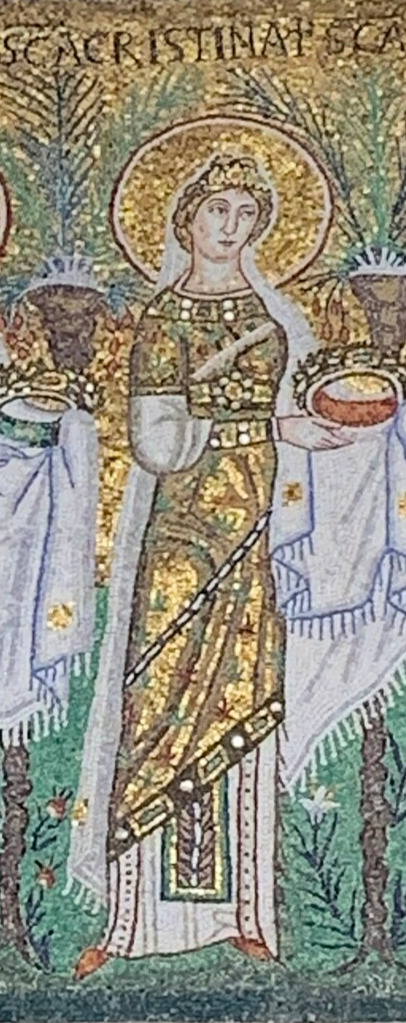
Mosaic from the Basilica di Sant'Apollinare Nuovo

The entry for her in the 2004 Roman Martyrology:

At Bolsena in Tuscany, Saint Christina, Virgin and Martyr. This virgin, believing in Christ, when had broken the gold and silver idols of her father, and had distributed their fragments to the poor, she was torn to pieces by the order of the same father with lashes, and was tortured with other tortures, and thrown into the lake with a great weight of stone, but was saved by an angel. Then, under another judge, her father's successor, she constantly endured more severe tortures; lastly … behind the burning furnace, where she remained unharmed for five days, after the serpents had been overcome by the power of Christ, she completed the course of her martyrdom … being pierced with arrows.

Christina was once included in the General Roman Calendar; the older Tridentine calendar gave her a commemoration within the Mass of the Vigil of Saint James the Great. When Pope Pius XII suppressed this vigil as part of his 1955 reforms, celebration of Saint Christina became a "simple" and by 1960, a "commemoration". The 1969 revision omitted her from that calendar, "because nothing is known of this virgin and martyr apart from her name and her burial at Bolsena", but not from the Martyrology, the official list of recognized saints.

According to the present rubrics of the Roman Missal, Saint Christina may be celebrated with a "memorial" everywhere on her feast day, unless in some locality a different, obligatory celebration is assigned to that day.

=== Relics ===
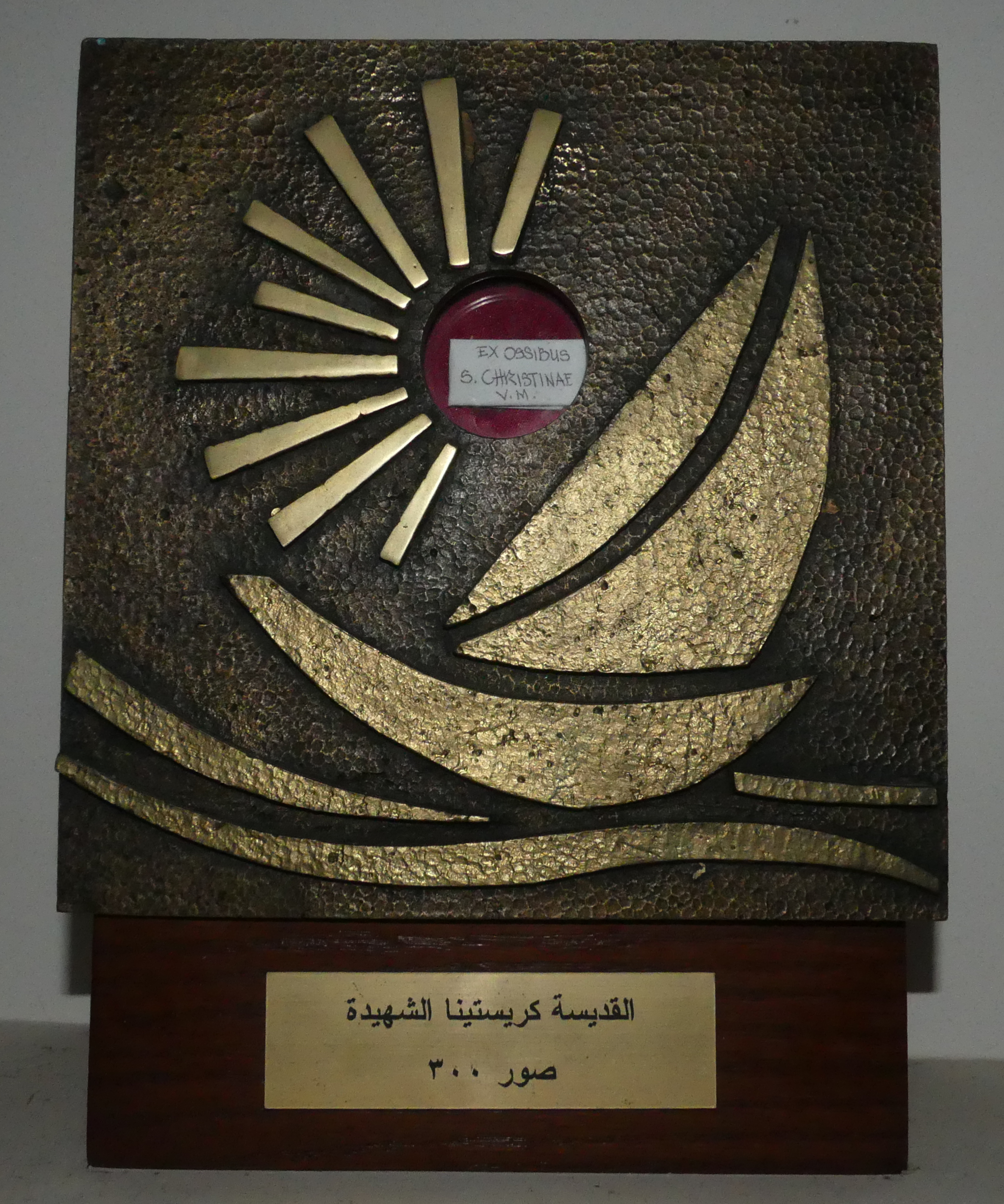
Relic of Saint Christina at the Maronite Cathedral of Our Lady of the Seas in Tyre, Lebanon

Toffia in the Province of Rieti displays her relics in a transparent urn. Palermo, of which Christina is one of four patron saints, also claims to enshrine her relics at the Church of Santa Cristina Gela, an Arbëresh village 20 kilometres south of the city. The church of San Francesco della Vigna in Venice, Italy claims to have the incorrupt body of Saint Christina.

Contrary to local belief, Saint Christina of Bolsena is not the individual whose relics are enshrined in the Cathedral of Saint John the Evangelist in Cleveland, Ohio.

== Miracle of Bolsena ==
A second legend is connected to Christina. The Eucharistic miracle, depicted in Raphael's The Mass at Bolsena, is often considered to be the catalyst for the Feast of Corpus Christi. In the Umbria region in 1263, a priest named Peter from Prague harboured doubts on the Real Presence of Christ in the Host during Mass via transubstantiation. During his pilgrimage towards Rome he prayed to be relieved of his questions. Peter said Mass at the Basilica of Santa Cristina in Bolsena: as he repeated the Words of Institution, the Host dripped the Precious Blood on his hands, and it spilled onto the corporal beneath.
