= Palazzo del Drago =

Coordinates: 42.64647°N 11.98459°E

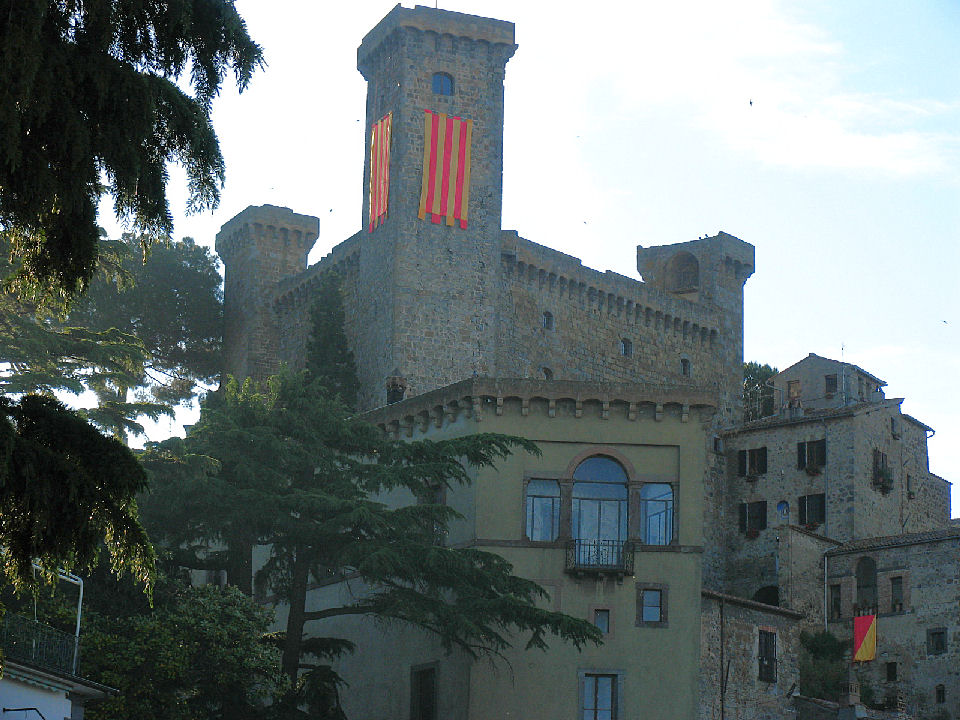
Serlian window of the Palace below the town castle

Palazzo Netti is a Renaissance architecture aristocratic palace located on Via Francesco Cozza #2 in the town of Bolsena, region of Lazio, Italy. It rises adjacent to the Rocca Monaldeschi della Cervara, and overlooks the town. It is part of the network of Dimore Storiche Italiane, and with reservations and for a fee, can be used for cultural and private functions or tours.

== History ==
The Palazzo was commissioned by Cardinal Tiberio Crispo, the governor of Bolsena, who had close ties to the Farnese family and Pope Paul III. Utilizing some of the houses and structures at the site, much of the palace was designed by Raffaello da Montelupo and Simone Mosca, and built from 1533 to 1561. During the phase of construction during 1554–1561, the construction was guided by Tommaso di Giacomo Bevilacqua, and later Giulio Merisi da Caravaggio. Crispo was removed as governor of Bolsena in 1562.

Many of the interior frescoes were completed by Prospero Fontana. Among the stories depicted are:

1. Images of Alexander the Great (likely in homage to Alessandro Farnesse).
2. Bacchanal with Chariot of Bacchus
3. Life of Moses
4. Monochrome scenes honoring Ancient Roman Virtue and Judgement
5. Monochrome scenes of the history of Rome and Bolsena

After the death of Cardinal Crispo, the Palazzo passed to the Spada Veralli Potenziani family. The palace had undergone some decline and suffered from the Napoleonic occupations. In 1894, Maria Angelica Spada Veralli married Ferdinando del Drago. During World War II, the palace suffered damage from the Allied bombardments. The palace during slowly underwent restorations under owner of the del Drago family, who continue to own the palace.
