= The thrown stones =

The Thrown Stones
- Italian: Pietre lanciate
- Interactive map of The Thrown Stones
- Nearest city: Bolsena, Italy
- Coordinates: 42.6326°N 11.9972°E

The Thrown Stones (Italian: pietre lanciate) is a geological formation of columnar basalt, prisms of volcanic rock rising from the ground, located near Bolsena, Italy.

The shape of the thrown stones has caught the curiosity of many travelers going to Rome. About a kilometer from the town of Bolsena, which leads to Montefiascone along the Cassia, you can observe a columnar basalt rock formation: naturally-formed prisms of volcanic rock.

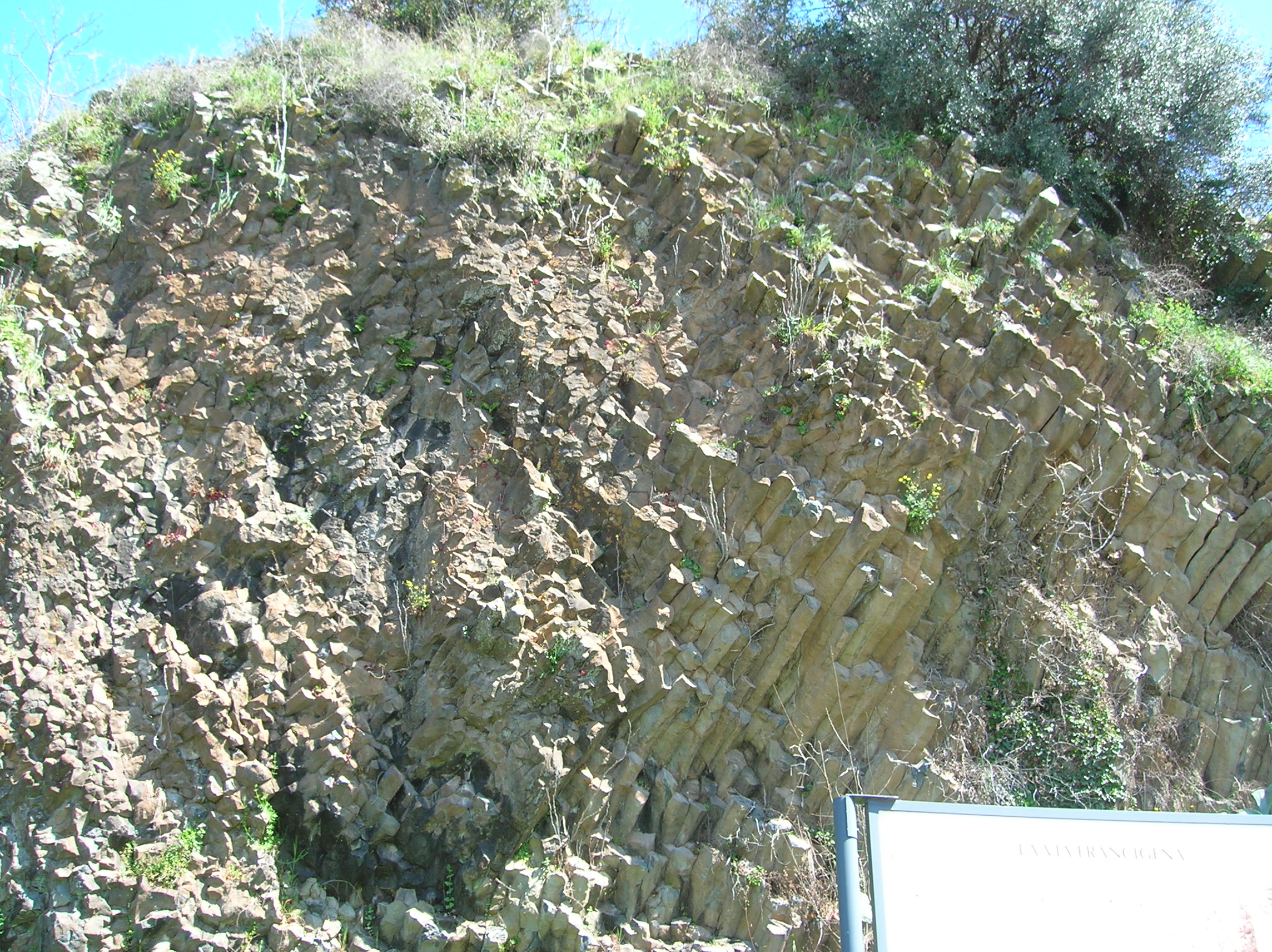
The thrown stones

== Etymology ==
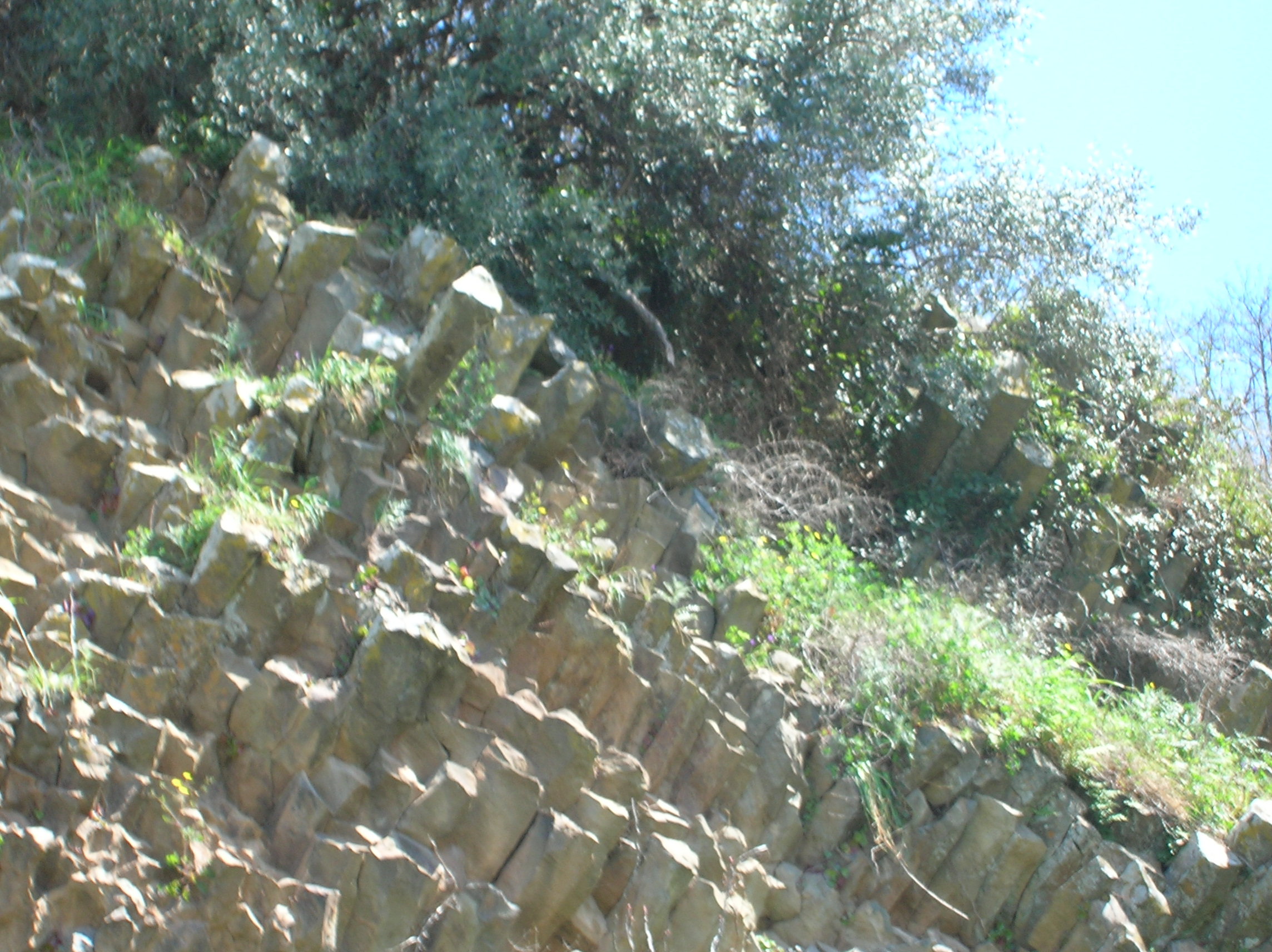
The thrown stones

The “thrown stones” the popular term, which is commonly referred to these particular rocks, was coined by the locals in an attempt to understand what seemed like an inexplicable phenomenon. People imagined that the volcano, that is now replaced by Lake Bolsena, had thrown stones during an eruption and that they had driven into the ground.

== Morphology ==
The morphology of this basaltic wall is due to the intense volcanic activity that affected the area one million years ago and in particular to the magma that came in contact with water, which has taken the form of a pentagonal or hexagonal rock column. In some cases the so-called "heads" of the basalts are not smooth, but have a rough surface due to melt conformations called "volcanic".

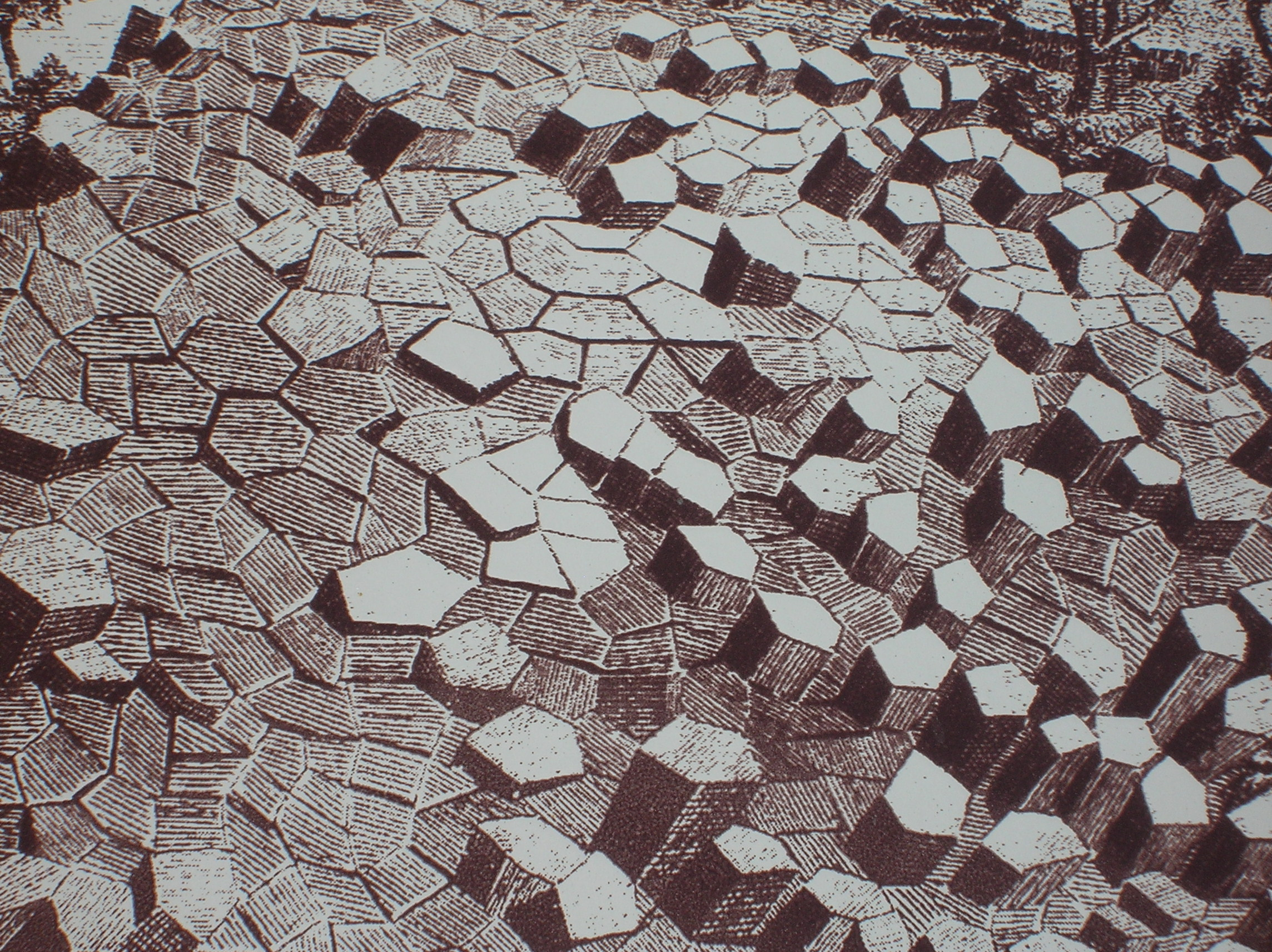
The thrown stones

== See also ==
- List of places with columnar jointed volcanics
