= Bolsena =

- Comune
- Comune di Bolsena
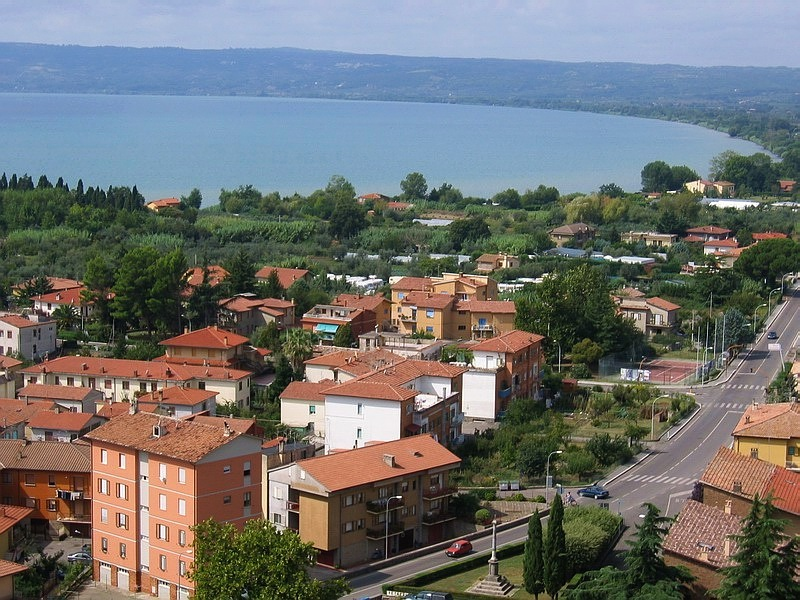
- View of the city with the lake.

- Coat of arms

- Location within Italy Location within Lazio
- Coordinates: 42°38′41″N 11°59′09″E
- Country: Italy
- Region: Lazio
- Province: Viterbo (VT)

Government
  - Mayor: Paolo Equitani

Area
  - Total: 63.57 km^{2} (24.54 sq mi)
- Elevation: 350 m (1,150 ft)

Population (30 April 2017)
  - Total: 3,903
  - Density: 61.40/km^{2} (159.0/sq mi)
- Demonym: Bolsenesi
- Time zone: UTC+1 (CET)
  - Summer (DST): UTC+2 (CEST)
- Postal code: 01023
- Dialing code: 0761
- Patron saint: St. Christine Martyr
- Saint day: July 24
- Website: Official website

Bolsena is a town and comune of Italy, in the province of Viterbo in northern Lazio on the eastern shore of Lake Bolsena. It is 10 km (6 mi) north-north west of Montefiascone and 36 km (22 mi) north-west of Viterbo. The ancient Via Cassia, today's highway SR143, follows the lakeshore for some distance, passing through Bolsena. Bolsena is named "the city of the Eucharistic miracle" from which the solemnity of Corpus Domini had been extended to the whole Catholic Church.

== History ==
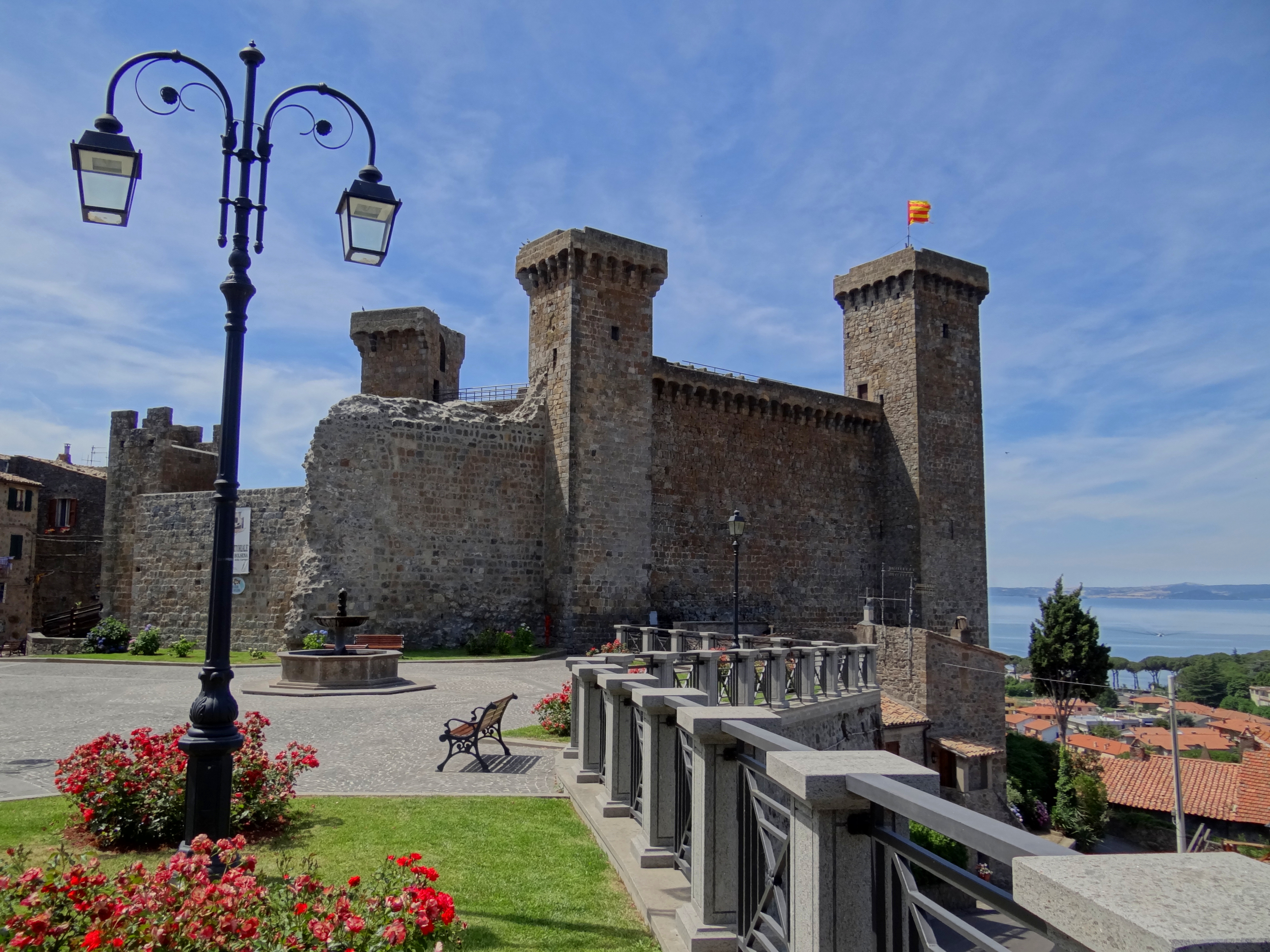
The Castle of Bolsena.

While it is fairly certain that the city is the successor to the ancient Roman town of Volsinii (sometimes termed Volsinii Novi – New Volsinii – to distinguish it from the Etruscan city), scholarly opinion is sharply divided as to whether Volsinii was the same as the ancient Etruscan city of Velzna or Velsuna (sometimes termed Volsinii Veteres – Old Volsinii), the other candidate being Orvieto, 20 km (12 mi) NE. George Dennis pointed out that the town of Bolsena has no Etruscan characteristics; for example, Etruscan cities were built on defensible crags, which the hill on which the castle is situated is not. The Roman historian Pliny the Elder said that a bolt from Mars fell on Bolsena, "the richest town in Tuscany" and that the city was entirely burned up by this bolt. The population moved to another site, which Dennis thought was Bolsena. The new city was named after the old, hence Roman Bolsena has an Etruscan name. Dennis suggests a number of crags in the area including Orvieto but does not favor Orvieto on the grounds that it is too far away.

== Etruscan tombs ==
A number of Etruscan tombs have been found in the vicinity of Bolsena. Funerary objects from these tombs are now located in Italy and abroad, including a fine collection in the British Museum.

== Miracle ==
Bolsena is known for a miracle said to have occurred in the Basilica of Santa Cristina in 1263, when a Bohemian priest, in doubt about the doctrine of Transubstantiation, reported bleeding from the host he had consecrated at Mass. The Orvieto Cathedral was eventually built to commemorate the miracle and house the Corporal of Bolsena in a reliquary made by Sienese goldsmith Ugolino di Vieri in 1337–1338.

The Mass at Bolsena, a famed fresco by Raphael and his school in the Vatican Stanze, depicts the event.

== US Navy base ==
The United States Navy established a naval air station on 21 February 1918 to operate seaplanes during World War I. The base closed shortly after the First Armistice at Compiègne.

== Other sites ==
- Basilica of Santa Cristina, Bolsena
- The thrown stones, a nearby rock formation
- Palazzo del Drago: Renaissance palace designed by Raffaele da Montelupo and Simone Mosca
- Church of Santa Cristina
