= Palazzo Arcivescovile (Ferrara) =

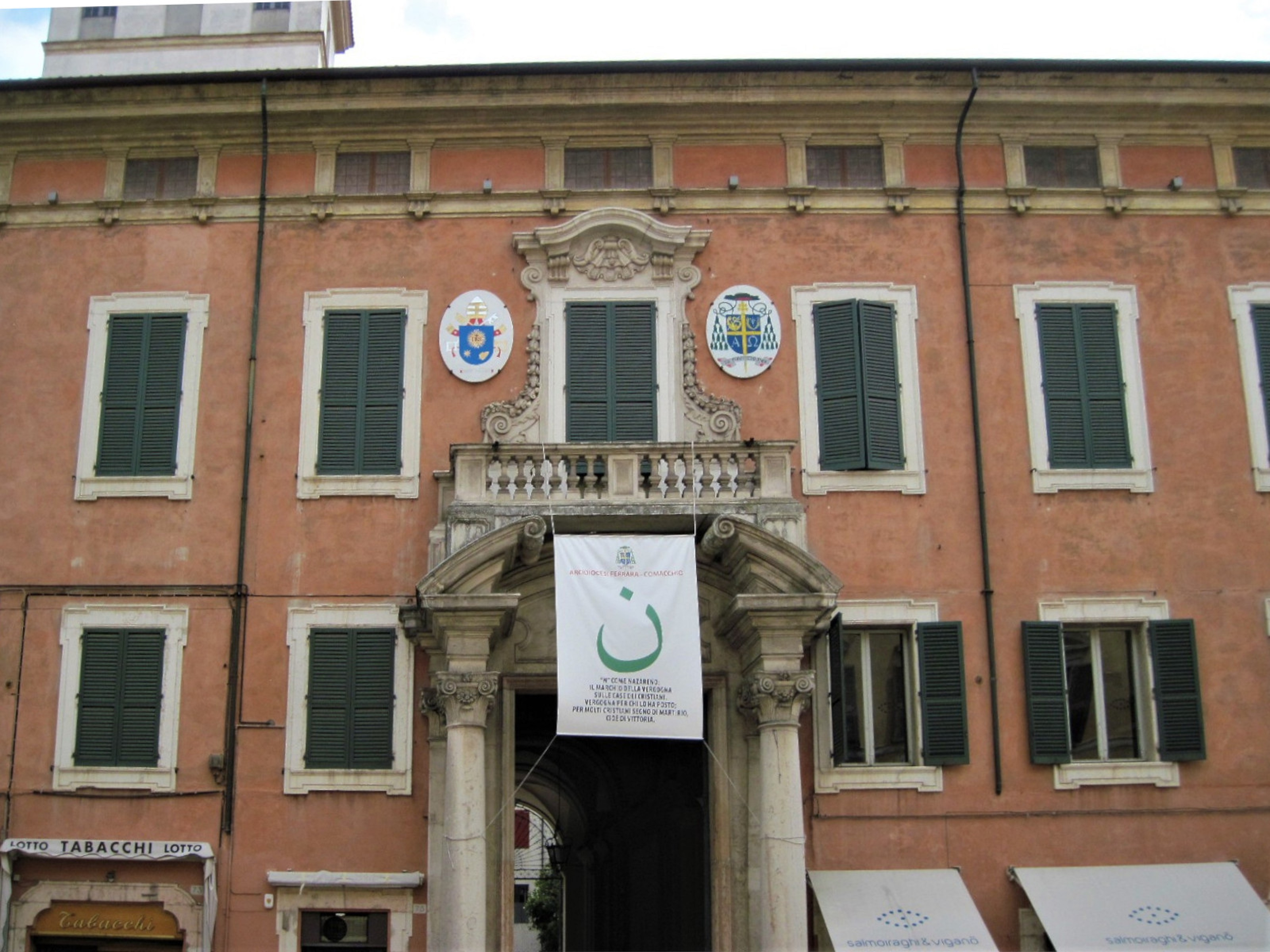
- Monumental portal on Corso Martiri della Libertà
- Interactive map of the Palazzo Arcivescovile (Ferrara) area

General information
- Status: In use
- Type: Palace
- Architectural style: Renaissance
- Location: Ferrara, Italy, corso Martiri della Libertà
- Coordinates: 44.836386°N 11.619716°E
- Construction started: 12th century
- Completed: 18th century

Design and construction
- Architect: Tommaso Mattei

The Archiepiscopal palace of Ferrara, commissioned by the cardinal legates Tommaso Ruffo, was built in its recent form starting from 1717. It is located in Corso Martiri della Libertà next to the Cathedral of San Giorgio.

== History ==
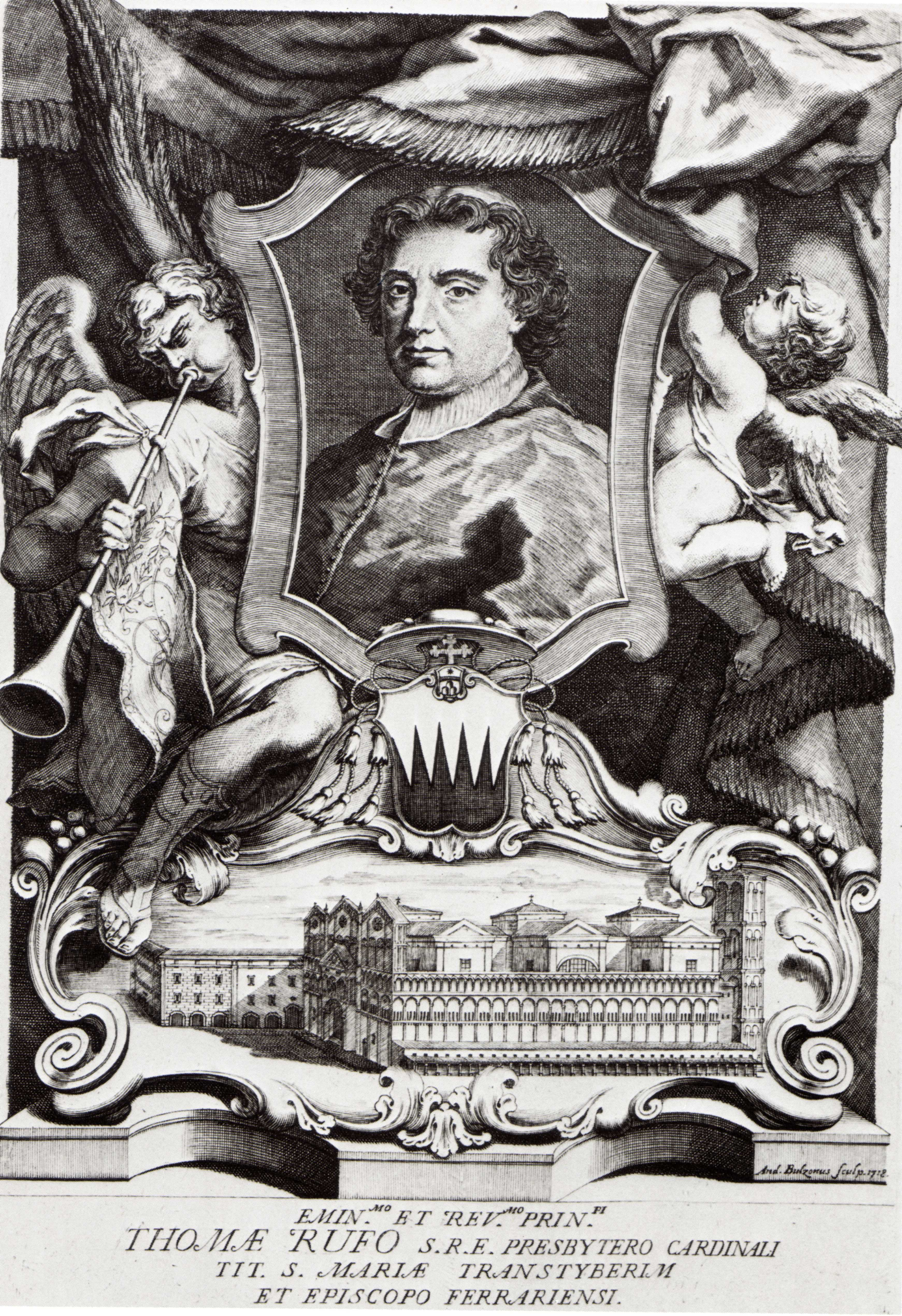
Portrait of Cardinal Tommaso Ruffo, by Andrea Bolzoni. Below the portrait, the cathedral and the archbishop's palace

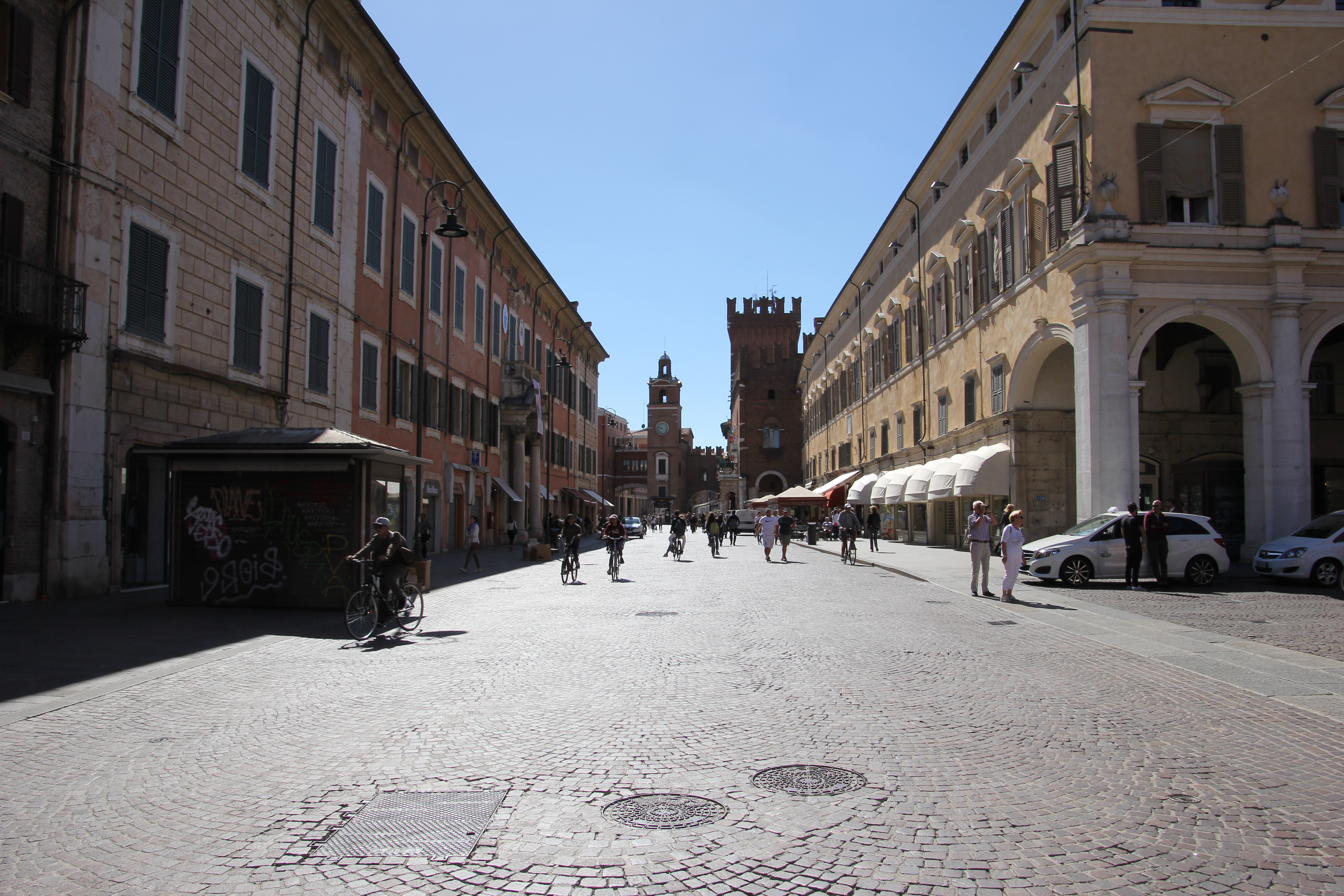
Corso Martiri della Libertà with the Archbishop's Palace and palazzo Municipale placed opposite each other.

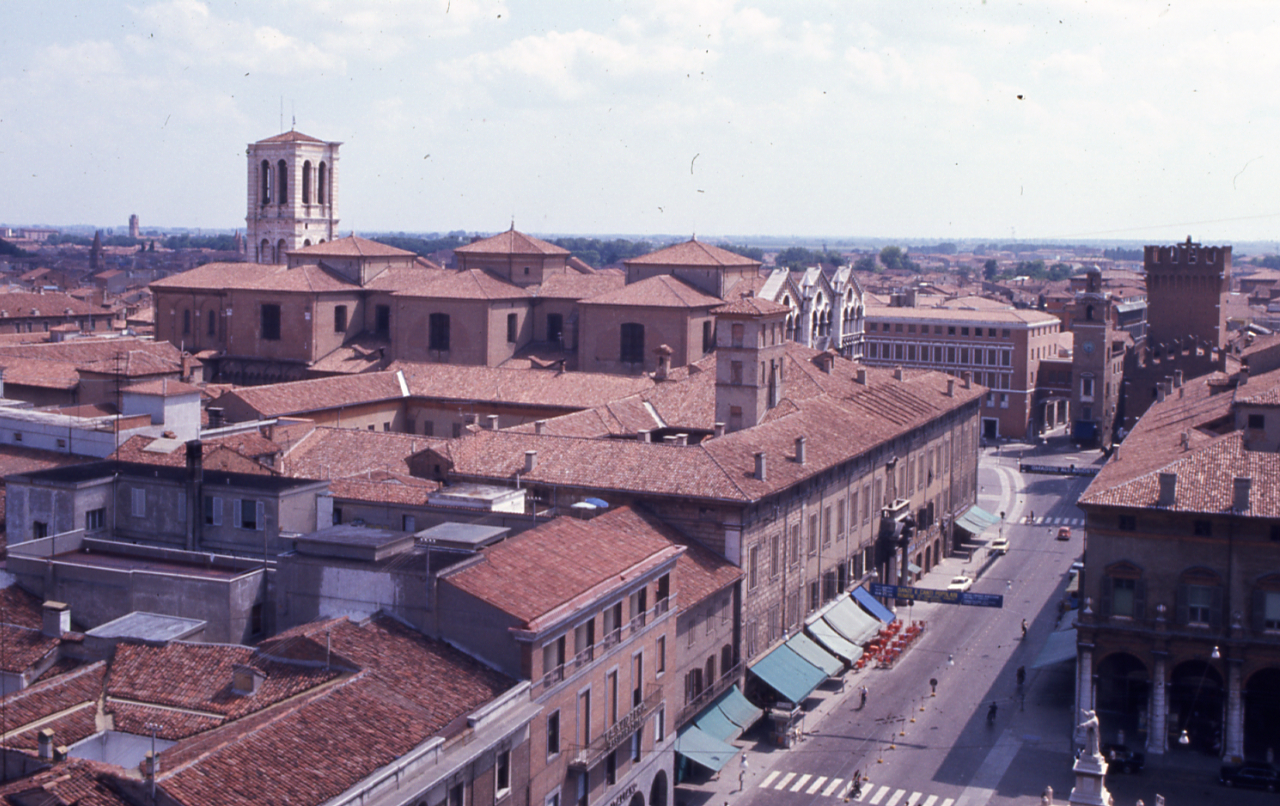
Palazzo Arcivescovile in a photographic reportage by Paolo Monti from 1974.

At least until 1172, the bishops had at their disposal, within the primitive Ferrarese city walls laid out exclusively near the ancient course of the Po di Primaro, a building at the church of Santo Stefano, and this was before the city's religious and political centre moved further north than before, during the period of the city's expansion. With the construction of the new cathedral to replace the basilica of San Giorgio fuori le mura, a new bishop's palace was built from the end of the 12th century, smaller in size than the modern building. Subsequently, at the behest of bishop Giovanni Tavelli da Tossignano, starting in 1441, the primitive bishop's residence was enlarged with a new wing that reached as far as the cathedral square, making its façade more important and, at the same time, the interiors were enriched with decorations that have partly survived.

The reconstruction in modern forms was commissioned by Cardinal Tommaso Ruffo, who considered the palace as the bishop's seat used up to that time to be too modest in size and insufficiently prestigious. The project for its reconstruction was initially entrusted to Tommaso Mattei, a Roman architect. In the meantime, the cardinal acquired several adjacent buildings, had parts of the primitive palace demolished and had the new bishop’s see joined into a single monumental block. Work continued until at least 1724 and was entrusted to Vincenzo Santini, an architect from Veneto, who also worked on the Church of San Domenico (Ferrara).

After its reconstruction, it hosted illustrious personalities. In 1796 Napoleon Bonaparte met Cardinal Alessandro Mattei there and in 1857, as a guest of the Metropolitan Archbishop of Ferrara Luigi Vannicelli Casoni, he stayed there Pope Pius IX.

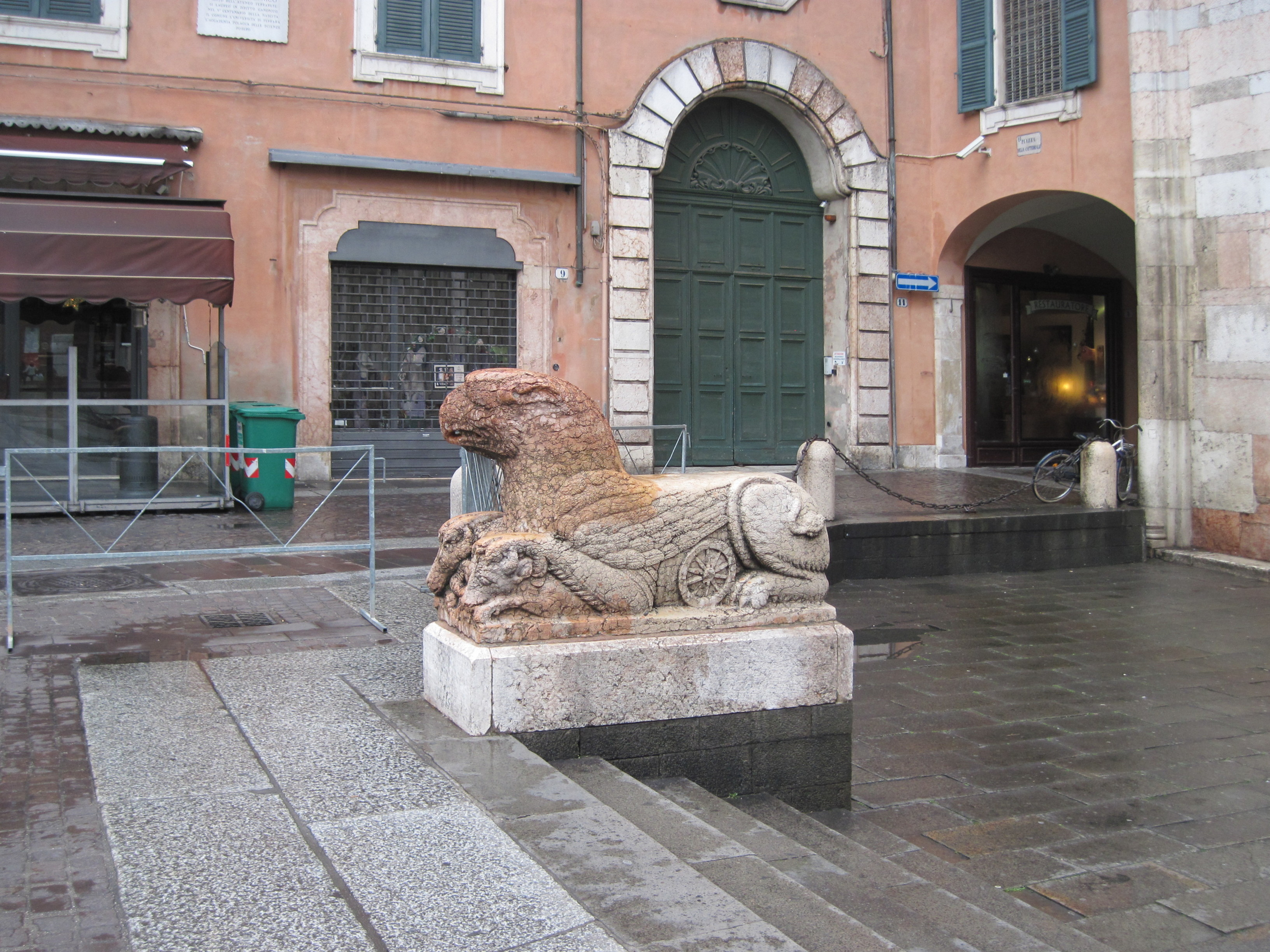
Piazza Duomo. Secondary portal of the Archiepiscopal Palace and, to its right, the face leading into Via Guglielmo degli Adelardi, under the passageway joining the palace to the cathedral.

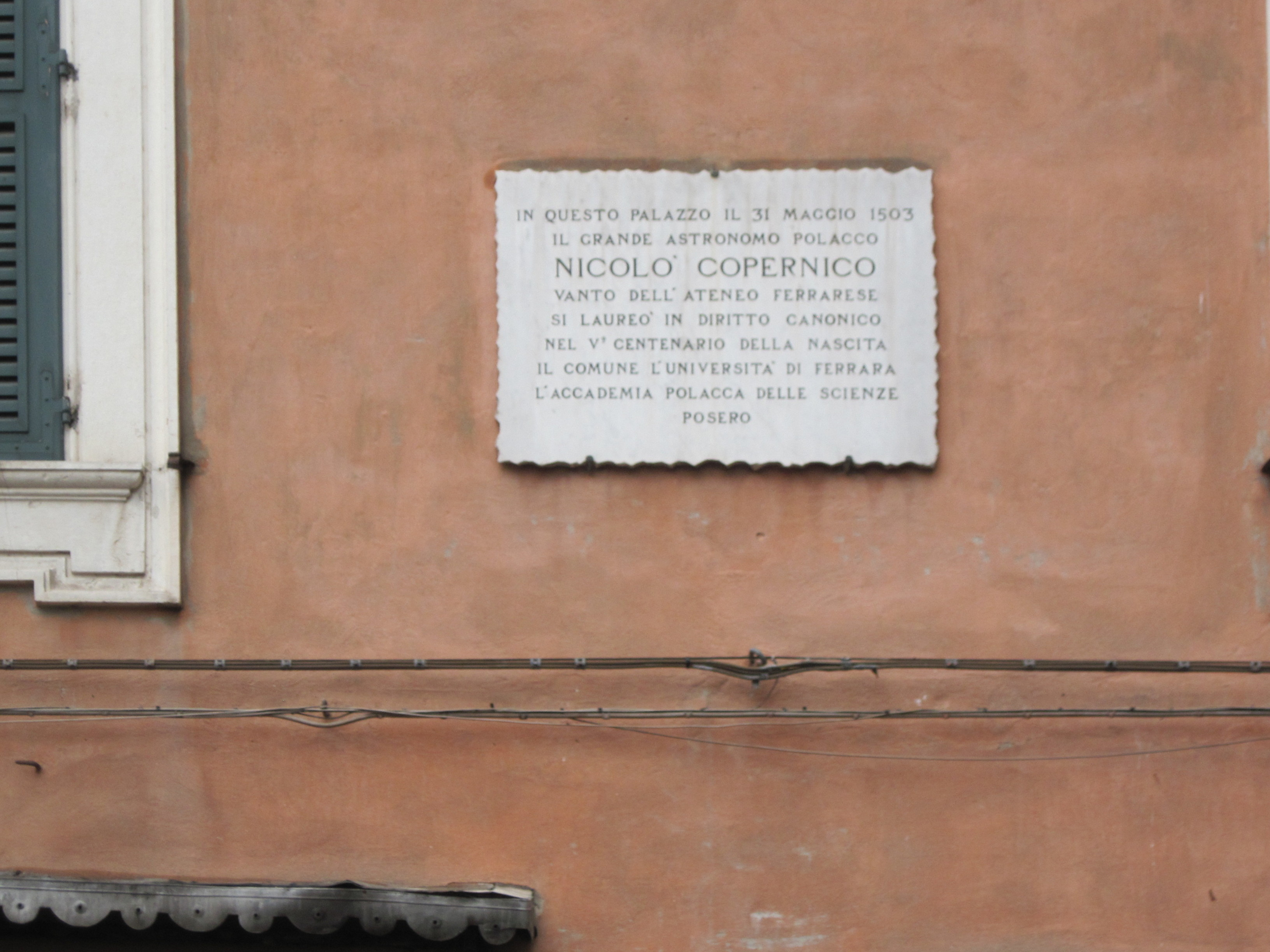
Lapide commemorating the degree in canon law obtained by Nicolaus Copernicus on the façade of the Archiepiscopal Palace facing Piazza Duomo.

=== Renovation of the former ducal palace ===
About fourteen years after the reconstruction of the archbishop’s palace the Dukes of Modena and Reggio Francesco III d'Este, still owner of the former ducal palace as heir to the Este dynasty that had ruled Ferrara until 1597, decided to have this building, which had been in very poor condition for some time, restored. He chose Angelo and Francesco Santini (Vincenzo’s sons) as architects to carry out his project and after this work, the new palace took on the appearance that has come down to us. The view of that part of the city thus changed significantly in just a few decades and the two palaces facing each other took on a size and appearance that gave them equal dignity. The Este duke thus regained some of the prestige he had lost in the city.

== Description ==
The palace is of considerable size and is characterised by a large portal that occupies two floors and supports, on its columns, the balcony on the second floor placed at the centre of the façade, facing the palazzo comunale. The interior is refined and decorated with stuccoes and frescoes. The monumental internal staircase, past the main entrance and before entering the building’s courtyard, is architecturally and artistically significant in the eighteenth-century Ferrara period. Vincenzo Santini’s son, Angelo, was inspired by this work for the ceremonial staircase of the palace of Renata di Francia. The ceiling is decorated with frescoes by Vittorio Bigari. There are statues and decorations attributed to Filippo Suzzi and Andrea Ferreri and, on the walls, a painting of the Madonna by Ippolito Scarsella.

The archbishop’s residence is joined directly to the cathedral by a raised passageway that forms a characteristic face. Through this passage from the cathedral square one reaches the historic via Guglielmo degli Adelardi (the ancient via Gorgadello).

== University headquarters ==
Before the seat of the Studium in 1567 was moved to the Palazzo Paradiso, and thus before its 18th-century reconstruction ordered by Cardinal Ruffo, in 1503 Nicolaus Copernicus obtained a degree in canon law there.

== Bibliography ==
=== Italian sources ===
- Francesco Scafuri, Alla ricerca della Ferrara perduta, prefazione di Folco Quilici, Ferrara, Faust Edizioni, 2015, ISBN 978-88-98147-34-2.
- Gerolamo Melchiorri, Nomenclatura ed etimologia delle piazze e strade di Ferrara e Ampliamenti, a cura di Carlo Bassi, Ferrara, 2G Editrice, 2009, ISBN 978-8889248218.
- Dimitri Ticconi, Tommaso Mattei, 1652-1726: l'opera di un architetto romano tra '600 e '700, saggio introduttivo di Sandro Benedetti, Roma, Gangemi, 2017,ISBN 978-88-492-3368-1, SBN IT\ICCU\CFI\0947702
