= The Mass at Bolsena =

Fresco by Raphael

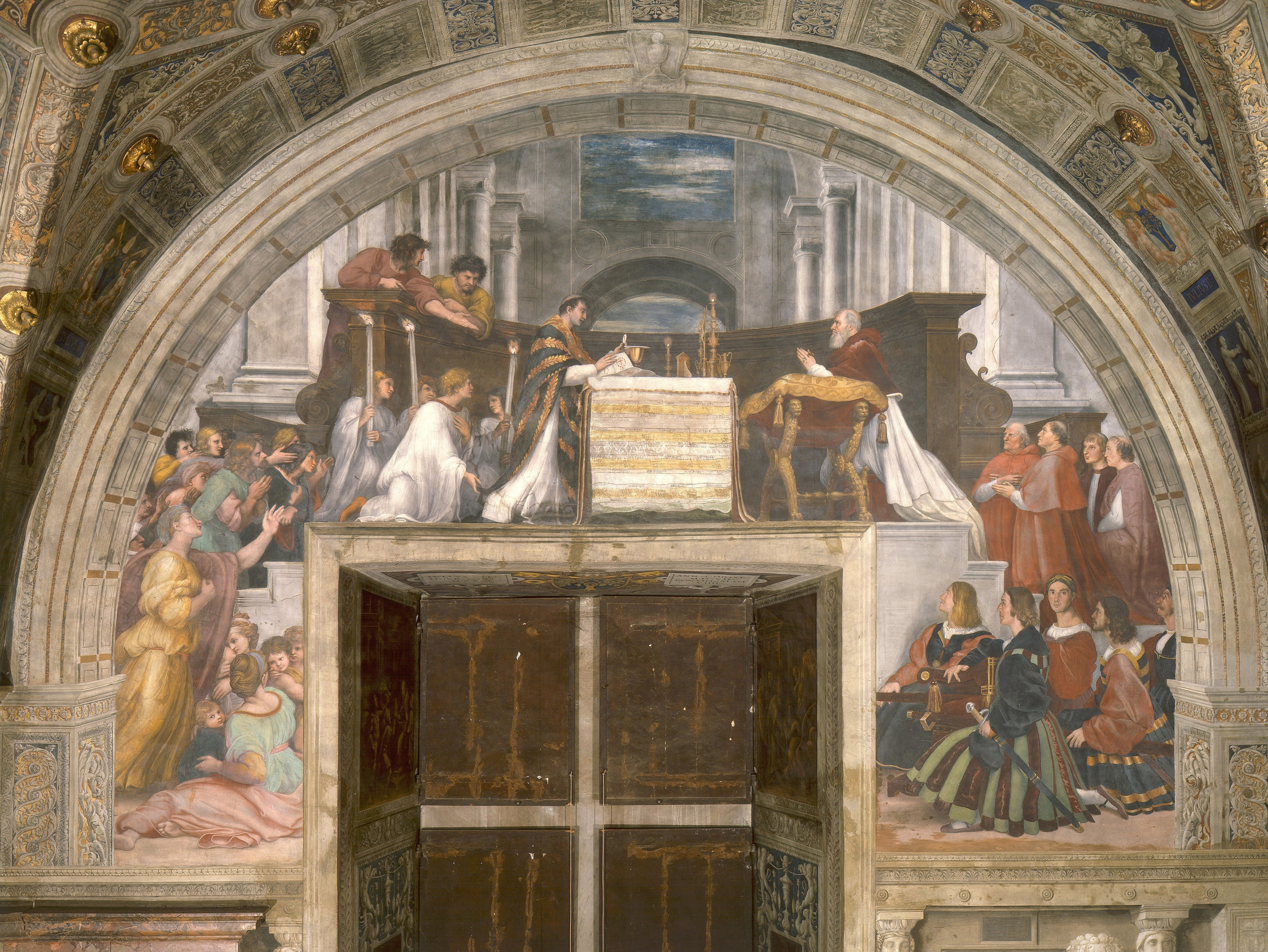
- Artist: Raphael
- Year: 1512-1514
- Type: Fresco
- Dimensions: 660 cm (260 in) wide
- Location: Apostolic Palace, Vatican Museums, Vatican City

The Mass at Bolsena is a painting by the Italian renaissance artist Raphael. It was painted between 1512 and 1514 as part of Raphael's commission to decorate with frescoes the rooms that are now known as the Raphael Rooms, in the Apostolic Palace in the Vatican. It is located in the Stanza di Eliodoro, which is named after The Expulsion of Heliodorus from the Temple.

The Mass at Bolsena depicts a Eucharistic miracle that is said to have taken place in 1263 at the church of Santa Cristina in Bolsena. A Bohemian priest who doubted the doctrine of transubstantiation was celebrating mass at Bolsena, when the bread of the eucharist began to bleed. The blood that spouted from the host fell onto the tablecloth in the shape of a cross and he was reconverted. The following year, in 1264, Pope Urban IV instituted the Feast of Corpus Christi to celebrate this miraculous event. The blood-stained Corporal of Bolsena is still venerated as a major relic in the Orvieto Cathedral.

Present in this painting is a self-portrait of the artist, Raphael, as one of the Swiss Guard in the lower right of the fresco, facing out with bound-up hair. This is one of several instances in which Raphael has placed himself in his paintings. Also shown in the work is Pope Julius II (1443–1513), kneeling at the right, and his daughter Felice della Rovere, shown on the left at the bottom of the steps, in profile, in dark clothes. The four cardinals to the right have also been identified as Leonardo Grosso della Rovere, Raffaello Riario, Tommaso Riario and Agostino Spinola, relatives of Julius.

== Gallery ==
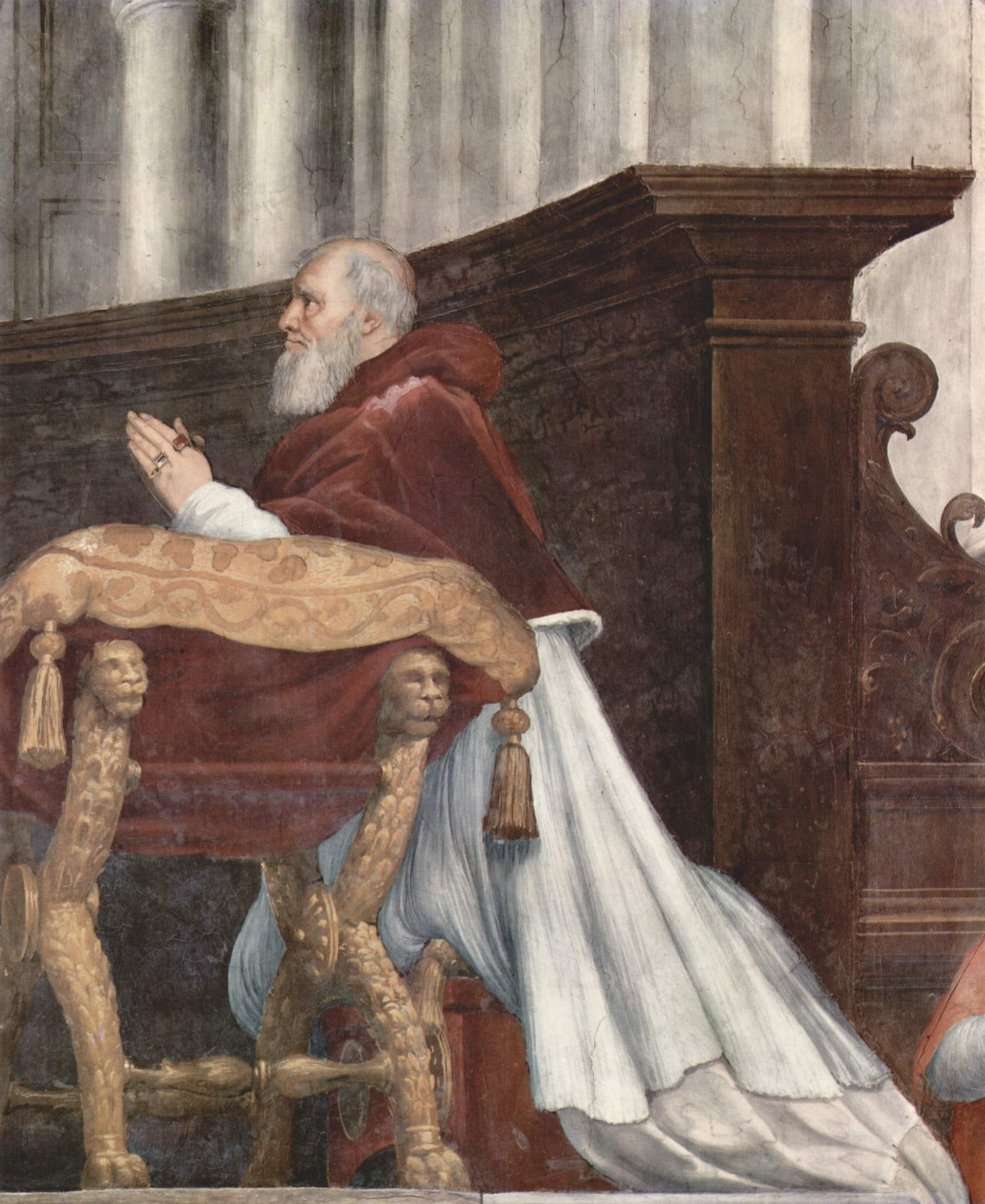
Pope Julius II

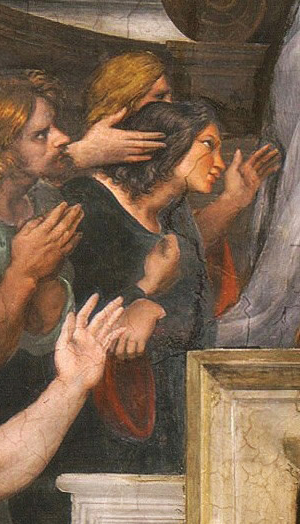
Felice della Rovere.

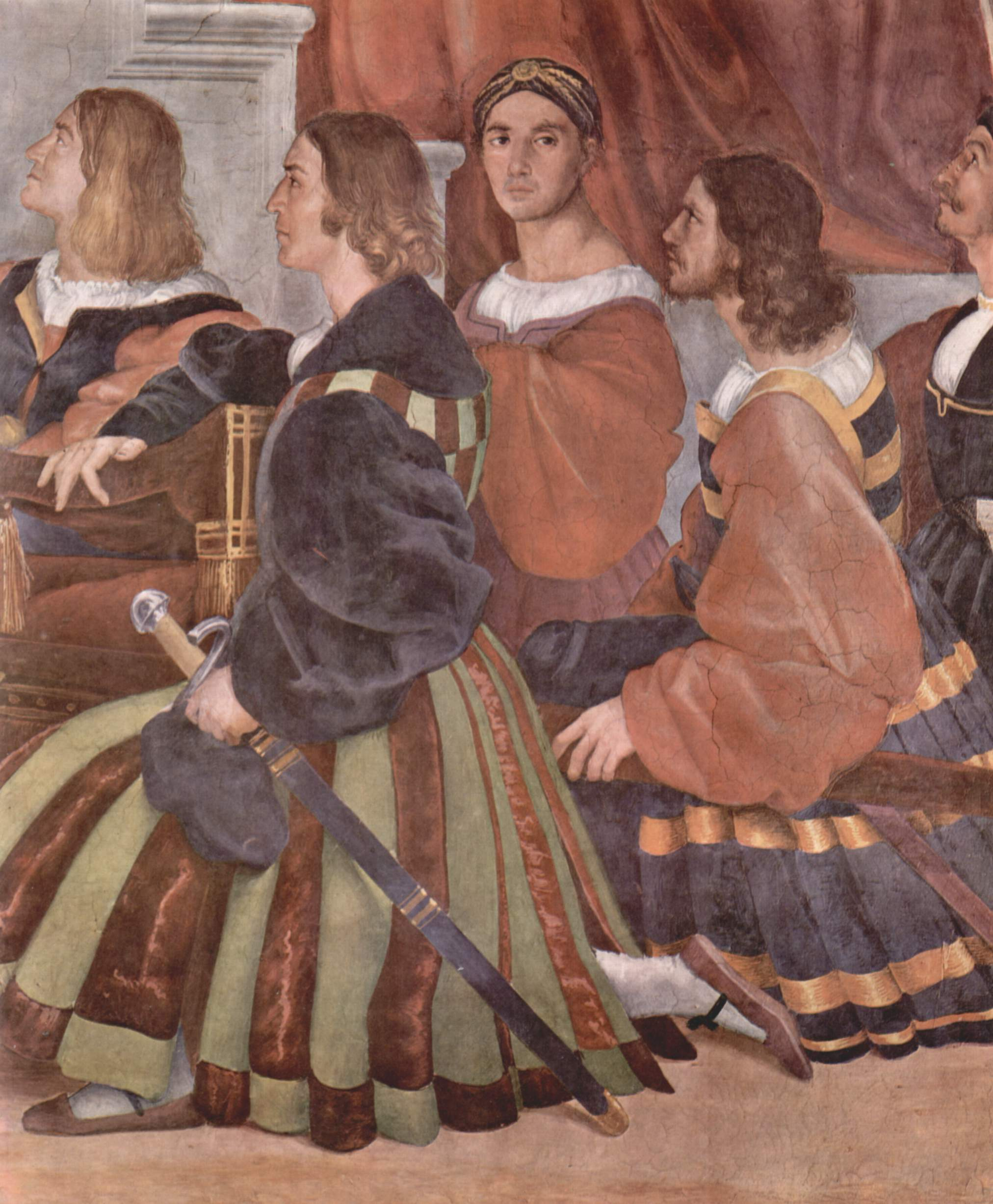
Raphael's self-portrait in the middle.
