= Palazzo Arcivescovile (Trento) =

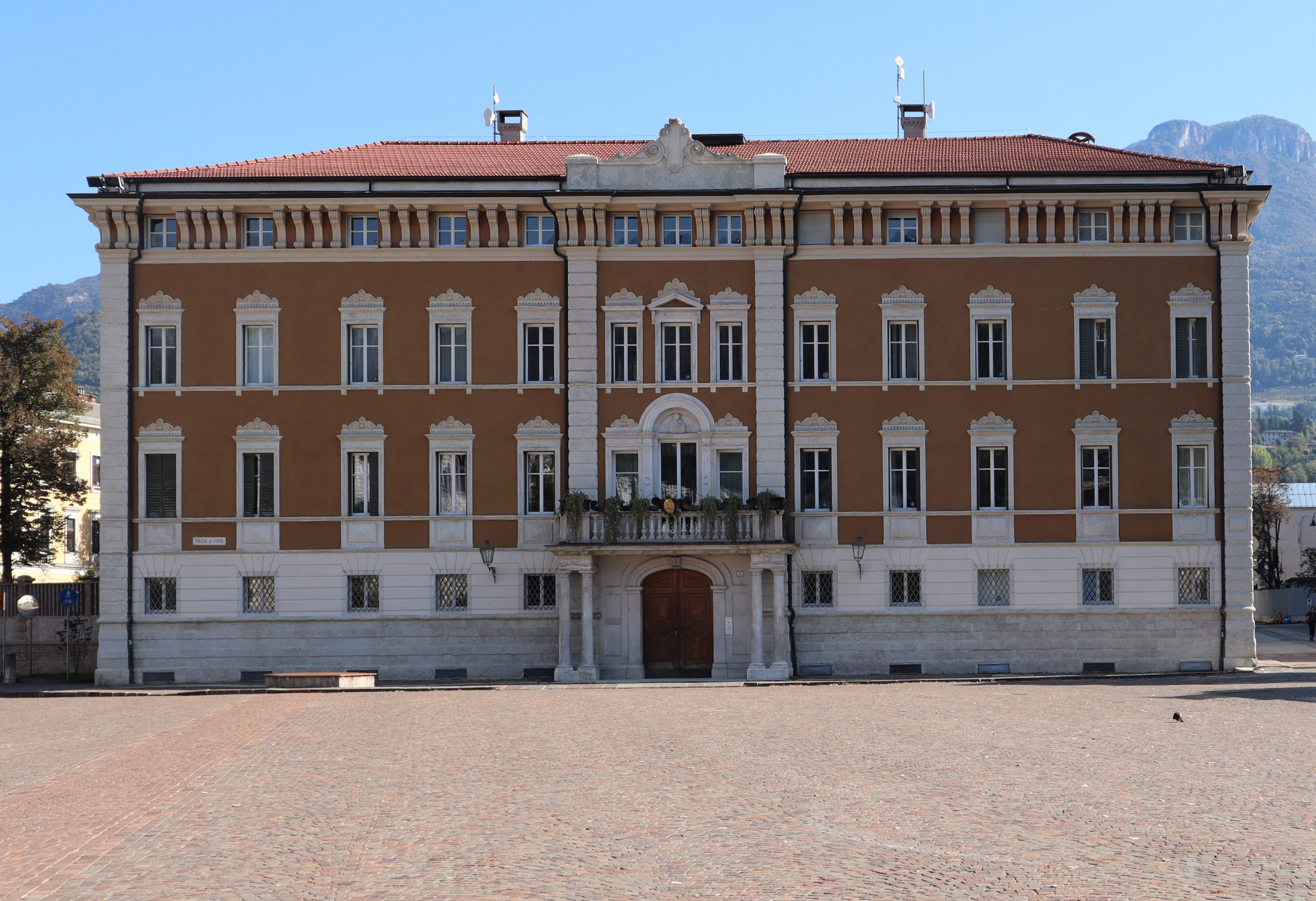
- Interactive map of the Palazzo Arcivescovile (Trento) area
- Alternative names: Palazzo della Curia, Palazzo Ceschi

General information
- Status: In use
- Type: Palace
- Architectural style: Renaissance
- Location: Trentino, Italy, 2, Via Francesco Barbacovi, piazza di Fiera
- Coordinates: 46.065102°N 11.1248°E
- Current tenants: residence of the Curia and the Archbishop of Trento
- Construction started: 16th century

Archiepiscopal Palace, also known as Palazzo della Curia or Palazzo Ceschi, has been the seat of the curia and the residence of the Archbishop of Trento since 1922. It dates from the 16th century.

== History ==
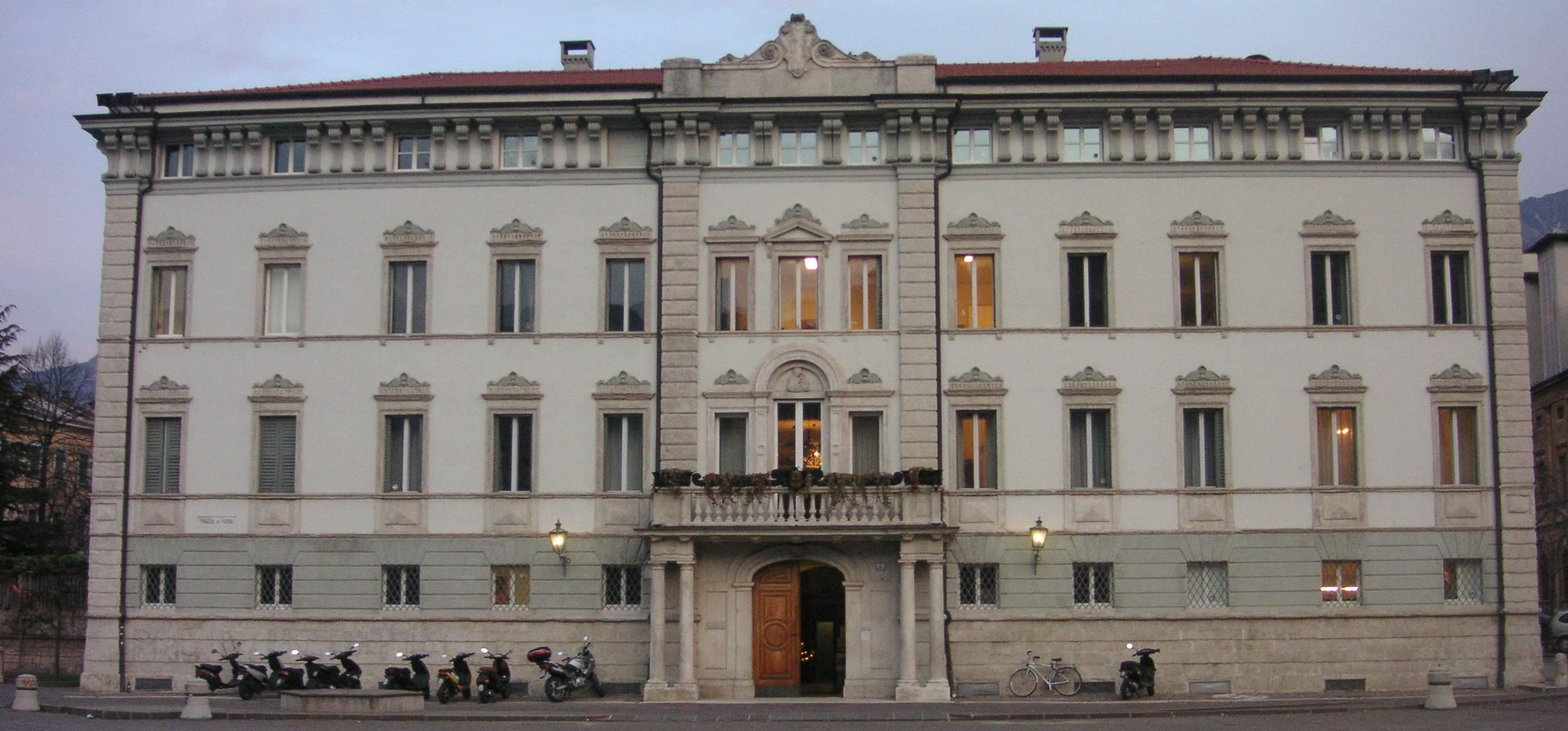
View of the palace in 2007.

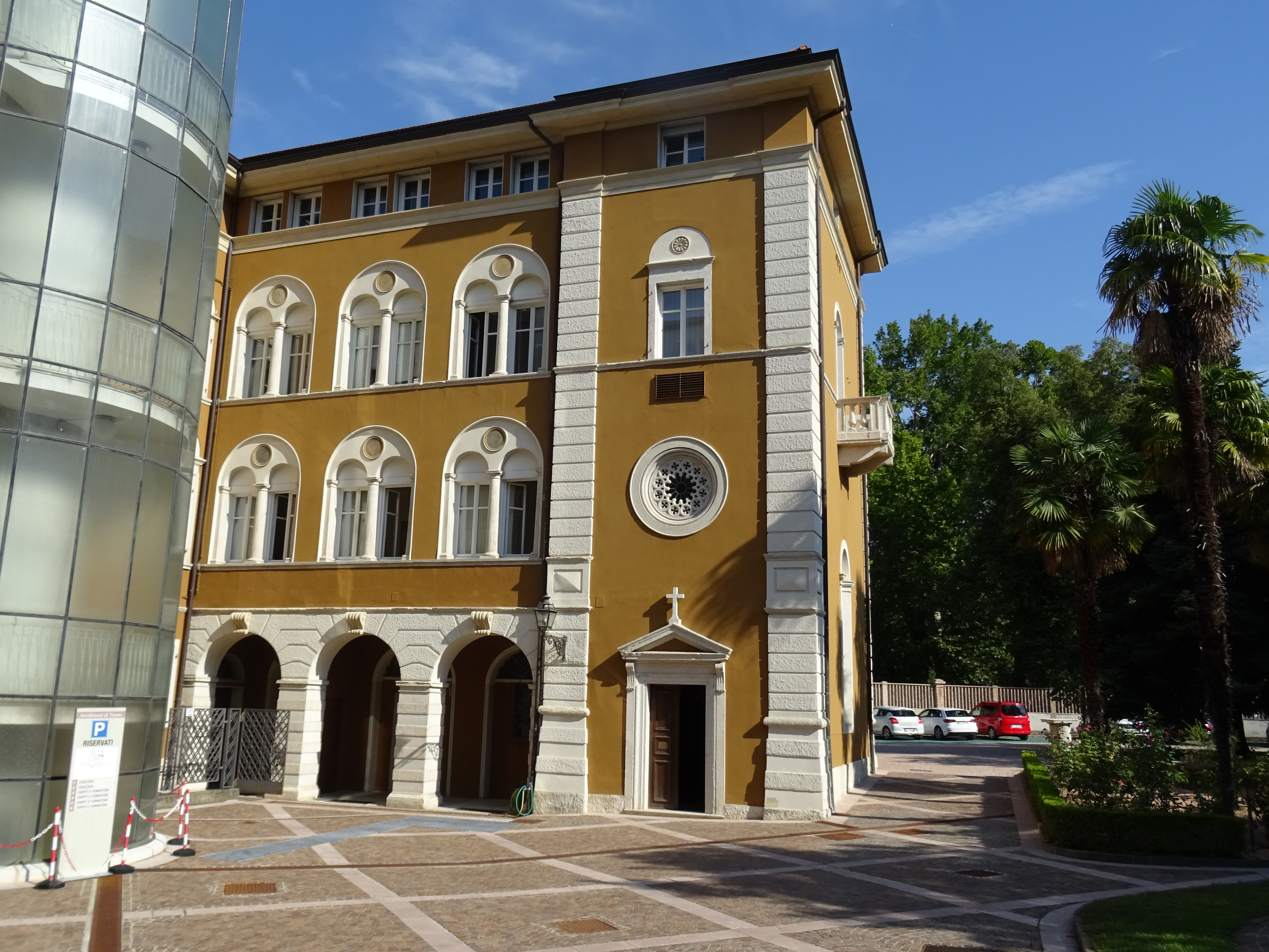
The chapel of St John the Baptist overlooking the inner courtyard

The first palace built on the site of the curia palace, belonging to the Pregrini family, dates back to the 16th century. In the first half of the 17th century, the property became the property of the prince-bishop Carlo Emanuele Madruzzo and later of the Particella family. In 1649, when the very young Maria Anna of Habsburg stopped in Trento on her way to Spain for her wedding to Filippo IV, a performance of the drama in music Aldna was organised in her honour in the palace. Around the end of the following century it was probably renovated or rebuilt. After various family vicissitudes, one of the heirs to the property was Ginevra de Zorzi, consort of the nobleman Marco Martinengo Cesaresco, but after his death the palace was left to the city's institute for the deaf and dumb until 1871, when it was bought by the barons Ceschi di Santa Croce.

Starting in 1872, the new owners decided to rebuild the palace, which was to be larger than its predecessor. The project was entrusted to Ignazio Liberi with the obligation to close the building site by 1874. The work, entrusted to a local firm, also included the large garden area and was completed in 1873. About fifty years later, in 1922, the palace became part of the property of the bishop's refectory of the diocese, which shortly afterwards moved both the seat of the curia and the residence of the Archbishop of Trento there, abandoning its previous seat in Piazza Vittoria. In 1929 some works were carried out on the façade, in particular the bas-relief depicting the Madonna and Child Jesus was placed in the lunette on the main window of the piano nobile.

A final round of conservation work was planned in 2011 with the aim of securing the degraded parts of the various façades and restoring the original colour of the Austro-Hungarian period, prior to its acquisition by the Trentino diocese. The works were completed in 2018.

== Description ==
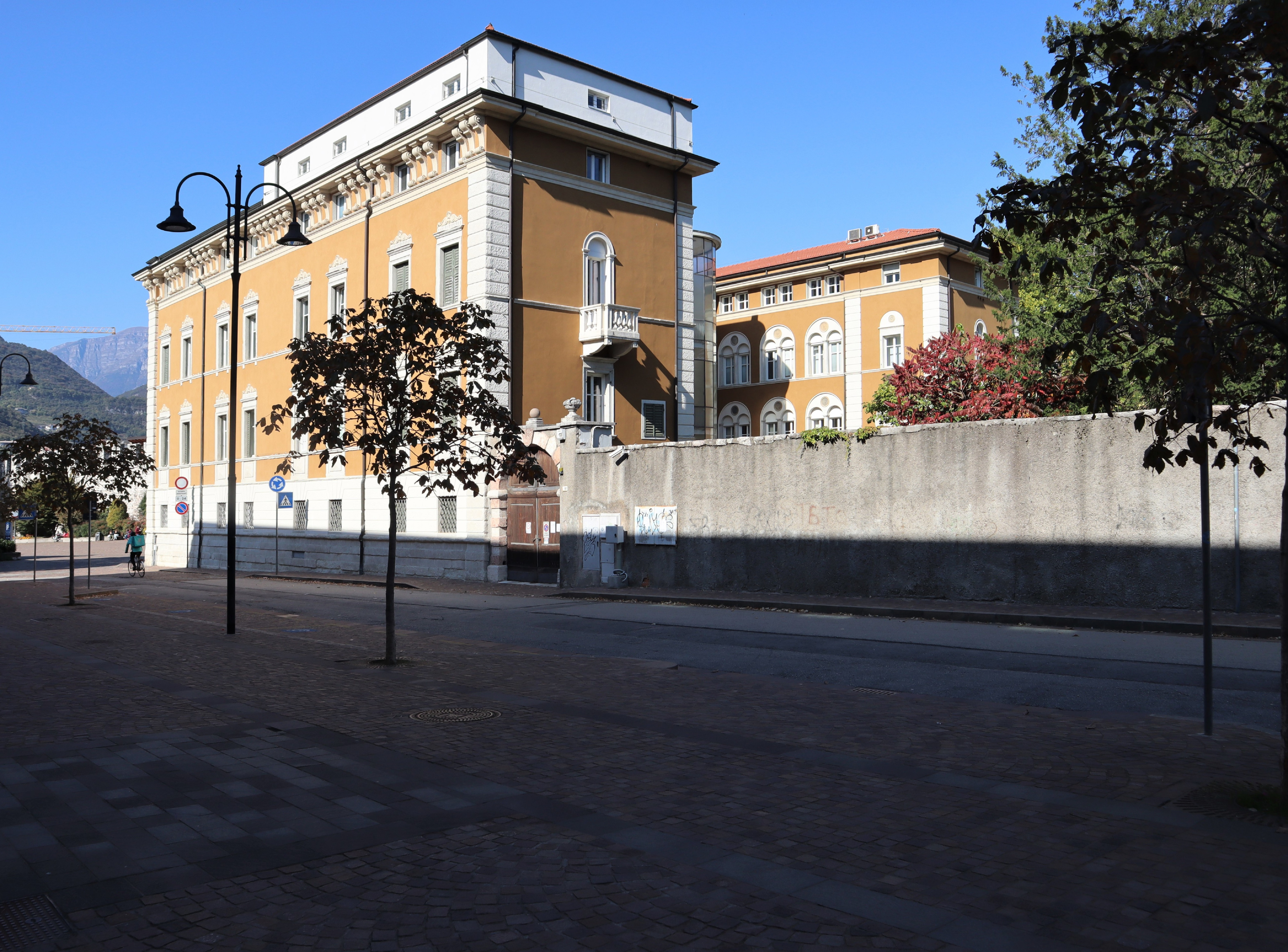
South elevation with garden fence wall

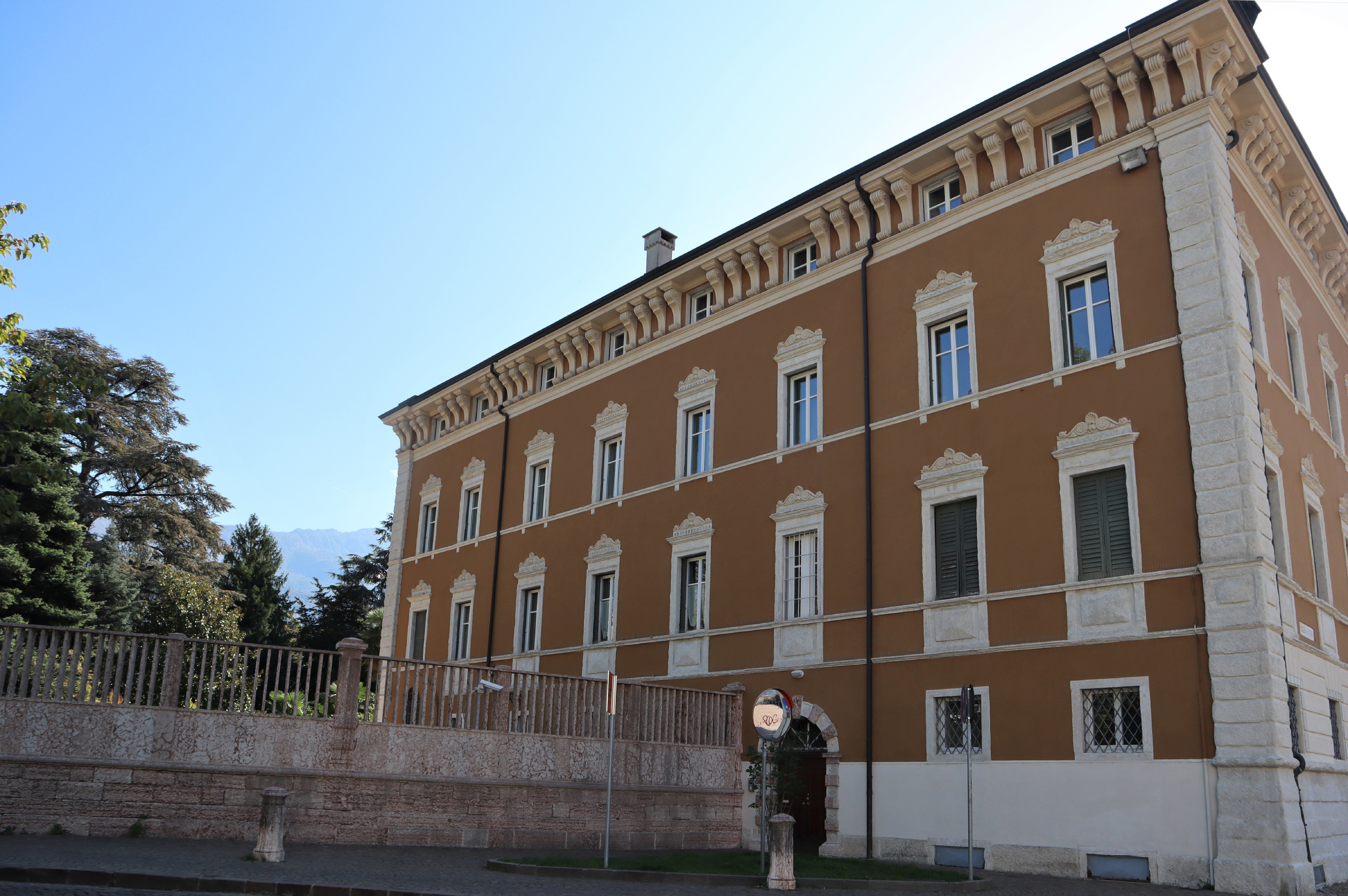
North elevation

=== Exteriors ===
The main façade of the palace faces the large Piazza di Fiera, with the two side wings facing Via San Giovanni Bosco and partly Via Francesco Barbacovi. The façade appears divided by two pilasters placed on the sides and two separating the central part with the large entrance portal with a stone cornice with a lowered arch under the large balcony. In the central section is the large portal with a lowered arch, surmounted by a balcony. The balcony, located on the piano nobile, is accessed through the serliana above which is a bas-relief sculpture of the Madonna and Child Jesus commissioned by Celestino Endrici. The central part culminates with a decorative motif of volutes and a shield in the centre. The summit pediment is formed by two volutes and a central shield. In the extensive garden is the chapel of St. John the Baptist and is accessed from the inner eastern façade, which in the centre, during the 20th century, had a large external staircase with a semi-cylindrical stained glass window inserted.

=== Interior ===
The main entrance leads to the atrium and from this to the grand staircase leading to the piano nobile and the upper floors.

- Main floor, archiepiscopal residence.
- Second and third floors, offices of the diocesan curia.

== Bibliography ==
=== Italian sources ===
- Carlo Schmidl, Martinelli, Simone, OCLC 8650171107. in Dizionario universale dei musicisti, Milano, Sonzogno, 1937–38, OCLC 10339224
