= Simone Mosca =

Italian sculptor

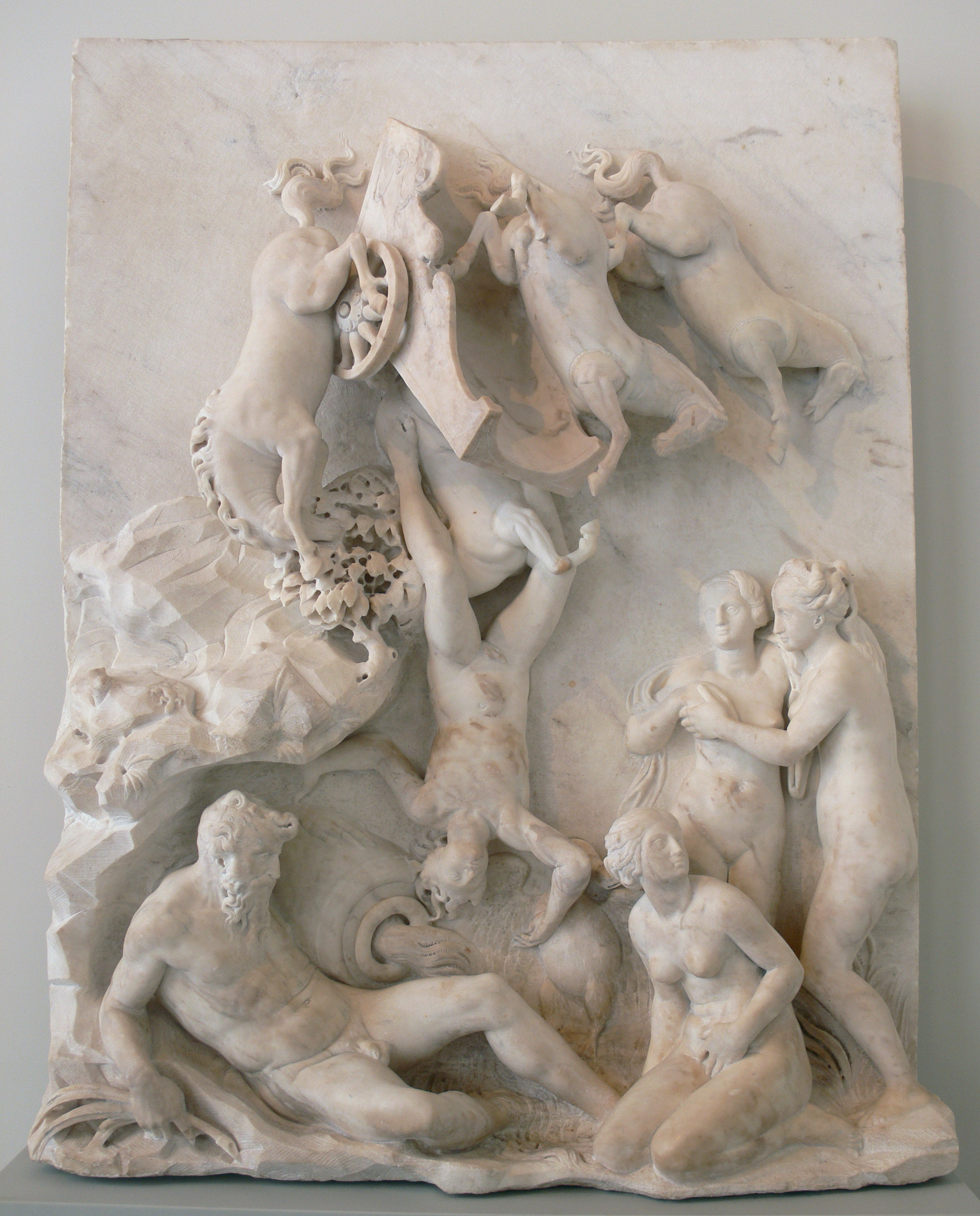
‘The Fall of Phaëton’, marble relief by Simone Mosca, Bode Museum, Berlin

Simone Mosca (1492–1554) was an Italian sculptor who was born in Settignano (part of Florence). His sons were sculptors Francesco Mosca, called Il Moschino (ca. 1531-1578) and Simone Simoncelli, also known as Simone Moschino (1533-1610). During the late 1520s and early 1530s Simone worked with Michelangelo on the Medici Chapel in Florence. A Venus by Francesco Moschino was described in 1782 in the Royal Palace of Turin.

Starting circa 1535, Mosca worked on sculptures for the Duomo of Orvieto, working alongside Raffaele da Montelupo. In 1542, he began to work on commissions by Tiberio Crispo, soon to cardinal, in the city of Perugia and in Bolsena. In 1546, he was named the maestro or director of construction for the Cathedral of Orvieto, replacing Antonio da Sangallo the younger. Simone Mosca died in Orvieto, Italy in 1554.
