= Tommaso Mattei =

Italian architect

Tommaso Mattei (Rome, 24 December 1652 - May 10 1726) was a 17th-century Italian architect. He was a pupil of Gianlorenzo Bernini and Carlo Rainaldi.

Among his designs are the 1693 "capella nuova del miracolo" at the basilica di S. Cristina (this chapel was built to house the Corporal of Bolsena) and the cappella Montioni in Santa Maria in Montesanto, Rome in 1687. He has also restored many ancient buildings, including the Santa Maria in Domnica in 1726 which was one of his last works.

He was buried in San Giuseppe a Capo le Case, Rome.
