= Monte Cimino =

Mountain in Lazio, Italy

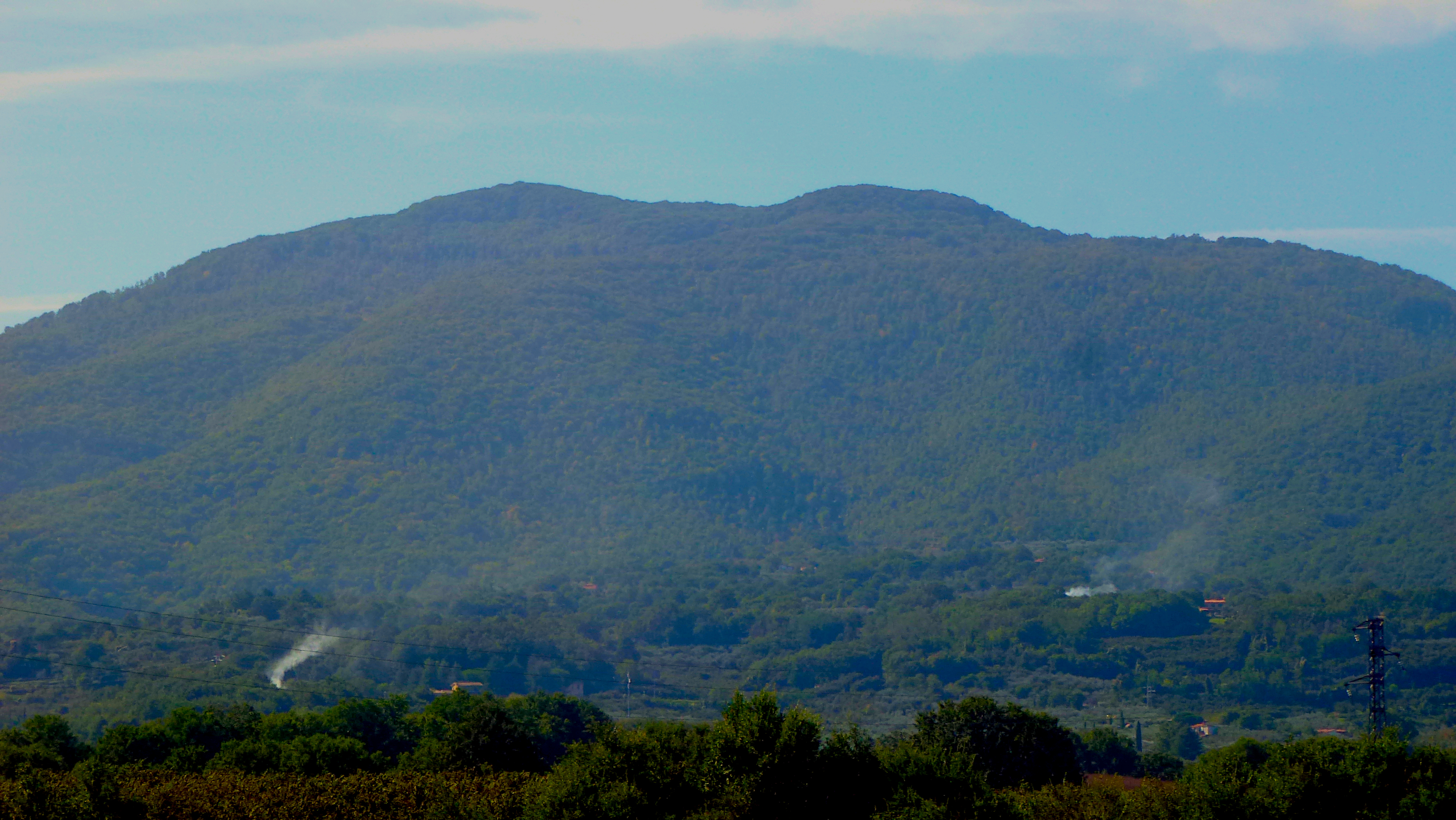

Highest point
- Elevation: 1,053 m (3,455 ft)
- Prominence: 765 m (2,510 ft)
- Coordinates: 42°24′28″N 12°12′04″E

Geography
- Location within Italy
- Country: Italy
- Province: Province of Viterbo
- Region: Lazio
- Parent range: Monti Cimini (in Lazio's Anti-Apennines)

Geology
- Last eruption: Pleistocene

Ancient and Primeval Beech Forests of the Carpathians and Other Regions of Europe
UNESCO World Heritage Site
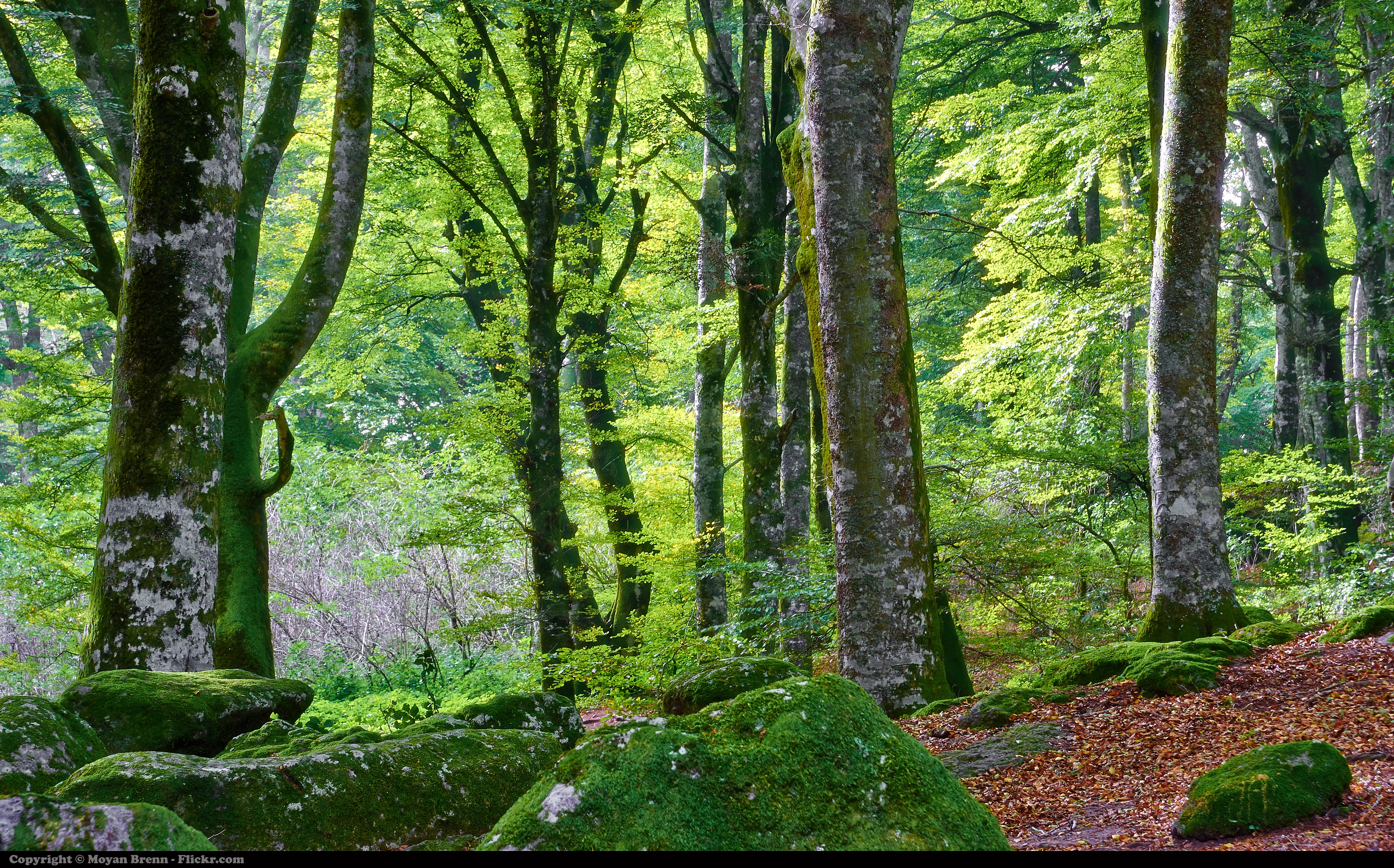
- Interactive map of Ancient and Primeval Beech Forests of the Carpathians and Other Regions of Europe
- Criteria: ix
- Reference: 1133
- Inscription: 2017 (41st Session)
- Endangered: Not in danger

Mount Cimino (1,053 m a.s.l.) is the highest peak in Lazio's Anti-Apennine chain of the Cimini Mountains, and in the entire province of Viterbo. It towers above the town of Soriano nel Cimino.

== Description ==
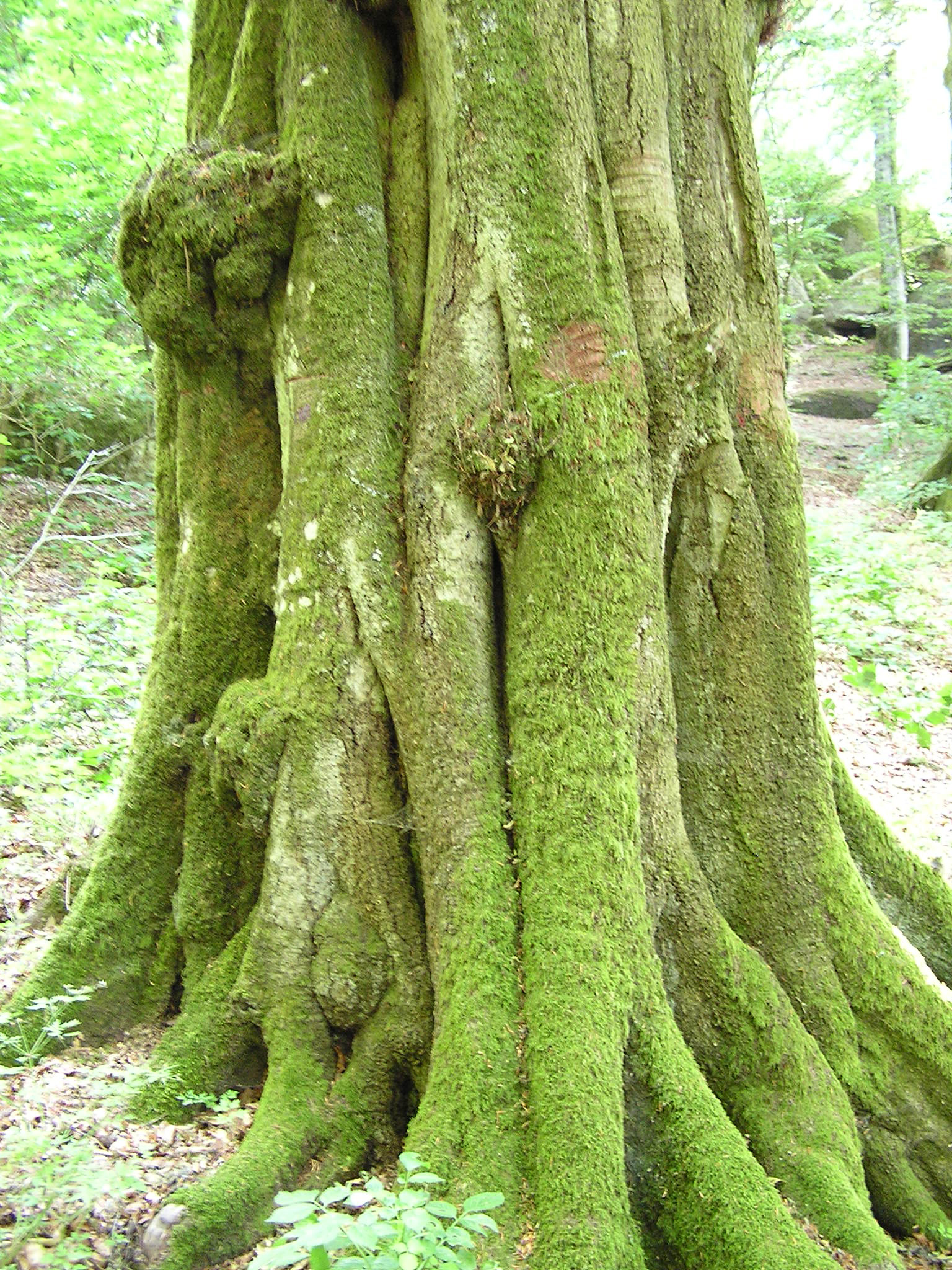
Detail of a beech tree.

The Old Beech Forest of Mount Cimino is located in the municipality of Soriano nel Cimino (VT) and has an extension of about 58 ha, between 925 and 1053 m a.s.l., and is among the most majestic and imposing in central Italy.

It is developed all around an easily accessible parking lot, at an altitude of 970 m above sea level, where it is possible to stop in the shade of beech trees on hot summer days and use the restaurant located nearby.

There is also a weather station, active since 2011 and restored in 2018, which records weather parameters on a daily basis.

From the top of the mountain the view, currently obstructed, especially in good weather, by tree vegetation, sweeps over the Tiber Valley and the surrounding towns: primarily Soriano nel Cimino, Vitorchiano, Bomarzo, Montefiascone and Bassano in Teverina; from the top of the tower located on the summit (currently not visitable as it houses numerous antennas and transmitters), on clear days it is possible to glimpse the dome of St. Peter's Basilica in Rome, Mount Cavo, the Latium coastline and the northwestern part of the Lepini mountain range. To the north it is possible to see Mount Amiata, to its right Mount Cetona and, in the distance, Mount Nerone.

=== Access ===
Due to the hiking network set up by the CAI section of Viterbo, it is possible to walk to the Beech Forest and the summit of Mount Cimino via three hiking trails.

Start	Route	Difficulty	Distance	Ascent	Descent	Notes
Soriano nel Cimino	CAI 03 Tappa 3	E	4,3 km	629 m	0 m	Departing from Soriano nel Cimino Station
Canepina	CAI 133BA and CAI 103 Tappa 3	E	9,3 km	700 m	0 m	
Strada Romana	123A	E	3,8 km	340 m	70 m	

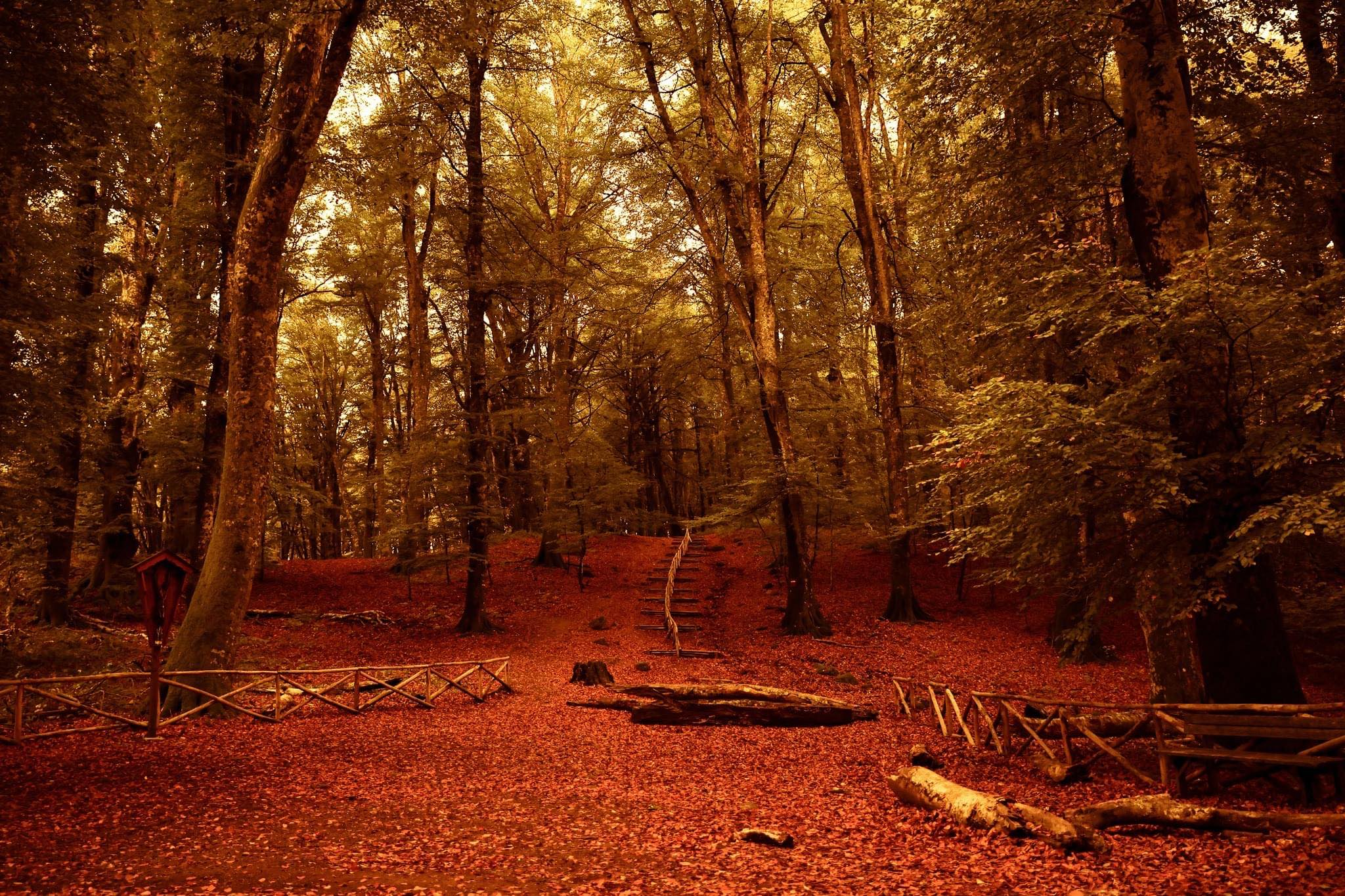
Old Beech Forest of Mount Cimino

== Volcanology ==
Mount Cimino is part of the larger phenomenon of volcanism that has affected the entire Tuscia area. In particular, the Cimino area (that of Mount Cimino) has an older age: its activity, in fact, is between 1.35 million and 800,000 years ago. During this wide interval of time, the ascent along the fractures of acid viscous magmas originated more than 50 easily recognizable hill reliefs (Palanzana, Montalto, San Valentino, Ciliano, and Soriano) all around Mount Cimino.

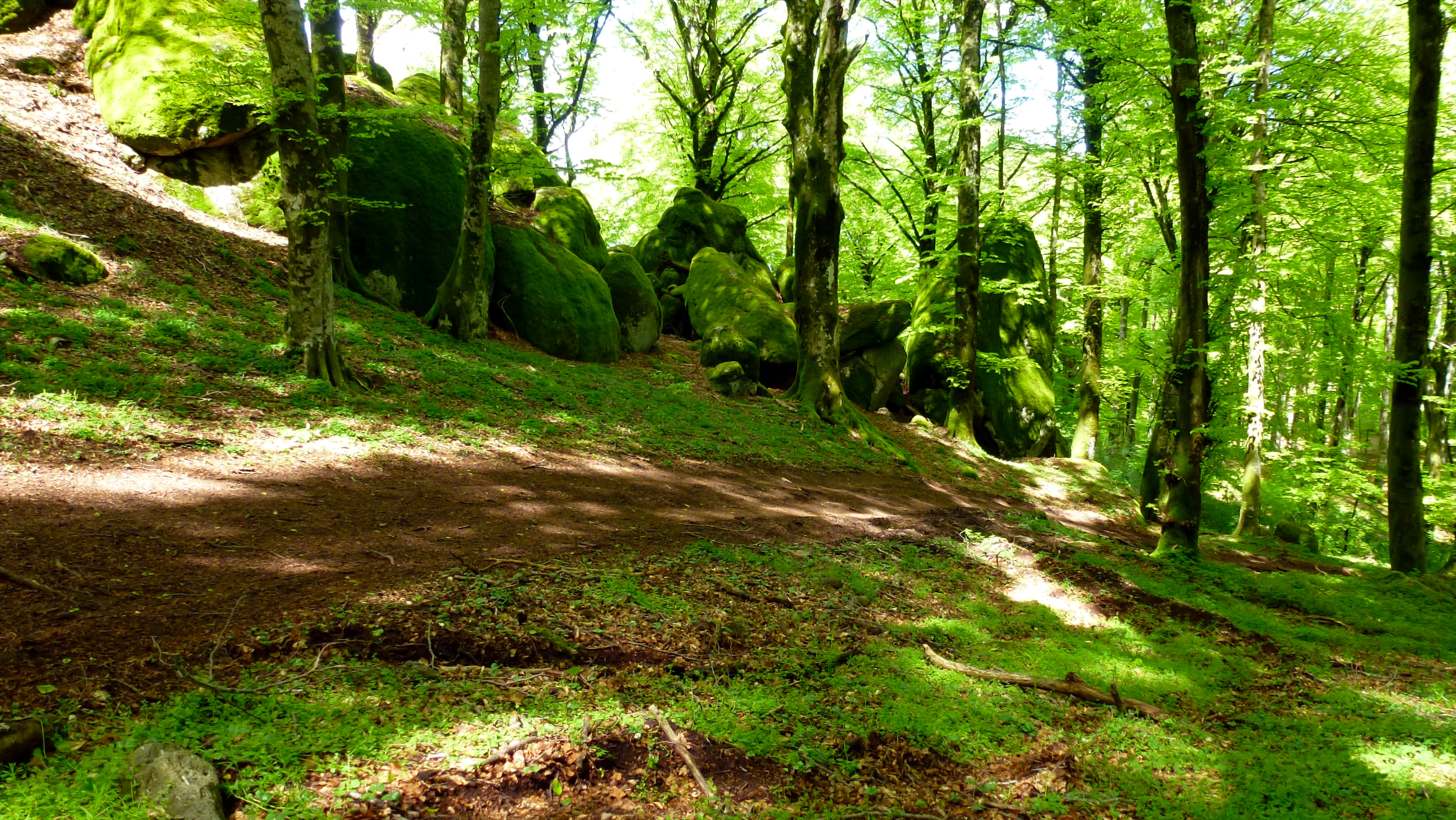
Trachytic boulders of different and varied sizes created by volcanic activity of quartz-latite lavas over a million years ago

== Bronze Age ==
The summit of the mount was occupied by an important Late Bronze Age settlement, of which the vast perimeter fortification, dating from the Final Bronze Age (c. 1150 BCE) and enclosing an area of about 50. 000 square meters; the vast artificial stone enclosure, possibly divided into two sectors, one of which includes an additional and smaller fortified area of about 5,000 square meters (near the modern tower), was identified by archaeologists as early as around 1890, but its scientific exploration has only been addressed since 1976.

Since 2009, the Ministry of Culture and Sapienza University of Rome have been conducting summer excavation campaigns in the protohistoric village; in addition to remarkable results concerning the knowledge of the community settled on Cimino in the Bronze Age, these researches have made it possible to identify two Etruscan phases of reoccupation of the area, with the building of a fort: the first phase, from the Archaic period (around 6th cent. BC), attests to the importance of the strategic possession of the summit during the prolonged and even conflictual dialectic between the Tyrrhenian metropolises; the second phase, on the other hand, can be put in direct relation with the wars waged by Rome against the Etruscans after the taking of Veii also documented by literary sources (4th century BC).

== Roman period ==
To the ancient Romans the "Silva Ciminia" appeared as a bleak, sacred and impassable place. It formed a very intricate forest belt that, due in part to the presence of volcanic rocks, helped keep Roman troops away for at least a couple of centuries, forcing Rome to expand toward southern Latium and Campania. Remains of ancient small temples probably dedicated to Jupiter Cimino have been found in the Cimini Mountains.

During the war against the Etruscans, it was crucial for the Romans led by Consul Quintus Fabius Maximus Rullianus to reach the top of the Cimini Mountains; in fact, this feat allowed them to catch a glimpse of the Etruscan settlements present in the Tiber valley that would later fall under the pressing Roman advance around 310 BC.

== The SAC - Special Area of Conservation ==
The Beech forest occupies the southernmost part of the SAC - Special Area of Conservation/SPA IT6010022 (northern slope) established by Regional Council Resolution No. 162 of April 14, 2016 and has an area of about 50 ha, equal to 5% of the site's area. By Regional Law No. 24 of December 27, 2008 the "management of the site" is entrusted to the Ente Monti Cimini - Lago di Vico Nature Reserve.

== UNESCO Recognition ==
On February 2, 2015 the beech forest was proposed, by the Italian permanent delegation to UNESCO, in the tentative list for inclusion among the World Natural Heritage sites (selection criterion (IX): "for being an outstanding example of significant course of ecological and biological processes in the evolution and development of terrestrial, freshwater, coastal and marine ecosystems and communities of marine plants and animals." On July 7, 2017, the World Heritage Committee, meeting in Krakow, recognized the Monte Cimino Beech Grove as a UNESCO World Natural Heritage Site by placing it on UNESCO's World Heritage List (ID. 1133ter-047).

== The trembling cliff ==
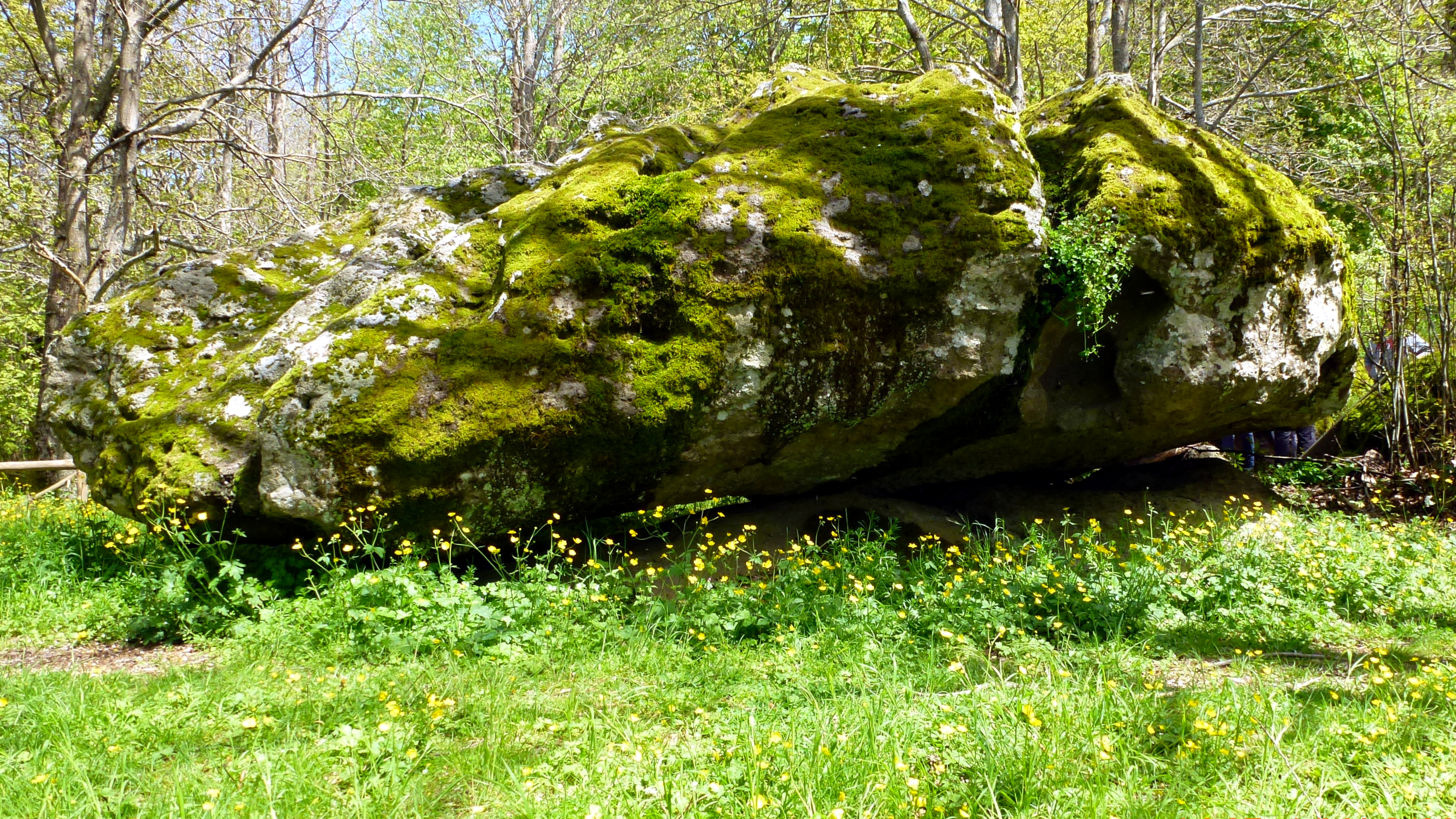
The trembling cliff

At the edge of the beech forest, in the part below the large parking lot, is the large trachyte boulder known as the trembling cliff or sasso menicante, better known to the locals as sasso naticarello (also attested are the ancient forms “sasso menicatore” and “sasso trenicatore”).

Celebrated as early as Pliny the Elder as naturae miraculum (miracle of nature) in his Naturalis historia, it is a large ovoid-shaped boulder about 8 meters long, 6 meters wide and 3 meters high, with a volume of about 100 m³ and weighing about 250 tons, hanging balanced on a rocky ledge in the ground, a feature that means that it can be swung sensitively and quite smoothly using a large stick as a lever.

It represents one of the many boulders erupted by the Cimino volcano during its phase of maximum activity and gives insight into what magnitude and strength the Cimino had during its eruptions.

== Sports ==
Many sports are practiced on the many trails within the beech forest, including: hiking, trekking, running, mountain biking, downhill mountain biking and bouldering. An ordinance of the municipality of Soriano nel Cimino prohibits the use of mountain bikes at the summit of the mountain to preserve the fragile underbrush substrate.

Mount Cimino has been the arrival site for two stages of the Tirreno Adriatico: stage five in 1995, won by Gianluca Pierobon, and stage four in 1996, won by Filippo Casagrande.

== Film sets ==
The beech forest has been the set of a number of films, including Mario Monicelli's Il Marchese del Grillo (1981), Richard Fleischer's Red Sonja (1985), Mario Monicelli's For Love and Gold (1966), Liliana Cavani's Francesco (1989 film and 2014 television series), Freaks Out (2021) by Gabriele Mainetti, Teresa the Thief (1973) by Carlo di Palma, La Befana vien di notte 2 - Le origini (2021) by Paola Randi, Le Nuove Comiche (1994) by Neri Parenti, That Night in Varennes (1982) by Ettore Scola, The Name of the Rose (2019 TV series) by Giacomo Battiato.

== See also ==
- Monti Cimini
- Lake Vico
- Ancient and Primeval Beech Forests of the Carpathians and Other Regions of Europe

== Bibliography ==
- Alessandro Alessandrini; Silvia Blasi; Alfredo Di Filippo; Gianluca Piovesan; Emanuele Ziaco (2008). Alla scoperta di una foresta vetusta: la faggeta di Soriano nel Cimino. Il sentiero Natura (PDF). Viterbo: Sette Città. ISBN 978-88-7853-130-7. OCLC 722328572 – via DSpace-CRIS.
- Alfredo Di Filippo (17 October 2007). Gianluca Piovesan (ed.). Studio per una classificazione fitoclimatica delle faggete italiane su base dendroecologica (PDF). Tesi di Dottorato di Ricerca. 18. Ciclo (Thesis). Viterbo: Università degli studi della Tuscia.
- Michele Baliva (27 May 2013). Rosanna Bellarosa (ed.). Effetti delle variazioni climatiche e dell'impatto antropico su crescita e livelli di discriminazione isotopica del carbonio in una rete di faggete italiane (PDF). Tesi di Dottorato di Ricerca. 25. Ciclo (Thesis). Viterbo: Università degli studi della Tuscia.
