= Bassano in Teverina =

- Comune
- Comune di Bassano in Teverina
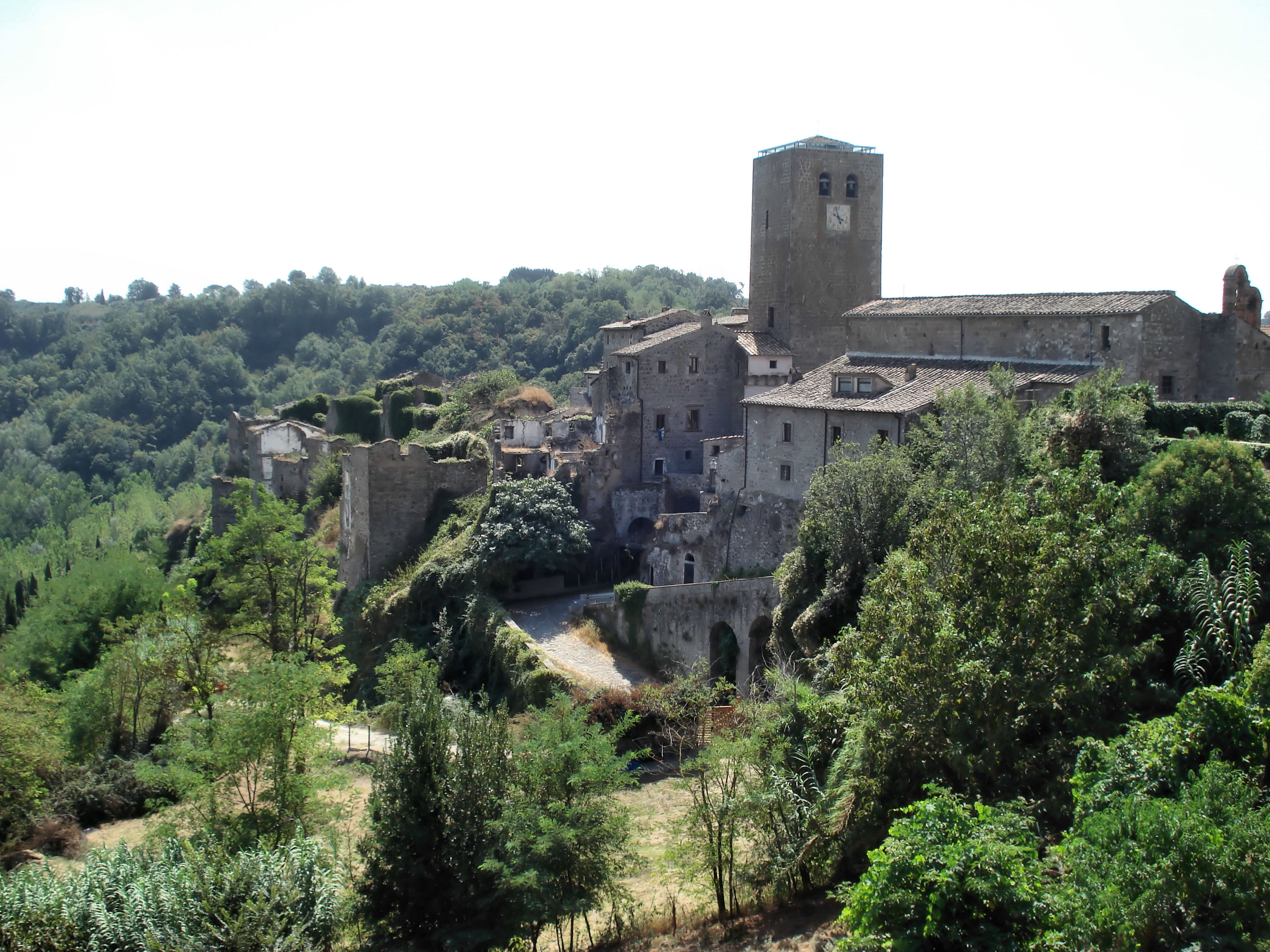

- Coat of arms

- Location within Italy Location within Lazio
- Coordinates: 42°27′50″N 12°18′30″E
- Country: Italy
- Region: Lazio
- Province: Viterbo (VT)

Government
  - Mayor: Alessandro Romoli

Area
  - Total: 12.1 km^{2} (4.7 sq mi)
- Elevation: 304 m (997 ft)

Population (30 April 2017)
  - Total: 1,291
  - Density: 107/km^{2} (276/sq mi)
- Demonym: Bassanesi
- Time zone: UTC+1 (CET)
  - Summer (DST): UTC+2 (CEST)
- Postal code: 01030
- Dialing code: 0761
- Patron saint: Sts. Fidentius and Terentius
- Saint day: 27 September
- Website: Official website

Bassano in Teverina is a comune (municipality) in the Province of Viterbo in the Italian region of Latium. It is inhabited by 1,332 people and is located about 90 kilometres (56 mi) north of Rome and about 20 kilometres (12 mi) northeast of Viterbo. It is one of I Borghi più belli d'Italia ("The most beautiful villages of Italy").

== Geography ==
Bassano in Teverina lies on the border between Lazio and Umbria and is situated in a position which overlooks the Tiber Valley, on the last offshoots north of the Cimini Hills.

== History ==
The origin of the town is extremely uncertain. The ending of the name, derived from the Latin adjectival suffix -anus, dates back to Roman times and, together with the root of the name, seems to remember the family name (Bassus) of a character who owned large estates in the area: Bassus> Bassanus> Bassano.

The town center of Bassano in Teverina arises on a tuff spur set in a slightly rearward position compared to the Tiber Valley, of which it overlooks one part. Its location, hidden by the surrounding hillocks, does not allow the visibility of neighboring locations such as Mugnano, Attigliano, Chia and Bomarzo. However, a system of sighting and communication must have existed through the hillocks Sasso Quadro (324 m above sea level) and Poggio Zucco (318 m above sea level), directly connected to Bassano through old paths as well as locations of ancient settlements, as remains of buildings prove.

Downstream from the city center, not far away from the Tiber, lies Lake Vadimo, locally known as the "Pond", described by Pliny the Younger as "a lying wheel with a regular circumference [...] paler, greener and more intense than the sea." Today the lake is partially dry and is fed by sulphurous springs which, along with marsh vegetation and mineral sediments, create masses of a certain size that must have suggested the idea of the "floating islands" mentioned by some Latin authors. In Roman times the lake, called Lacus Vladimonis, besides being larger was also considered sacred: near its shores, the Etruscans performed rituals and periodic celebrations, while in its waters the Romans immersed their weapons to make them invincible.

Built on the Cimini Hills slopes, Bassano was a necessary step in the way from Soriano to the Tiber, and also exercised a strategic function on the valley. The little center was already inhabited in Etruscan times but was abandoned during the domination of Romans, who conquered the whole surrounding area, taking the territory thanks to two bloody battles: the first in 309 BC, under the leadership of the consul Quintus Fabius Rullianus, and the second in 283 BC, with which they finally defeated Etruscans and Senones (a Gallic population who had previously occupied the territory). According to a legend, on that occasion, Tiber's waters turned red and took with them the enemy's bodies, announcing the victory to Rome. Once they took possession of the place, the Romans, in order to consolidate the dominion over the Etruscans and to monitor the navigation on Tiber, founded on these hills a castrum, identified with the name of Castrum Amerinum (it's believed to be the actual Palazzolo of Vasanello), according to a topographic map realized by the Mattei family in the second half of the seventeenth century. The site was recovered between the ninth and tenth centuries when, under the threat of the Hungarians, it took importance again for the easily defensible location thanks to its proximity to the Via Amerina, an old Roman road still in use at that time.

The name of Bassano in Teverina appears for the first time in the eleventh century. According to the tradition, the Countess Matilda of Canossa, the owner of large properties in Viterbo, donated Bassano's castle and other places in the area to Pope Gregory VII in 1070. As evidence of this, there is also a bull written by Innocent III dating back to 1212, in which it is asserted that on that date the estate was already belonging to the Apostolic Chamber. The town, therefore, found itself always under the protection of the Church, protected from attacks by the powerful nearby town, especially Orte's.

Between 1298 and 1377 the town became a municipality, but always under the Holy See's dependence. In 1437 the Diocese of Orte, to which Bassano belonged, was combined with the Civita Castellana one. In 1527, Pope Clement VII gave the estate to the Neapolitan nobleman Alfonso Lagne, after whose death it went back again to the Apostolic Chamber. In 1559, the complex was sold by Pope Pius IV to Cardinal Cristoforo Madruzzo, to his brother Nicola and to his nephew Fortunato. Twenty years later, Fortunato's brother in law, Cardinal Marco Sittico Altemps, bought the estate and ordered the construction of his palace, but at the end of the sixteenth century the territory was finally delivered into the hands of the Apostolic Chamber, who worked on it for many years to come. In 1929 the town of Bassano, weak and small, was combined to Orte and became independent again only in 1958. On 25 November 1943, during the Second World War, it was severely damaged by a tremendous explosion that shook the area: a German munition loaded train parked below the station blew up, causing a windage that destroyed roofs and walls of the town's ancient hamlet, forcing people to abandon it and making it uninhabitable for many decades.

In the last few decades, the hamlet has been involved in a series of recovery interventions and 31 housings have been restored thanks to public initiatives. In 2002 it was decided to consolidate the tuff cliff on which a large part of the hamlet rests.

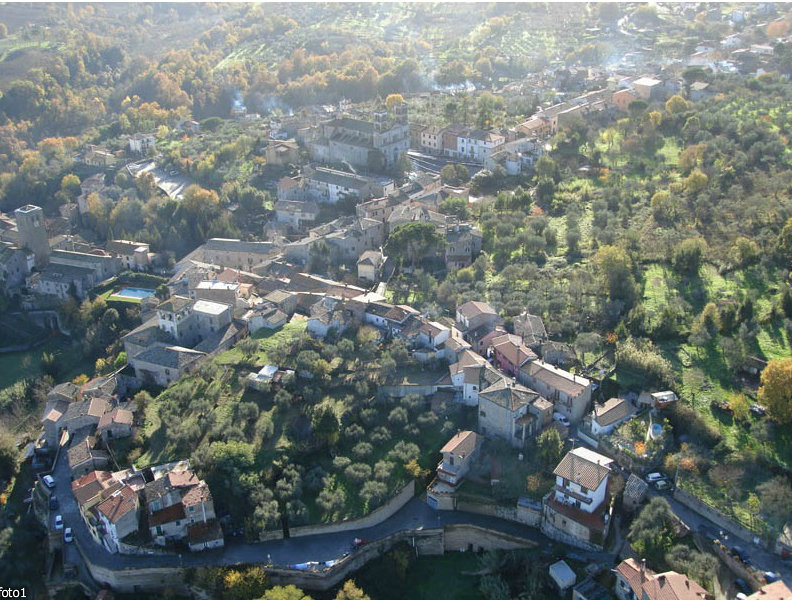
Overview of Bassano in Teverina

== Points of interest ==
1. Church of Santa Maria dei Lumi
2. Clock Tower
3. Church of Immaculate Conception
4. Church of Saints Fidenzio and Terenzio
5. Church of Madonna della Quercia
6. Old Fountain
7. Old Churches of Saint Biagio and Saint Anna
8. Amphitheater Giovanni Paolo II
9. Poggio Zucco and Sasso Quadro

== Society ==
=== Twinning ===
Bassano in Teverina is twinned with Lagardelle-sur-Lèze.

=== Sport ===
Bassano in Teverina's football team is ASD Sporting Bassano in Teverina, which plays in Viterbo championship, third category, group B.

== Photogallery ==
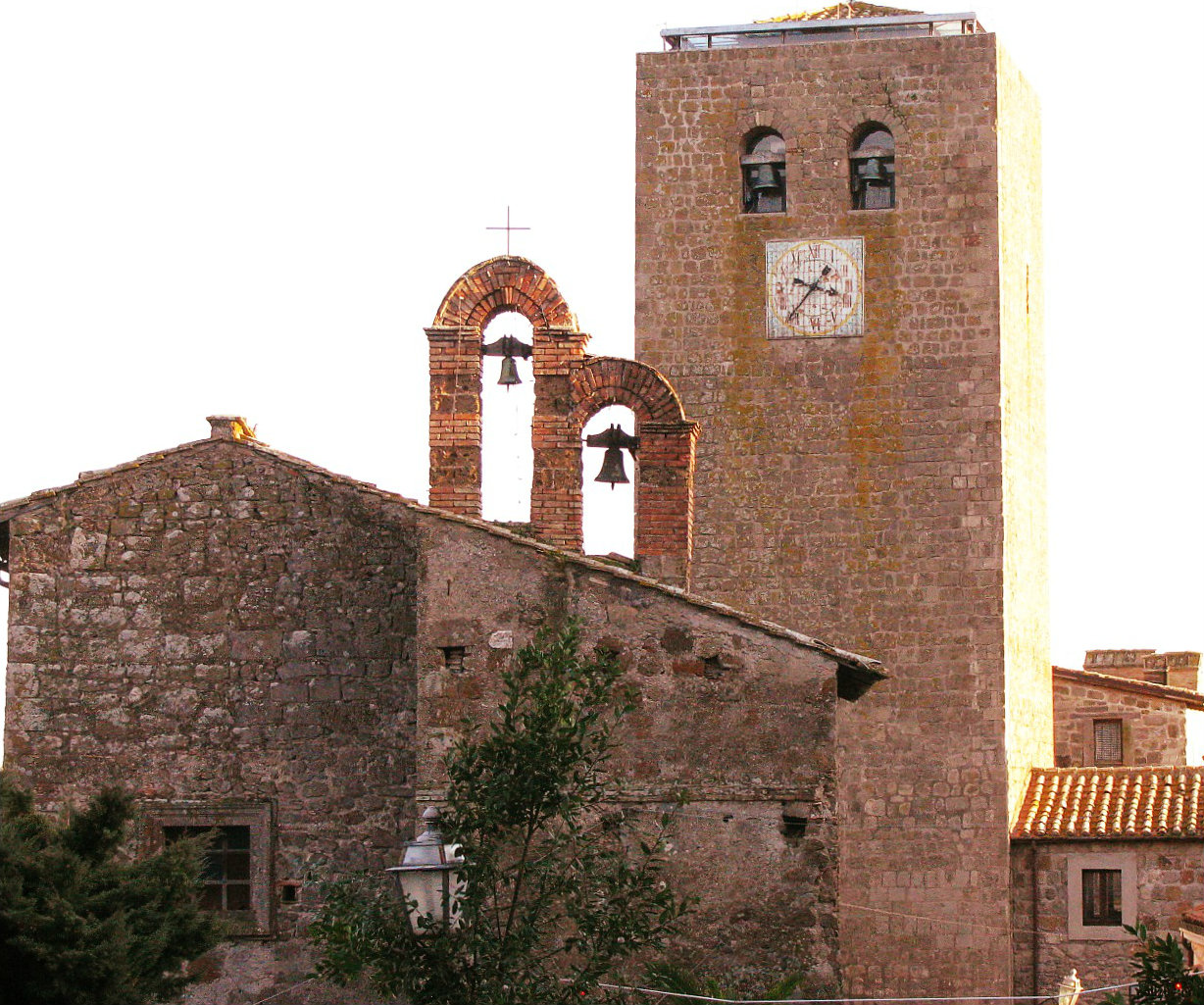
Church of Santa Maria dei Lumi and Clock Tower

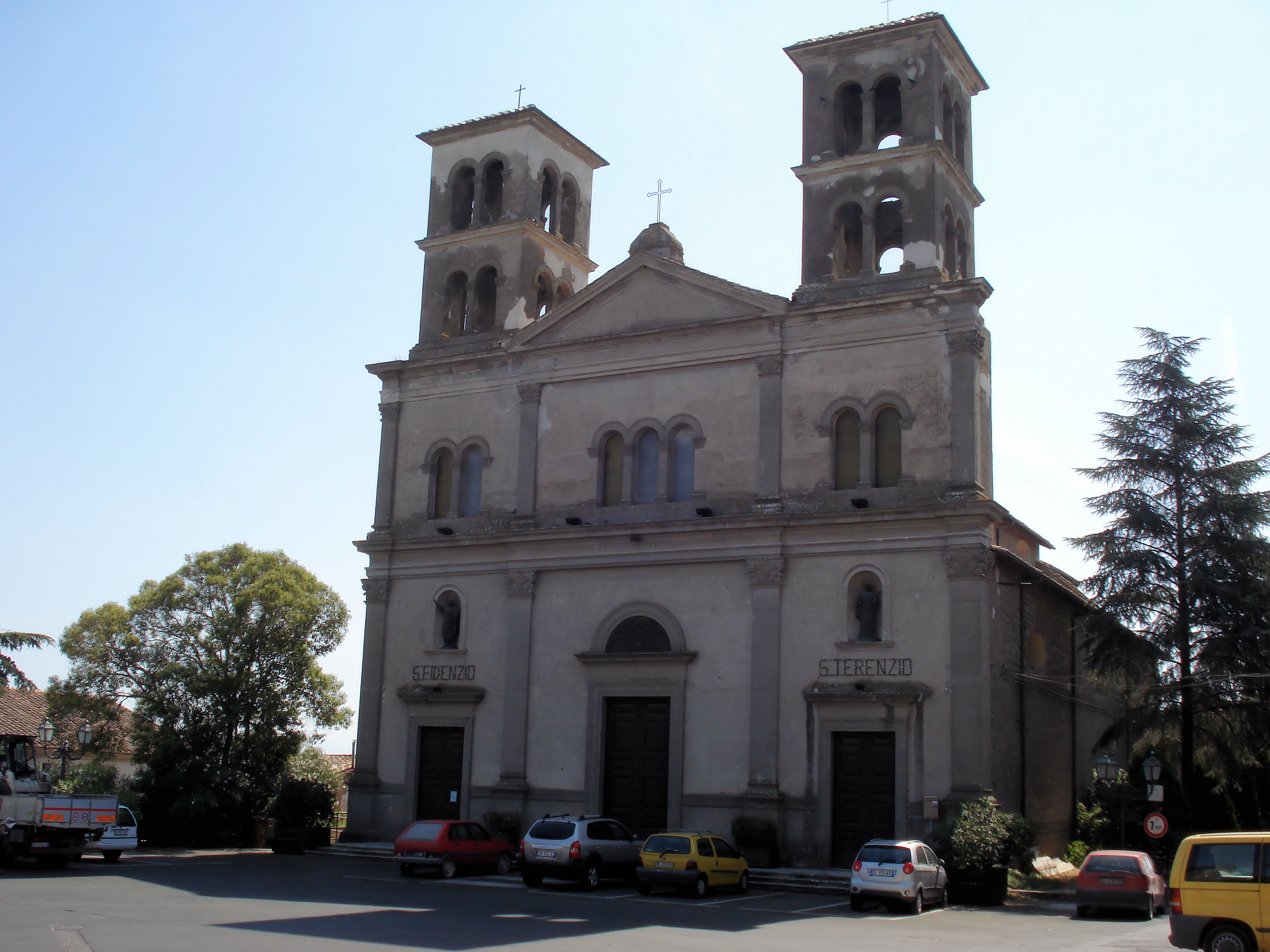
Church of Immacolata Concezione

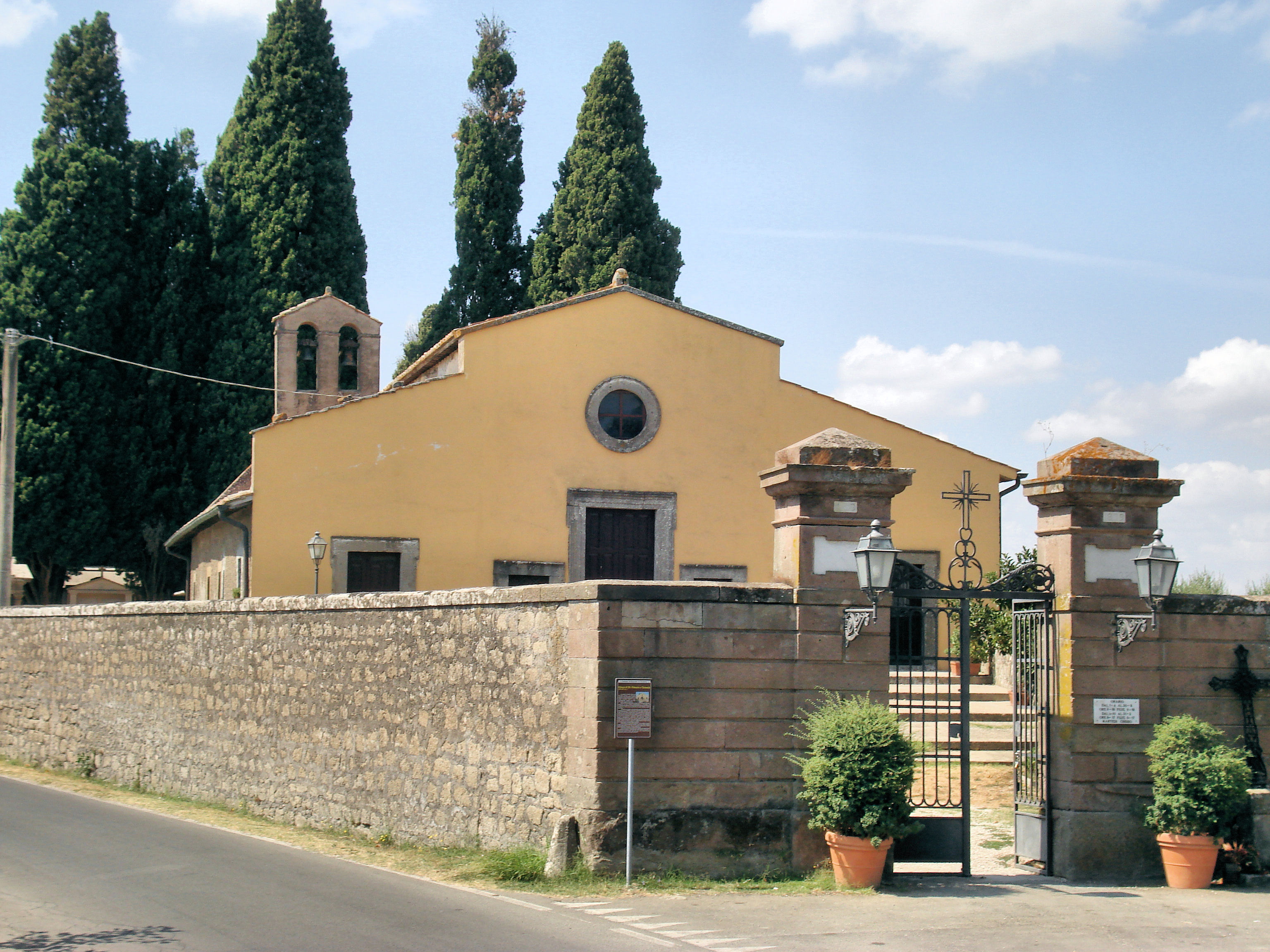
Church of Saints Fidenzio and Terenzio

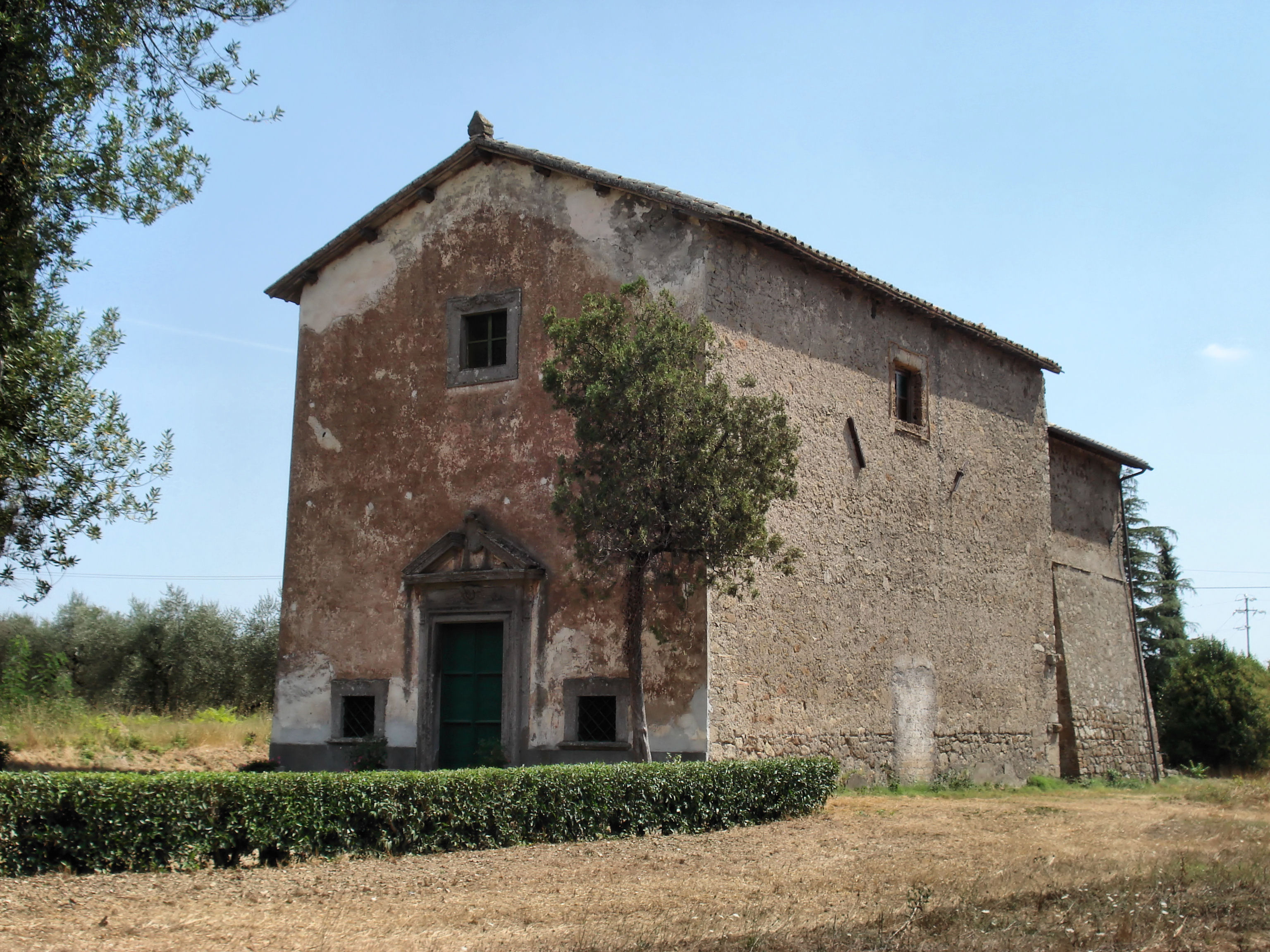
Church of Madonna della Quercia

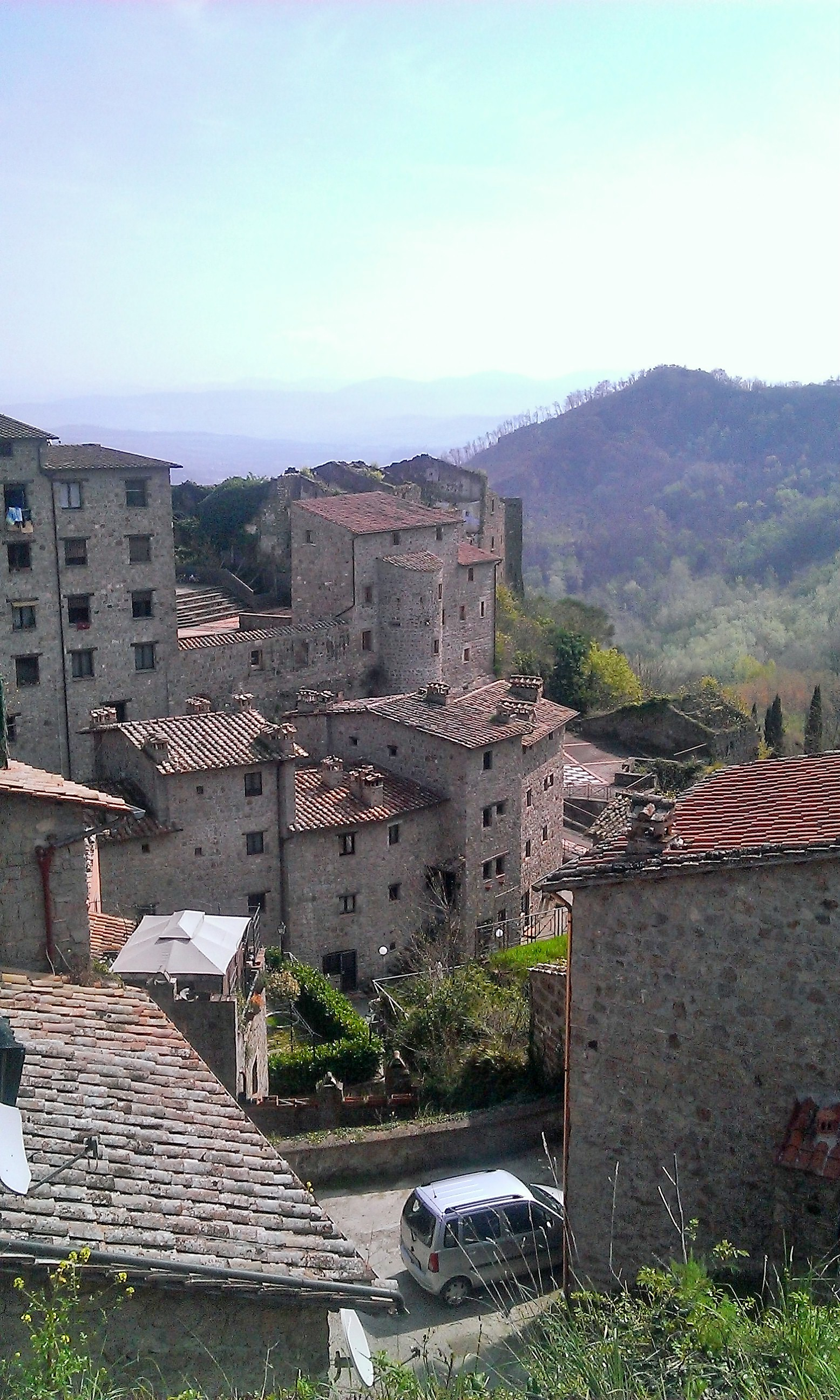
The old hamlet
