= Santa Maria dei Lumi =

Church building in Italy

Church of Santa Maria dei Lumi
- Chiesa di Santa Maria dei Lumi
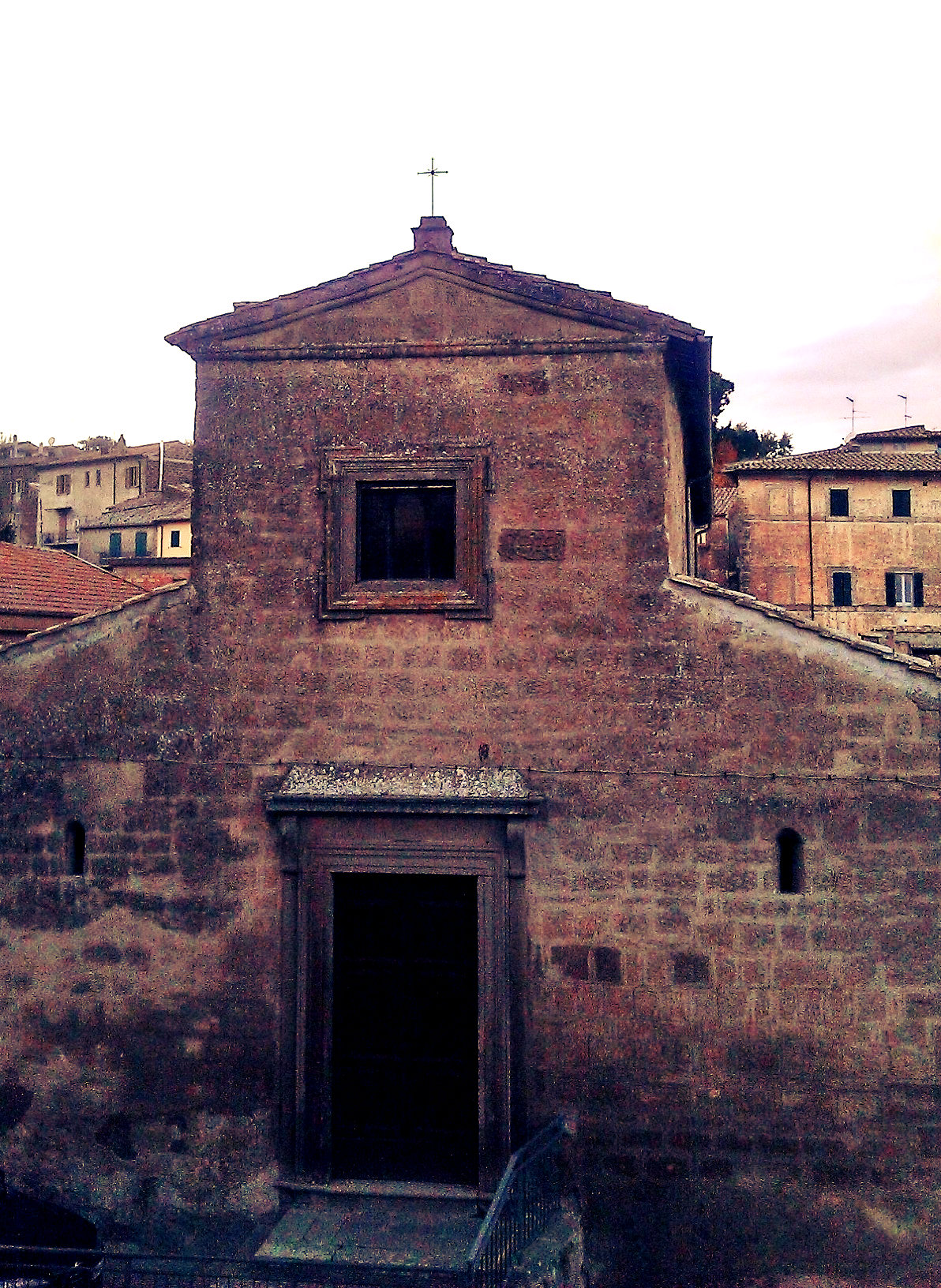
- The façade

Religion
- Affiliation: Catholic
- Province: Viterbo
- Region: Latium
- Rite: Catholicism
- Patron: Saint Mary
- Year consecrated: 11th-13th centuries

Location
- Location: Bassano in Teverina, Province of Viterbo
- State: Italy
- Interactive map of Church of Santa Maria dei Lumi
- Coordinates: 42°28′00″N 12°18′55″E

Architecture
- Style: Romanesque

Specifications
- Direction of façade: East
- Materials: Peperino

Santa Maria dei Lumi is the former Roman Catholic parish church of Bassano in Teverina (VT); it is located next to the town's ancient hamlet entrance.

== History ==
It was built between 1100 and 1200 AD. The first mention of the church has been found in an old document called Regesto di Farfa, kept in the Vatican Library in Rome.

Because of its narrowness, together with a gradual population increase, the church fell into disuse in 1855, when a new church dedicated to the Immaculate Conception was built; for a certain time, after 1870, it lost its sacredness and was often granted for many different uses such as polling place, granary and hospital.

It was rescued from this state of neglect in 1928, when restoration works were carried out, as evidenced by the plaque placed in the counterfacade. In February 1929, the church was reconsecrated and reopened to worship. Recently (1976-1984), thanks to restoration works carried out by the Superintendence for environmental and architectural heritage of Latium, it was discovered that the church features a big bell tower too (dating back to the twelfth century just like the church) which was hidden inside the Renaissance tower located about 12 meters from the church itself.

== Interior ==
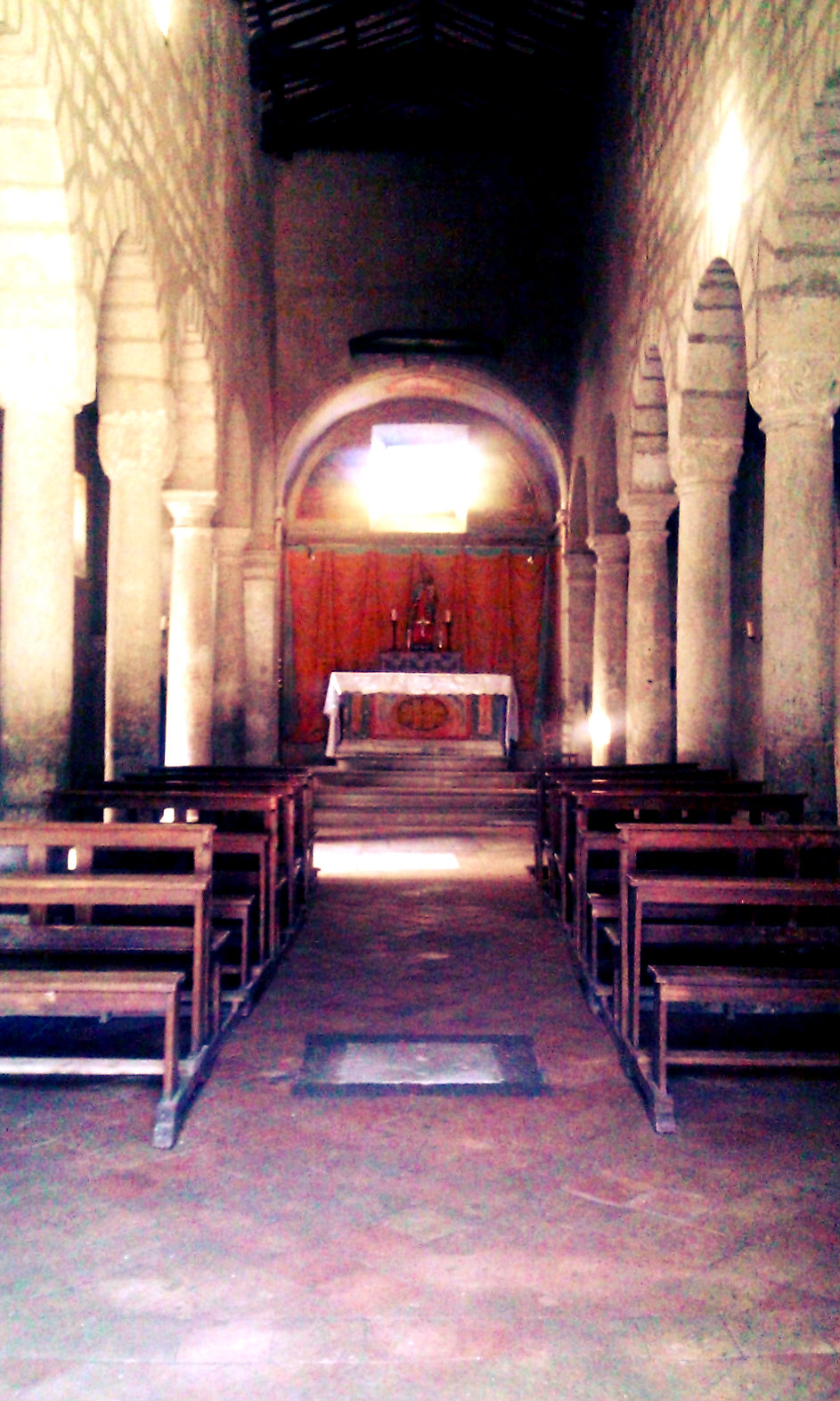
The interior of the church

The church is entirely made of peperino blocks and finds itself in front of the hamlet's front door. It has a basilica structure and, on the inside, presents a trussed roof with terracotta flat tiles (decorated with lilies and rhombuses) and three naves divided into two rows of six columns connected together with arches. The apse, rectangular in shape, is located on top of some steps; in the penultimate span of the aisle on the right there is a small square plant chapel with a small altar and a lowered cross vault.

The building, clearly Romanesque, is the result of renovations that continued for centuries. According to critics, originally the church must have had three naves ending with three apses, separated by rows of four columns on each side. However, due to renovation works (probably to increase the church's capacity), between the sixteenth and seventeenth centuries, they built the apse, the small chapel and the last two spans toward the apse, to which the columns correspond, different from the others both in the shaft and in the capitals (Tuscan order).

According to historians, the paintings inside the church date back to this period as well. In fact, inside the church three paintings can be admired: one depicts the Baptism of Jesus, another one depicts St. Anthony the Abbot and the third one depicts the Crucifixion.

== Other pictures ==
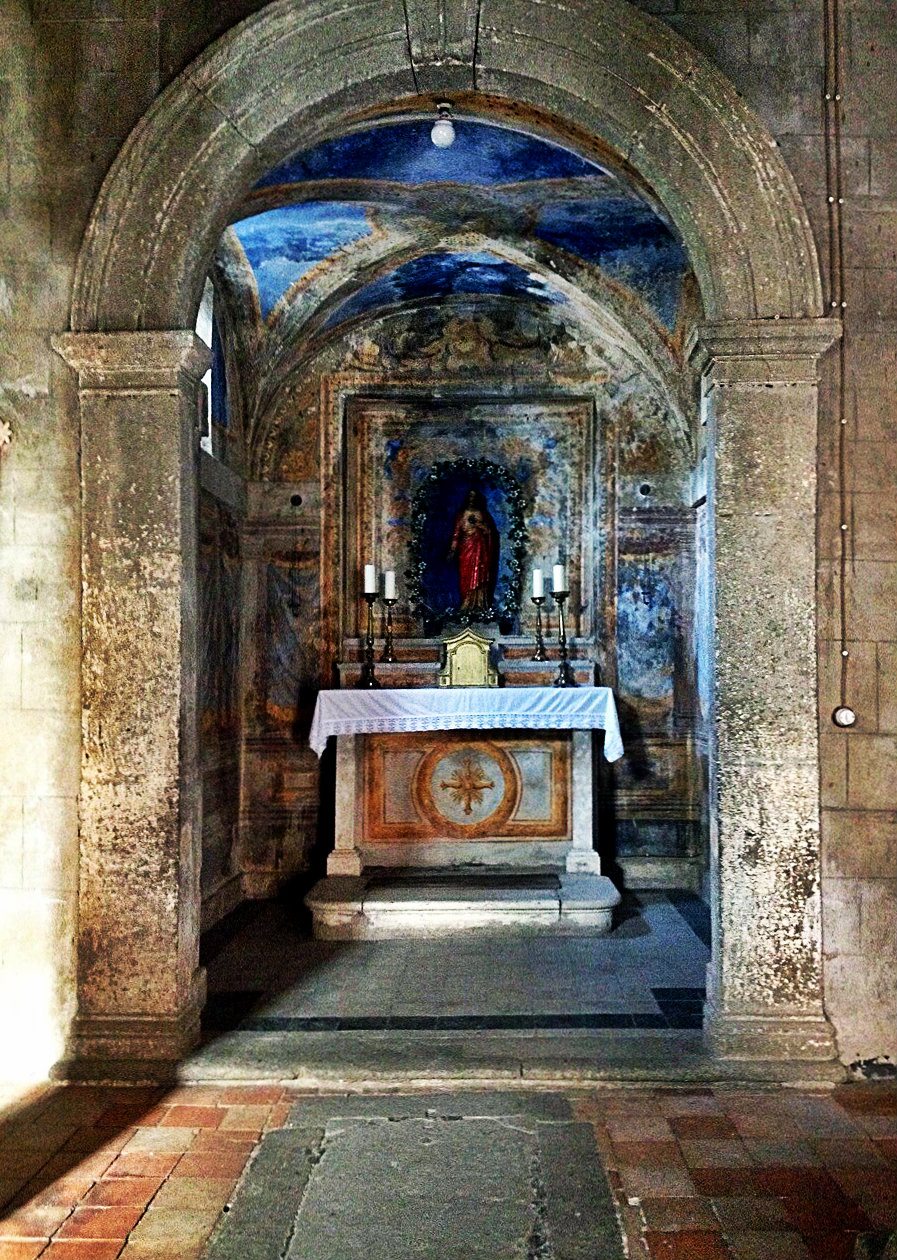
The chapel on the left

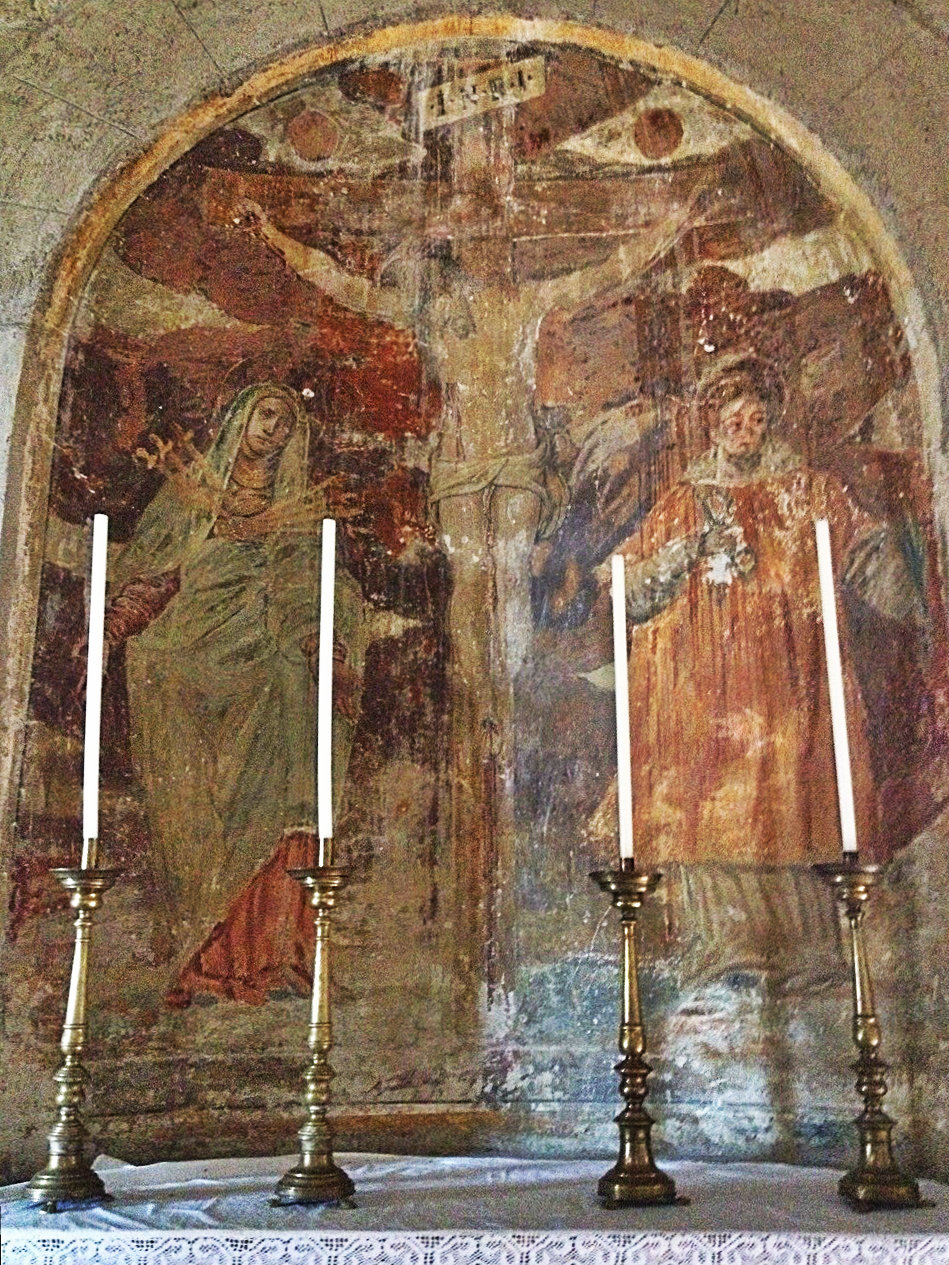
Painting depicting the Crucifixion of Jesus
