= Alessandro Romoli =

Italian politician (born 1984)

President of the Province of Viterbo
- Incumbent
- Assumed office 19 December 2021
- Preceded by: Pietro Nocchi

Mayor of Bassano in Teverina
- Incumbent
- Assumed office 8 June 2009
- Preceded by: Carlo Piccialuti

Personal details
- Born: 25 November 1984 (age 41) Rome, Lazio, Italy
- Party: Forza Italia

Alessandro Romoli (born 25 November 1984) is an Italian politician serving as president of the Province of Viterbo since 2021. He has served as mayor of Bassano in Teverina since 2009.

In the 2021 provincial election, Romoli, supported by Forza Italia and the Democratic Party, was elected president of the Province of Viterbo with 65% of the weighted vote, defeating Alessandro Giulivi, mayor of Tarquinia. He was re-elected provincial president in December 2025, with the support of a cross-party coalition including Forza Italia, Brothers of Italy, Lega, the Democratic Party and the civic movement Viterbo 2020.
