= List of mayors of Viterbo =

Mayor of Viterbo
- Sindaco di Viterbo
- Incumbent; Chiara Frontini since 27 June 2022
- Appointer: Popular election
- Term length: 5 years, renewable once
- Formation: 1870
- Website: Official website

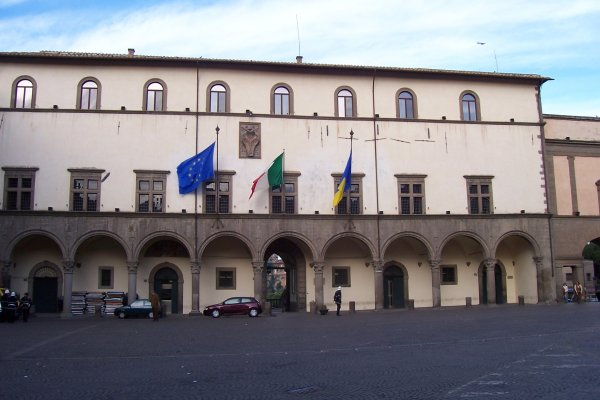
Palazzo dei Priori is Viterbo's City Hall.

The Mayor of Viterbo is an elected politician who, along with the Viterbo's City Council, is accountable for the strategic government of Viterbo in Lazio, Italy.

The current mayor is Chiara Frontini, a centre-right independent, who took office on 27 June 2022.

== Overview ==
According to the Italian Constitution, the Mayor of Viterbo is member of the City Council.

The Mayor is elected by the population of Viterbo, who also elects the members of the City Council, controlling the Mayor's policy guidelines and is able to enforce his resignation by a motion of no confidence. The Mayor is entitled to appoint and release the members of his government.

Since 1993 the Mayor is elected directly by Viterbo's electorate: in all mayoral elections in Italy in cities with a population higher than 15,000 the voters express a direct choice for the mayor or an indirect choice voting for the party of the candidate's coalition. If no candidate receives at least 50% of votes, the top two candidates go to a second round after two weeks. The election of the City Council is based on a direct choice for the candidate with a preference vote: the candidate with the majority of the preferences is elected. The number of the seats for each party is determined proportionally.

== Italian Republic (since 1946) ==
=== City Council election (1946-1995) ===
From 1946 to 1995, the Mayor of Viterbo was elected by the City Council.

	Mayor	Term start	Term end	Party
1	Felice Mignone	1946	1956	DC
2	Domenico Smargiassi	1956	1965	DC
3	Giuseppe Benigni	1965	1966	DC
4	Salvatore Arena	1966	1970	DC
5	Santino Clementi	1970	1970	DC
6	Rodolfo Gigli	1970	1975	DC
7	Rosato Rosati	1975	1983	DC
8	Silvio Ascenzi	1983	1986	DC
9	Francesco Pio Marcoccia	1986	1989	DC
10	Giuseppe Fioroni	1989	1995	DC

=== Direct election (since 1995) ===
Since 1995, under provisions of new local administration law, the Mayor of Viterbo is chosen by direct election, originally every four, then every five years.

	Mayor	Term start	Term end	Party	Coalition	Election
11	Marcello Meroi	8 May 1995	14 June 1999	AN	FI • AN	1995
12	Giancarlo Gabbianelli	14 June 1999	14 June 2004	AN	FI • AN • CCD	1999
12	Giancarlo Gabbianelli	14 June 2004	26 February 2008 (Note: Resigned.)	AN	FI • AN • UDC	2004
Special Prefectural Commissioner tenure (26 February 2008 – 30 April 2008)
13	Giulio Marini	30 April 2008	12 June 2013	PdL	PdL	2008
14	Leonardo Michelini	12 June 2013	27 June 2018	Ind	PD • SEL	2013
15	Giovanni Arena	27 June 2018	27 December 2021 (Note: Outsted from office after the majority of the members of the City Council resigned.)	FI	FI • Lega • FdI	2018
Special Prefectural Commissioner tenure (27 December 2021 – 27 June 2022)
16	Chiara Frontini	27 June 2022	Incumbent	Ind	Ind	2022
