= Clock Tower of Bassano in Teverina =

Italian Renaissance clock tower

Coordinates: 42.4665°N 12.3155°E

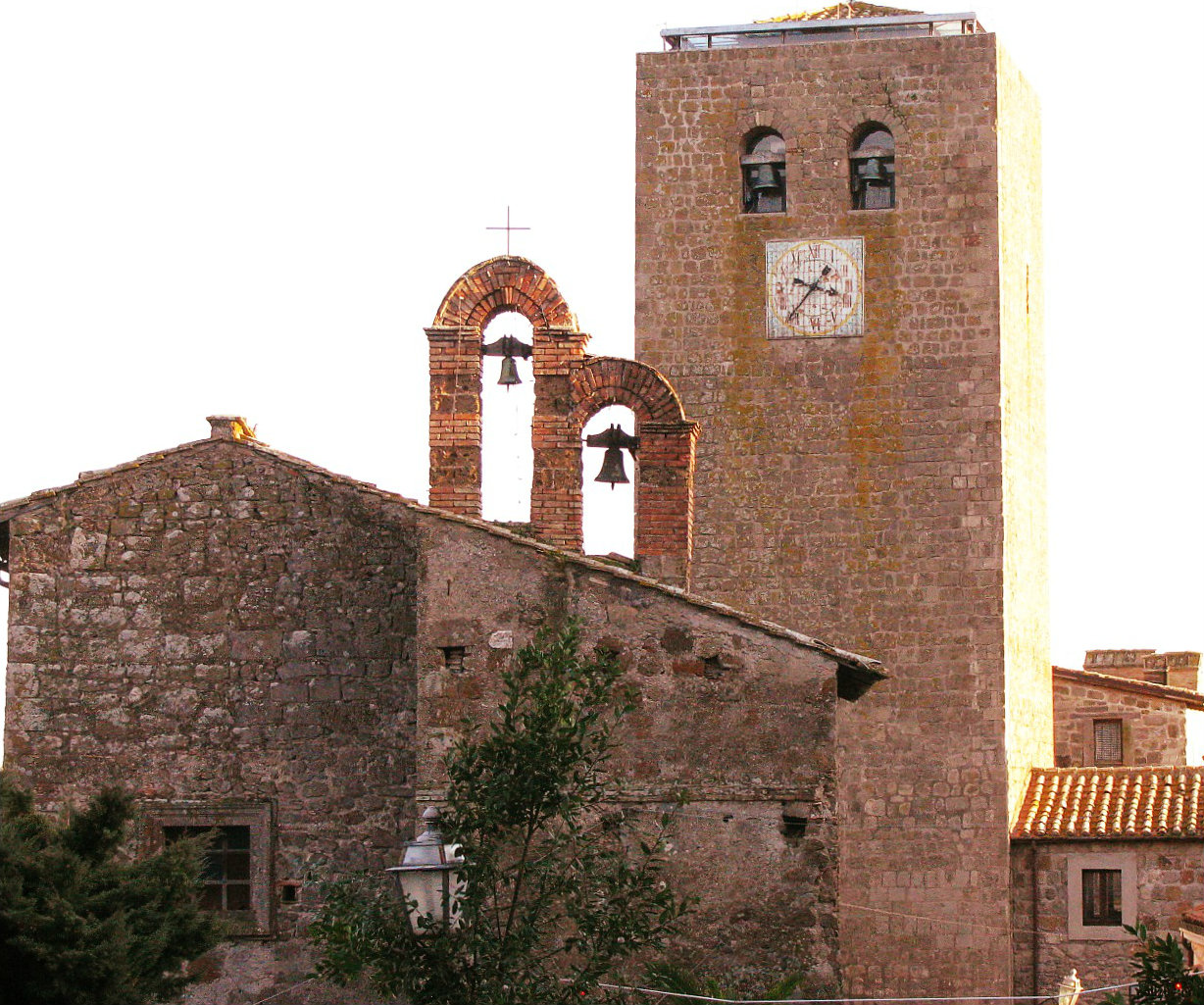
Clock Tower and church of Santa Maria dei Lumi

The Clock Tower of Bassano in Teverina is a Renaissance building in Viterbo, Italy, built to fortify the nearby church of Santa Maria dei Lumi's old bell tower by absorbing it in a tower.

== History ==
The accounts of some pastoral visits realized by the Diocese of Orte (the visitationes) show that the church of Santa Maria dei Lumi's bell tower was built between the 11th and 13th centuries at about 12 meters from the church's façade, in order to use it as a military tower too. However, this structure remained unused soon because another small bell tower was built on the roof of the church (to make the bells ropes handier).

The new tower was built all around the old bell tower between 1559 and 1571 by the Madruzzo family (feudatory of Bassano at that time), who wished to equip the hamlet of a more effective defense system as well as to use it as a symbol of family prestige.

The "two towers" characteristic remained totally unknown until the second half of the twentieth century, since the population was not aware of the existence of the bell tower inside the tower: the discovery was made during the work carried out to consolidate the tower's exterior. After informing the Superintendence, it was elaborated a project aimed at the coexistence of the two structures without demolishing the tower, allowing the simultaneous viewing of the internal bell tower, to which it was placed some filling material. The restoration began in 1976 and ended in 1984.

A few years ago, while a worker was walking on the pavement a few meters from the tower, he almost sank into a hole. After exploring it, it turned out to be a cistern of which, like the tower, people have been ignoring the existence. The cistern is about 10 meters deep and has a diameter of 2 meters, but it has not been fully explored. At the top, it is covered with bricks. By excavating the soil, they found shards, pieces of plates, coins and other not properly identified objects.

== The tower and the bell tower ==
The tower was built with blocks of peperino, its squared base measures 7x7 meters and it is 25 meters high. It is provided with a clock having a face made of eighteenth-century majolica. The bell tower in the inside has got a squared base and is 27 meters high; it is separated from the tower by a 70 cm wide gap and it is made of blocks of peperino up to at 11 meters, blocks in limestone up to 22 meters and then again blocks of peperino in the last few meters.

The four floors that make up the bell tower are characterized by a series of double lancet and triple lancet windows held up by small columns animated by anthropomorphic figures called telamons, columns decorated with floral patterns or twisted columns. Only at the top floor the windows have no decorations, columns are thin and their capitals are slender but smooth. The side facing the church (N-W) is the most decorated, while the S-W side is undecorated.
