= Giovanni Arena (politician) =

Italian politician

Mayor of Viterbo
- In office 27 June 2018 – 27 December 2021
- Preceded by: Leonardo Michelini
- Succeeded by: Chiara Frontini

Personal details
- Born: 18 January 1950 (age 76) Viterbo, Lazio, Italy
- Party: Forza Italia (1994-2009); The People of Freedom (2009-2013); Forza Italia (since 2013)
- Education: University of Perugia
- Profession: employee

Giovanni Maria Arena (born 18 January 1950 in Viterbo) is an Italian politician.

He is a member of the centre-right party Forza Italia. He was elected Mayor of Viterbo on 27 June 2018.

== See also ==
- 2018 Italian local elections
- List of mayors of Viterbo

Political offices
Preceded by Leonardo Michelini	Mayor of Viterbo; 2018-2021	Succeeded by Chiara Frontini
