= Leto Morvidi =

Italian lawyer and politician (1894–1984)

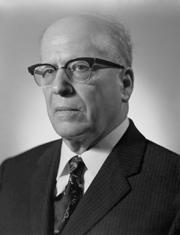

Member of the Chamber of Deputies
- In office 1968–1972

Senator of the Republic
- In office 1963–1968

President of the Province of Viterbo
- In office 1951–1956
- Preceded by: Ferdinando Micara
- Succeeded by: Ferdinando Micara

Mayor of Manciano
- In office 25 February 1945 – 17 March 1946

Personal details
- Born: 5 October 1894 Manciano, Province of Grosseto, Kingdom of Italy
- Died: 23 June 1984 (aged 89) Viterbo, Lazio, Italy
- Party: Italian Communist Party
- Education: University of Sassari
- Occupation: Lawyer

Leto Morvidi (5 October 1894 – 23 June 1984) was an Italian lawyer, politician and writer. A member of the Italian Communist Party, he served as a member of the Chamber of Deputies and the Senate of the Republic, representing the constituencies of Viterbo and Rome.

== Early life and education ==
Morvidi was born in Manciano, province of Grosseto, to Antonio Morvidi and Bianca Lucherini. During his childhood he moved with his family to Sardinia, where his father worked as a school inspector. He completed his classical studies in Sassari in 1912 and became active in the local socialist movement while studying law.

After the outbreak of World War I, Morvidi was called up for military service in June 1915. He attended the Military Academy of Modena and served as a reserve officer in the Italian Army. Graduating in law from the University of Sassari in 1917, he was sent to the front and was wounded at Malga Zugna in Trentino in July 1918. For his conduct in combat he received a commendation and the War Merit Cross.

== Career ==
After leaving military service in 1919, Morvidi worked as a teacher of law and trained as a lawyer. During the 1920s he was secretary of the Socialist Party section in Arezzo and was subjected to attacks by Fascist squads. He later established contacts with the clandestine communist movement and was forced into internal exile in Friuli.

While living in Udine, Morvidi taught, practised law and published legal studies, including Appunti sull'efficacia della legge nel tempo (1932) and Il primo libro del Codice civile (1939). He also contributed to local newspapers and cultural journals.

Following the fall of Fascism, Morvidi joined the Italian Communist Party. After the liberation of Manciano, he was appointed prefectural commissioner by the Allied Military Government. A few months later, local residents petitioned for the direct election of the mayor through a popular vote. The request was approved by the prefect of Grosseto, and on 25 February 1945 Morvidi was elected mayor of Manciano by a large majority, serving until 17 March 1946. During his tenure he promoted educational reforms, including the establishment of an agricultural vocational school.

Morvidi later settled in Viterbo, where he became a prominent lawyer. He participated in several important post-war trials, including proceedings related to the Portella della Ginestra massacre, alongside figures such as Umberto Terracini.

From 1946 to 1966 he served on the Viterbo municipal council and was president of the Province of Viterbo from 1951 to 1956. He served as Senator from 1963 to 1968, when he was elected to the Chamber of Deputies as representative for Rome. He retired from active politics in 1972.

== Literary and cultural activities ==
Morvidi was also known as a writer and cultural figure. A scholar of Dante Alighieri, he published several essays on the Divine Comedy, including Figure dantesche, first issued in 1942. He directed La Ragione, a monthly publication of the Giordano Bruno Association, and remained active in legal and cultural publishing throughout his life.

He played an important role in rebuilding educational and library institutions after World War II, contributing to the establishment of the Biblioteca Anselmo Anselmi in Viterbo and supporting the foundation of the municipal library in Manciano.

== Death ==
Morvidi died in Viterbo on 23 June 1984, aged 89.

== Sources ==
- Camera dei Deputati (1968). I deputati e senatori del quinto Parlamento repubblicano. Rome: La Navicella.
- Senato della Repubblica (1963). I deputati e senatori del quarto Parlamento repubblicano. Rome: La Navicella.
- Morvidi, Leto (1980). Vita militare. Contestazioni. Tenente di... lunghissimo corso. Viterbo: Union Printing.
- Vismara, S.; Carosi, A. (1995). Ricordo di Leto Morvidi nel centenario della sua nascita, Palazzo Gentili, 14 giugno 1995. Viterbo: Union Printing.
