= Chiara Frontini =

Italian politician

Mayor of Viterbo
- Incumbent
- Assumed office 27 June 2022
- Preceded by: Giovanni Arena

Personal details
- Born: 24 March 1989 (age 37) Viterbo, Lazio, Italy
- Party: Centre-right independent
- Education: University of Siena
- Profession: Politician

Chiara Frontini (born 24 March 1989) is an Italian politician, Mayor of Viterbo since 2022 and the first woman to hold the office.

== Biography ==
She made her debut in politics in Viterbo in 2012, when she was appointed councilor for innovation, relations with European institutions, employment policies, energy policies and relations with the University, in the centre-right junta chaired by the Mayor of Viterbo Giulio Marini.

In 2013 Frontini ran for the office of Mayor of Viterbo representing the "Viterbo Venti Venti" civic list. She got 4.69% of the votes, managing to win a seat on the city council. In the subsequent elections of 2018 she ran again for office and enters the ballot against Giovanni Arena, candidate of Forza Italia, who nevertheless manages to get the better of winning with 51.09% of the votes and a difference of only 530 votes.

=== Mayor of Viterbo ===
On the occasion of the local elections of 2022, Frontini announced her third candidacy for mayor, once again for a coalition of civic lists including "Viterbo Venti Venti". On 12 June 2022, in the first round, she obtained 32.82% of the votes and entered the second round on 26 June against the centre-left candidate Alessandra Troncarelli. Frontini is elected mayor with 64.92% of the votes, becoming the first woman Mayor of Viterbo.

Political offices
Preceded by Giovanni Arena	Mayor of Viterbo; 2022-present	Succeeded by Incumbent
