= Marcello Meroi =

Italian politician (born 1958)

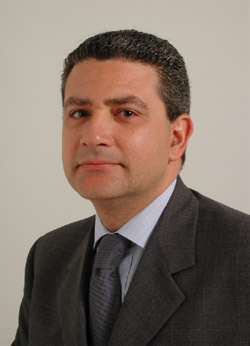

President of the Province of Viterbo
- In office 30 March 2010 – 4 May 2015
- Preceded by: Alessandro Mazzoli
- Succeeded by: Mauro Mazzola

Member of the Chamber of Deputies
- In office 30 May 2001 – 27 April 2006
- Constituency: Lazio 2

Mayor of Viterbo
- In office 8 May 1995 – 14 June 1999
- Preceded by: Giuseppe Fioroni
- Succeeded by: Giancarlo Gabbianelli

Personal details
- Born: 6 March 1958 (age 68) Porto Azzurro, Province of Livorno, Italy
- Party: MSI; AN; PdL
- Occupation: Notary

Marcello Meroi (born 6 March 1958) is an Italian politician who served as a member of the Chamber od Deputies from 2001 to 2006, as mayor of Viterbo from 1995 to 1999 and as president of the Province of Viterbo from 2010 to 2015.
