= List of presidents of the Province of Viterbo =

President of the Province of Viterbo
- Presidente della Provincia di Viterbo
- Incumbent; Alessandro Romoli since 19 December 2021
- Term length: 4 years
- Formation: 1927

The president of the Province of Viterbo is the head of the provincial government in Viterbo, Lazio, Italy. The president oversees the administration of the province, coordinates the activities of the municipalities, and represents the province in regional and national matters.

Since December 2021, the office has been held by Alessandro Romoli of the Forza Italia party.

== History ==
The Province of Viterbo was established in 1927 by the Fascist government. Local autonomy had been abolished and provincial administrations were placed under central control, with appointed officials replacing elected presidents.

After the establishment of the Italian Republic, the office was restored and the president was again elected by the Provincial Council starting from 1951. In 1993, a reform introduced the direct election of the president by popular vote. The Province of Viterbo was eventually reformed in 2014 under national legislation on provinces, with its functions reduced in favour of the Lazio region and local municipalities.

== List ==
=== Presidents of the Provincial Deputation (1944–1951) ===
No.	Portrait	Name	Term of office		Party
No.	Portrait	Name	Start	End	Party
1		Ferdinando Micara	1944	1951	Christian Democracy

=== Presidents of the Province (1951–present) ===
No.	Portrait	Name	Term of office		Party
No.	Portrait	Name	Start	End	Party
1		Leto Morvidi	1951	1956	Italian Communist Party
		Ferdinando Micara	1956	?	Christian Democracy
		Sabatino Mele	28 May 1961	?	Christian Democracy
		?	?	?	?
		Ugo Sposetti	5 May 1978	6 June 1983	Italian Communist Party
		?	?	?	?
		Angelo Antonio Delle Monache	21 October 1988	5 November 1990	Italian Socialist Party
		Claudio Casagrande	26 November 1990	20 December 1991	Italian Socialist Party
		Rosato Rosati	13 February 1992	5 June 1993	Christian Democracy
		Ugo Nardini	21 June 1993	12 May 1997	Democratic Party of the Left
		Giulio Marini	12 May 1997	20 September 1999	Forza Italia
		Carmelo Dimarco	20 September 1999	1 May 2000	Extraordinary commissioner
		Giulio Marini	1 May 2000	19 April 2005	Forza Italia
		Alessandro Mazzoli	19 April 2005	30 March 2010	Democrats of the Left; Democratic Party
		Marcello Meroi	30 March 2010	4 May 2015	The People of Freedom
		Mauro Mazzola	4 May 2015	26 June 2017	Democratic Party
		Maurizio Palozzi (acting)	26 June 2017	19 September 2017	Democratic Party
		Pietro Nocchi	19 September 2017	19 December 2021	Democratic Party
		Alessandro Romoli	19 December 2021	22 December 2025	Forza Italia
		Alessandro Romoli	22 December 2025	Incumbent	Forza Italia

== Sources ==
- Barbini, Bruno (1988). Viterbo e la Tuscia: Dall'istituzione della provincia al decentramento regionale. Cassa di Risparmio.
- "Storia amministrativa dell'ente". Ministero dell'Interno.
