= Fidentius and Terence =

Fidentius and Terence have been venerated as Christian martyrs in the city of Todi since the discovery of some relics there in the 12th century. Their feast day is 27 September. Nothing factual can be known about who lies behind the relics. Their hagiography is entirely fictitious and they were removed from the Roman martyrology in 2004.

According to their acta, they were born at Chalcedon and left Roman Syria in order to seek martyrdom during the Diocletianic Persecution. Several attempts to kill them at Rome failed until an angel told their persecutors to go to Todi. There they were beheaded around the year 305.
