= Soriano nel Cimino =

- Comune
- Comune di Soriano nel Cimino
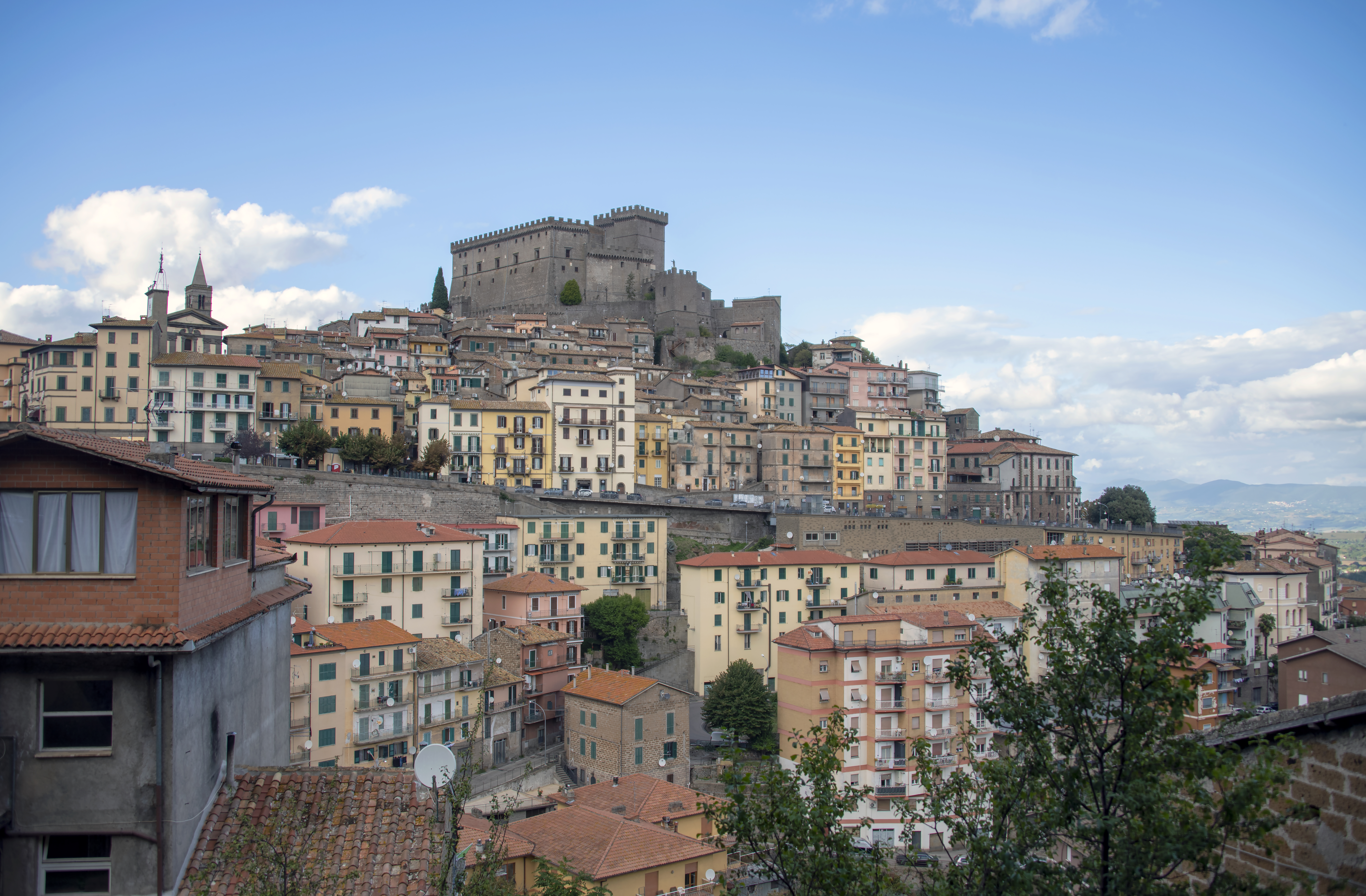

- Coat of arms

- Location within Italy Location within Lazio
- Coordinates: 42°25′10″N 12°14′3″E
- Country: Italy
- Region: Lazio
- Province: Viterbo (VT)
- Frazioni: Sant'Eutizio, Chia

Government
  - Mayor: Fabio Menicacci

Area
  - Total: 78.48 km^{2} (30.30 sq mi)
- Elevation: 480 m (1,570 ft)

Population (31 December 2014)
  - Total: 9,466
  - Density: 120.6/km^{2} (312.4/sq mi)
- Demonym: Sorianesi
- Time zone: UTC+1 (CET)
  - Summer (DST): UTC+2 (CEST)
- Postal code: 01038
- Dialing code: 0761
- Patron saint: Saint Nicholas
- Saint day: 6 December, 15 May
- Website: Official website

Soriano nel Cimino is a town and comune in the province of Viterbo, Lazio, central Italy.

The town is overlooked by Monte Cimino, the highest peak in the Monti Cimini.

== Main sights ==
- The Orsini Castle, built by Orso Orsini in the 13th century. It was the summer residence of Pope Nicholas III, uncle of Orso. It was a high security castle until the 1990s and is now managed by the Tuscia University.
- The Palazzo Chigi-Albani (16th century), designed by Ottaviano Schiratti. The interior houses the Papacqua Fountain.
- The small Romanesque church of San Giorgio (11th century).
- Cathedral (Duomo), of San Nicola di Bari from 1794.
- Church of Sant'Eutizio.
- Fontana Vecchia ("Old Fountain"), built in the 15th century.
- Porta Romana ("Roman Gate"), a copy of the Porta Pia in Rome.
- SUBLIMAZIONE (Urban Sculpture), a permanent installation by Giorgio Capogrossi (Montez) - Piazzale Cavalieri di Vittorio Veneto
