= List of municipalities of the Province of Rieti =

The following is a list of the 73 municipalities (comuni) of the Province of Rieti in the region of Lazio in Italy.

== List ==
Municipality	Population (2026)	Area (km^{2})	Density
Accumoli	493	87.37	5.6
Amatrice	2,146	174.40	12.3
Antrodoco	2,238	63.90	35.0
Ascrea	195	13.98	13.9
Belmonte in Sabina	653	23.65	27.6
Borbona	573	47.96	11.9
Borgo Velino	901	18.29	49.3
Borgorose	4,210	145.82	28.9
Cantalice	2,386	37.62	63.4
Cantalupo in Sabina	1,657	10.62	156.0
Casaprota	678	14.55	46.6
Casperia	1,215	25.31	48.0
Castel di Tora	271	15.49	17.5
Castel Sant'Angelo	1,156	31.27	37.0
Castelnuovo di Farfa	987	8.84	111.7
Cittaducale	6,400	71.25	89.8
Cittareale	374	59.67	6.3
Collalto Sabino	369	22.37	16.5
Colle di Tora	348	14.37	24.2
Collegiove	133	10.61	12.5
Collevecchio	1,575	26.95	58.4
Colli sul Velino	465	12.76	36.4
Concerviano	282	21.39	13.2
Configni	556	22.93	24.2
Contigliano	3,657	53.55	68.3
Cottanello	517	36.70	14.1
Fara in Sabina	13,968	54.96	254.1
Fiamignano	1,151	100.62	11.4
Forano	3,230	17.69	182.6
Frasso Sabino	733	4.39	167.0
Greccio	1,448	17.86	81.1
Labro	342	11.75	29.1
Leonessa	2,019	204.04	9.9
Longone Sabino	510	34.33	14.9
Magliano Sabina	3,457	43.23	80.0
Marcetelli	53	11.08	4.8
Micigliano	119	36.85	3.2
Mompeo	504	10.89	46.3
Montasola	398	12.75	31.2
Monte San Giovanni in Sabina	664	30.76	21.6
Montebuono	844	19.73	42.8
Monteleone Sabino	1,128	19.04	59.2
Montenero Sabino	268	22.59	11.9
Montopoli di Sabina	4,109	37.94	108.3
Morro Reatino	334	15.74	21.2
Nespolo	207	8.65	23.9
Orvinio	379	24.69	15.4
Paganico Sabino	155	9.31	16.6
Pescorocchiano	1,797	94.78	19.0
Petrella Salto	1,014	102.93	9.9
Poggio Bustone	1,957	22.38	87.4
Poggio Catino	1,303	14.98	87.0
Poggio Mirteto	6,081	26.40	230.3
Poggio Moiano	2,795	26.95	103.7
Poggio Nativo	2,582	16.50	156.5
Poggio San Lorenzo	563	8.67	64.9
Posta	518	66.01	7.8
Pozzaglia Sabina	303	24.98	12.1
Rieti	44,866	206.46	217.3
Rivodutri	1,121	26.79	41.8
Rocca Sinibalda	801	49.56	16.2
Roccantica	542	16.72	32.4
Salisano	462	17.60	26.3
Scandriglia	3,347	63.35	52.8
Selci	1,117	7.73	144.5
Stimigliano	2,205	11.38	193.8
Tarano	1,369	19.98	68.5
Toffia	1,050	11.33	92.7
Torri in Sabina	1,209	26.31	46.0
Torricella in Sabina	1,283	25.79	49.7
Turania	233	8.51	27.4
Vacone	214	9.19	23.3
Varco Sabino	148	24.75	6.0

== See also ==
- List of municipalities of Lazio
- List of municipalities of Italy
