= Sabina (oil) =

Protected origin olive oil from Sabina, Italy

Sabina is a Protected Designation of Origin (PDO) that applies to the extra virgin olive oil produced in the Sabina region. This area approximately covers the territory originally occupied by the ancient Sabines tribe in the Province of Rome and the Province of Rieti. It is considered to be the first Italian PDO to gain the status, later being followed by Aprutino Pescarese, Brisighella, Collina di Brindisi and Canino.

== Production area: Sabina ==
The production area of the PDO extra virgin olive oil is mainly in two provinces, Rieti and Rome, and follows the borders of the ancient Sabine territory. Techniques used to produce the oil are almost the same as in pre-Roman times with necessary technological innovations. For the production of the extra virgin olive oil Sabina, the soil and the mild climate are of fundamental importance.

=== Municipalities in the Province of Rieti ===
The following municipalities within the province of Rieti are areas of production of Sabina: Cantalupo in Sabina, Casaprota, Casperia, Castelnuovo di Farfa, Collevecchio, Configni, Cottanello, Fara Sabina, Forano, Frasso Sabino, Magliano Sabina, Mompeo, Montasola, Montebuono, Monteleone Sabino, Montenero Sabino, Montopoli in Sabina, Poggio Catino, Poggio Mirteto, Poggio Moiano, Poggio Nativo, Poggio San Lorenzo, Roccantica, Salisano, Scandriglia, Selci, Stimigliano, Tarano, Toffia, Torricella, Torri in Sabina, Vacone.

=== Municipalities in the Province of Rome ===
In the province of Rome: Guidonia Montecelio, Fonte Nuova, Marcellina, Mentana, Monteflavio, Montelibretti, Monterotondo, Montorio Romano, Moricone, Nerola, Palombara Sabina, Sant'Angelo Romano, San Polo dei Cavalieri (località Caprareccia e territorio non oltre i 475 metri di altitudine), Roma (parzialmente il territorio del Nord-Est).

== Cultivar and organoleptic traits ==
=== Cultivar ===
The characterizing cultivar are:

- Carboncella
- Leccino
- Raja
- Pendolino
- Frantoio
- Moraiolo
- Olivastrone
- Salviana
- Olivago and Rosciola

=== Organoleptic traits ===
Organoleptic traits:

- color: yellow - green with golden nuances.
- aroma: fruity;
- taste: fruity, velvet, uniform, aromatic, sweet, bitter and piquant for the just pressed oils;
- panel test: median in fruity > 0 e median of defect = 0;
- maximum acidity in total expressed in oleic acid, in weight, not exceeding grams 0,6 per 100 grams of oil;
- number of peroxides 14 Meq0 2 /kg.;
- minimum oleic acid 68%.

== See also ==
- Appellation
- Country of origin
- European Union Common Agricultural Policy
- Genericized trademark
- Geographical indication
- Italian cuisine
- Italian wines
- List of geographical designations for spirit drinks in the European Union
- List of Italian cheeses
- List of Italian DOC wines
- List of Italian DOCG wines
- List of Italian products with protected designation of origin
- Olive oil regulation and adulteration
- Olive oil
- Protected Geographical Status
- Quality Wines Produced in Specified Regions (QWPSR)
