= Madonna Della Valle, Rivodutri =

Church building in Rivodutri, Italy

Coordinates: 42°31′03.7″N 12°51′21.2″E

The small church of the Madonna della Valle is a Roman Catholic church located on a hillside above the town of Rivodutri, province of Rieti, region of Lazio, Italy.

== History and description ==
Originally, the fresco of the virgin was located in a small chapel lower down in the valley, hence the name. Tradition holds that circa 1750, a boulder from the mountain wrecked that small chapel. It was decided to build a new church, in a more protected spot higher on the mountain, to shelter the venerated image. This church corresponded to the apse of the present church. The remainder was part of an expansion of the structure with a nave with four side altars in 1827. Further restorations and the elaborate iron gate was added in 1927. The interior has few decorations except for a few paintings, including a depiction of San Giuseppe da Leonessa.
