= Torricella =

Torricella may refer to:

- Torricella, Apulia, town and comune in the province of Taranto, in the Apulia region of southeast Italy.
- Torricella-Taverne, municipality in the district of Lugano in the canton of Ticino in Switzerland
- Torricella Sicura, town and comune in the province of Teramo, in the Abruzzo region of central Italy.
- Torricella Verzate, comune in the Province of Pavia in the Italian region Lombardy, Italy.
- Torricella Peligna, comune and town in the Province of Chieti in the Abruzzo region of Italy.
- Torricella del Pizzo, comune (municipality) in the Province of Cremona in the Italian region Lombardy, Italy.
- Torricella in Sabina, comune (municipality) in the Province of Rieti in the Italian region Latium, Italy.
