= Leda Battisti =

Italian singer-songwriter

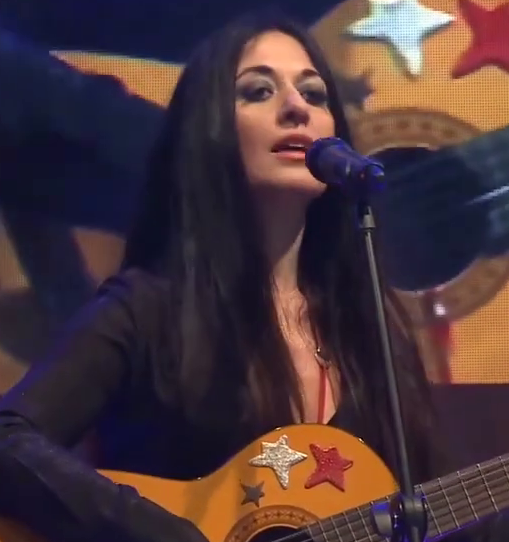
- Battisti in 2018
- Born: 24 February 1971 (age 55); Poggio Bustone, Rieti, Italy
- Occupation: singer-songwriter

Leda Battisti (born 24 February 1971) is an Italian singer-songwriter.

== Background ==
Born in Poggio Bustone, Rieti, Battisti graduated in classical guitar at the conservatory of Rieti, then in 1992 she won the Pippo Baudo's television show Partita doppia.

After enrolling the CET, a music school founded and directed by Mogol, and after several significant collaborations including Ottmar Liebert, in 1998 Battisti obtained her first success with the song "Come l'acqua al deserto". The same year Battisti dubbed Lucky in the original version of the animation film Lucky and Zorba, also recording the song "Non sono un gatto", part of the soundtrack of the film.

In 1999 Battisti entered the Sanremo Music Festival with the song "Un fiume in piena", ranking third in the "Newcomers" section and winning the critic's prize. In 2006 she was cast in the reality show Music Farm. In 2007 Battisti returned to Sanremo Festival, this time entering the "Big Artists" section, with the song "Senza me ti pentirai". In 2012 she collaborated to the soundtrack, composed by Lucio Dalla, of the animated film Pinocchio.

== Discography ==
Album

- 1998 - Leda Battisti
- 2000 - Passionaria
- 2006 - Tu, l'amore e il sesso
