= Petrella Salto =

- Comune
- Comune di Petrella Salto
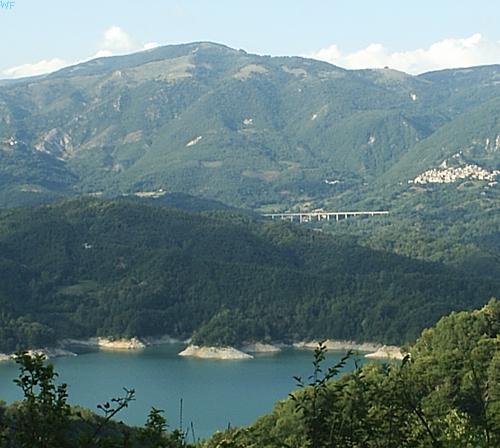
- The Lake Salto and Petrella.

- Location within Italy Location within Lazio
- Coordinates: 42°18′N 13°4′E
- Country: Italy
- Region: Lazio
- Province: Rieti (RI)
- Frazioni: Borgo San Pietro, Capradosso, Castel Mareri, Cerreta, Colle della Sponga, Colle Rosso, Diga Salto, Fiumata, Offeio, Oiano, Pagliara, Piagge, San Martino, Staffoli, Teglieto

Government
  - Mayor: Gaetano Micaloni

Area
  - Total: 102.0 km^{2} (39.4 sq mi)
- Elevation: 786 m (2,579 ft)

Population (2008)
  - Total: 1,308
  - Density: 12.82/km^{2} (33.21/sq mi)
- Demonym: Petrellani
- Time zone: UTC+1 (CET)
  - Summer (DST): UTC+2 (CEST)
- Postal code: 02025
- Dialing code: 0746
- Website: Official website

Petrella Salto (Sabino: La Petrella) is a comune (municipality) in the Province of Rieti, in the Italian region of Latium. It is located about 60 kilometres (37 mi) northeast of Rome, and about 20 kilometres (12 mi) southeast of Rieti.
