= Rivodutri =

- Comune
- Comune di Rivodutri
- Coat of arms

- Location within Italy Location within Lazio
- Coordinates: 42°31′N 12°51′E
- Country: Italy
- Region: Lazio
- Province: Rieti (RI)

Government
  - Mayor: Barbara Pelagotti

Area
  - Total: 26.85 km^{2} (10.37 sq mi)
- Elevation: 560 m (1,840 ft)

Population (30 November 2016)
  - Total: 1,228
  - Density: 45.74/km^{2} (118.5/sq mi)
- Demonym: Rivodutrani
- Time zone: UTC+1 (CET)
  - Summer (DST): UTC+2 (CEST)
- Postal code: 02010
- Dialing code: 0746
- Patron saint: St. Michael Archangel
- Saint day: 29 September
- Website: Official website

Rivodutri (Sabino: Riutri) is a comune (municipality) in the Province of Rieti in the Italian region of Lazio, located about 70 kilometres (43 mi) northeast of Rome and about 13 kilometres (8 mi) north of Rieti.

Rivodutri borders the following municipalities: Colli sul Velino, Leonessa, Morro Reatino, Poggio Bustone, Polino, Rieti.

== Monuments and places of interest ==
Rivodutri retains for the most part its ancient appearance, with buildings from the fifteenth and sixteenth century.

Church of Madonna della Valle
The church of the Madonna della Valle is a Roman Catholic church located on a hillside above the town.
Church of San Michele Arcangelo
In the parish church of San Michele Arcangelo, patron saint of the town, there is a valuable eighteenth-century canvas depicting "Jesus crucified, with St. John, Mary Of Sorrows and Magdalene".

Church of Our Lady of the Valley
Another much-loved church, a destination for pilgrimages, is that of Our Lady of the Valley, erected in the place where, in 1652, the Virgin appeared to such Alessio Damiani. An attempt was then made to transfer to the church of the village the image of our Lady which, miraculously, was found in the original church (the episode occurred several times). The idea was born then to transport elsewhere, together with the image, the entire rock on which Our Lady had appeared and to build on it the current eighteenth-century sanctuary.

Alchemical door
The alchemical gate,located in Via Umberto I, is a monumental 16th-century arch decorated with esoteric bas-reliefs,whose symbolism is, however, different from that of the better known Alchemical Gate of Rome. The arch today gives access to a small park, but in the past it was the main access of a palace that no longer exists today (Palazzo Camiciotti). A recent study, carried out by Franco Lelli, places the artifact in the second half of the 1700s and wants it destined to adorn the entrance to the house of a couple of young spouses. Symbolism refers to Greek, Latin, Christian, pagan, and alchemical themes, but only, the latter, to the extent dictated by the historical period of its realization. The "alchemical" call lies all in the power of love, capable of magically transforming, esoterically, the subjects who love each other. The two faces above the Arch can be traced back to Dionysus and Arianna, an expression of Christ's bond and the Church, confirmed by the underlying indication "UNA (DEAR?)" a single flesh, as recalls the letter of St. Paul the Apostle to the Ephesians, directed at the duties of wife and husband.

=== Natural areas ===
Santa Susanna Springs
Inside the municipal territory (near the hamlet Piedicolle) there is the spring of Santa Susanna, with an extraordinary flow rate of 5000 liters per second that makes it one of the largest in Europe. In the spring, at Christmas time, an underwater nativity scene is set up. At the source there is a botanical garden equipped with benches and playground and a pond populated by swans. From the spring originate the Santa Susanna river (which, after feeding an ancient mill, flows into Lake Ripasottile)and the Canal of Santa Susanna (which flows directly into the Velino River). The waters of these two waterways are rich in freshwater fish such as trout, which is one of the main local gastronomic specialties.

Lungo and Ripasottile Lakes Partial Nature Reserve
Part of the municipal territory is included in a nature reserve of which the aforementioned springs of Santa Susanna are part, but also the Lungo Lake and Ripasottile Lake. Inside the reserve there is a wetland surrounded by reedbeds, which provides shelter for numerous species of migratory birds, and has maintained an environment similar to that before the reclamation of the Piana Reatina.

Path of Francis and Beech of St. Francis
Within the municipality, the main place linked to the passage of St. Francis of Assisi, is a majestic beech tree of extraordinary shape and size, called "beech of St. Francis". The tree, now centuries old, is located in a forest located on the slopes of Mount Fausola (near the hamlet cepparo) and is counted among the natural monuments of the Lazio region. Its particular physiognomy is caused by a very rare genetic mutation,to date found only in two other specimens throughout the planet.
Tradition has it that the tree folded its branches and took this form to prepare a comfortable bed for St. Francis, who found shelter there during a thunderstorm. Next to the tree, there is a rock with the imprint that, according to legend, would have been left the moment, badly apostrophed by a blacksmith who asked him to pay for the shoeing of his donkey, the saint came down from the croup and ordered the beast to return the irons. The beech and other Franciscan places of the Piana Reatina are connected by the Way of Francis, a path surrounded by nature and a destination for tourists and pilgrims.

== Twin towns ==
- Seregélyes, Hungary
- Candelario, Spain
