= Monte San Giovanni =

Monte San Giovanni may refer to:

- Monte San Giovanni Campano, Italian municipality of the province of Frosinone
- Monte San Giovanni in Sabina, Italian municipality of the province of Rieti
