= Polino =

- Comune
- Comune di Polino
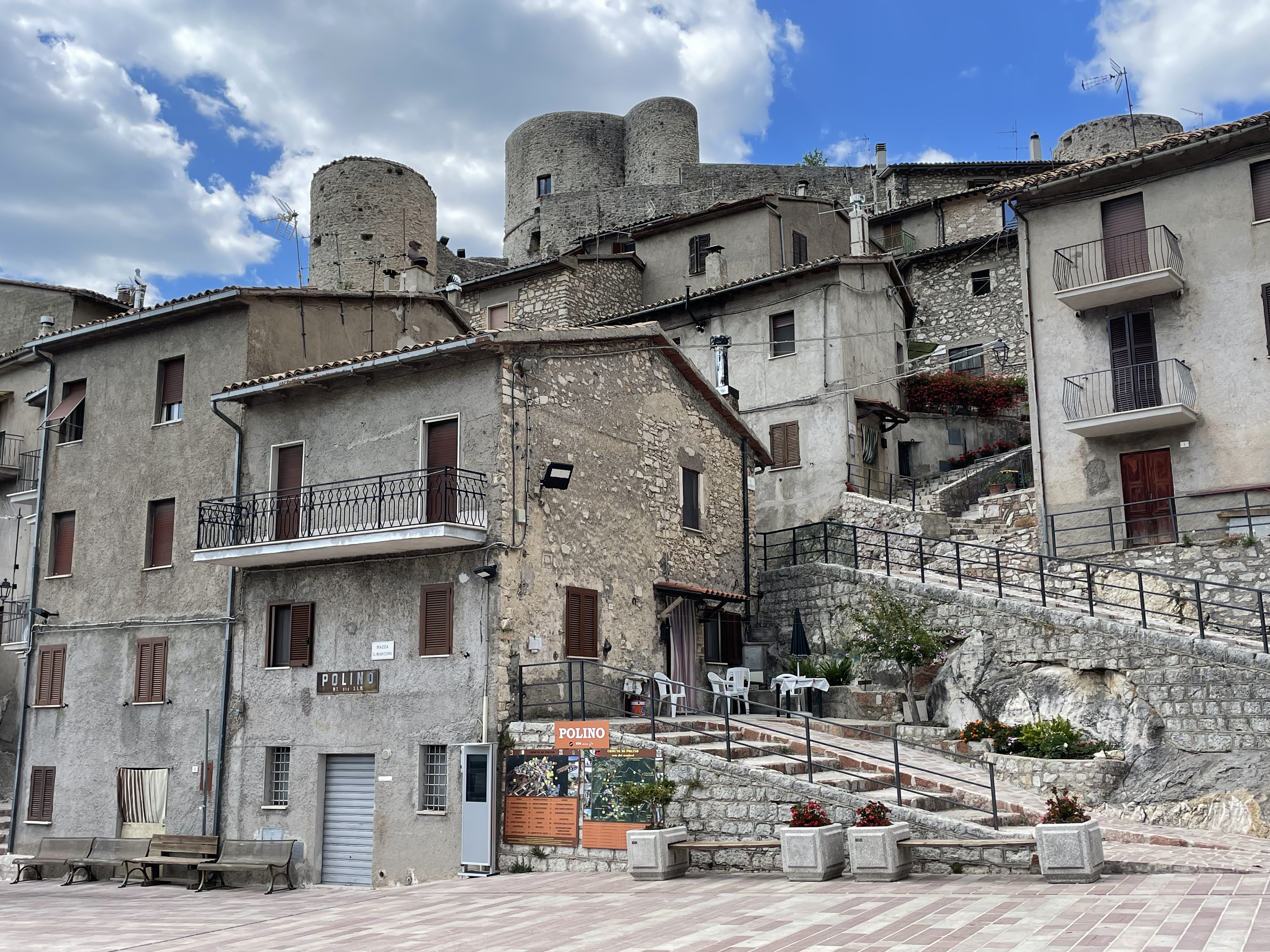
- View of Polino

- Location within Italy Location within Umbria
- Coordinates: 42.584883°N 12.843929°E
- Country: Italy
- Region: Umbria
- Province: Province of Terni (TR)

Area
  - Total: 19.5 km^{2} (7.5 sq mi)
- Elevation: 836 m (2,743 ft)

Population (1 January 2025)
  - Total: 220
  - Density: 11/km^{2} (29/sq mi)
- Demonym: Polinesi
- Time zone: UTC+1 (CET)
  - Summer (DST): UTC+2 (CEST)
- Postal code: 05030
- Dialing code: 0744

Polino is a comune (municipality) in the Province of Terni in the Italian region Umbria, located about 70 km southeast of Perugia and about 15 km east of Terni. As of 2025, it had a population of 220.

== History ==
The settlement was originally known as Pulino. It was founded in the 12th century by the Polini family and subsequently passed under the control of the Arroni family.

In 1248, Pope Innocent IV granted the town to Spoleto. During the 14th century, it experienced shifting allegiances and occupations: in 1333 it was taken by the forces of King Robert of Anjou of Naples, and in 1340 it renewed its submission to Spoleto. Throughout the Middle Ages, it functioned as a fortified border center between the Kingdom of Naples and the Papal States. A local mint operated there, striking coinage with gold extracted from a nearby mine.

In 1416 the fortress was acquired by Niccolò VIII, Bartolomeo IV, and Corrado XV Trinci. The following year the lordship passed to Tommaso and Giampaolo di Chiodo, and in 1421 the Rocca was assigned to Corrado XV Trinci. Later in the 15th century, control returned to the Polini family.

The early 16th century was marked by further unrest. In 1527, during a popular uprising, the nobleman Andrea de' Domo was killed after being accused of sexually assaulting a young girl, and the inhabitants rose in revolt and again submitted to Spoleto. In 1528 the town was occupied by Sciarra II Colonna and allied Landsknechts.

Later in the century it came under the rule of the Castelli family of Terni. Through the marriage of Maria Clelia Castelli and Alessandro Baldassini, authority passed into the Baldassini line; Francesco Maria Baldassini Castelli eventually died without direct heirs, bringing that branch to an end.

In 1762 an iron and silver mine was opened in the surrounding mountains. During the 1760s, the local mint produced early scudi of Pope Clement XIII. In the late 18th century, the Albergotti family of Arezzo settled in the town.

During the period of the French Republic, the town was incorporated into the Canton of Terni. After the Restoration, it became a baronial municipality under Filippo Stefanoni Simonetti and Antonio Albergotti.

In 1860 the town was annexed to the Kingdom of Italy. A plebiscite held on 4 November 1860 confirmed annexation, and the first municipal elections took place on 11 November of the same year. Francesco Fiorelli was appointed as mayor.

== Geography ==
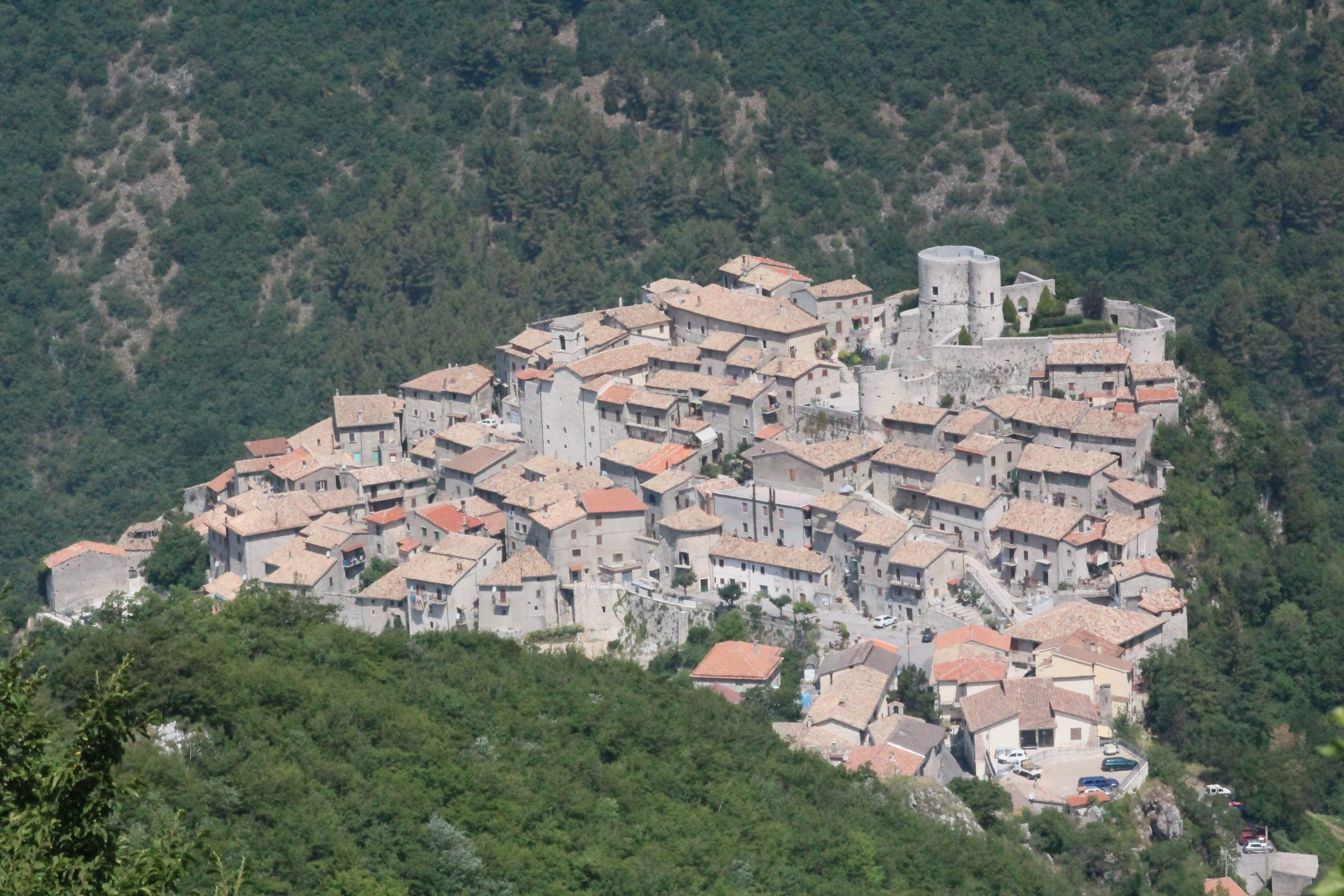
Polino and the densely forested slopes of Monte Petano

Polino is situated on the western slopes of the Apennines, near the pass leading to Leonessa. It lies approximately 12 miles east of Terni and 7 miles northeast of Lake Piediluco. The municipal territory is almost entirely mountainous.

The town is located at the foot of Monte Petano.

Polino borders the following municipalities: Arrone, Ferentillo, Leonessa, Morro Reatino, Rivodutri.

== Economy ==
In the late 19th century, the surrounding area produced some wheat and other cereals, though much of the land was used as pasture. The territory was particularly rich in oak trees and other woodland, providing abundant firewood.

Some authors also mentioned the presence of marble quarries, an iron mine, and a silver mine. The historian Serafino Calindri recorded that silver from this mine was used as a test sample to mint a medal of Pope Clement XIII in 1762. However, by the late 19th century, there was no evidence of ongoing mining activity.

== Religion and culture ==
=== San Michele Arcangelo ===
The Church of San Michele Arcangelo stands at the center of Polino. The building dates to the 16th century, although documentation attests its function as a parish church only from 1792. Since 2013 the church has undergone a series of restoration and consolidation works. The parish is currently part of Archdiocese of Spoleto-Norcia.

=== Fortress and museum ===
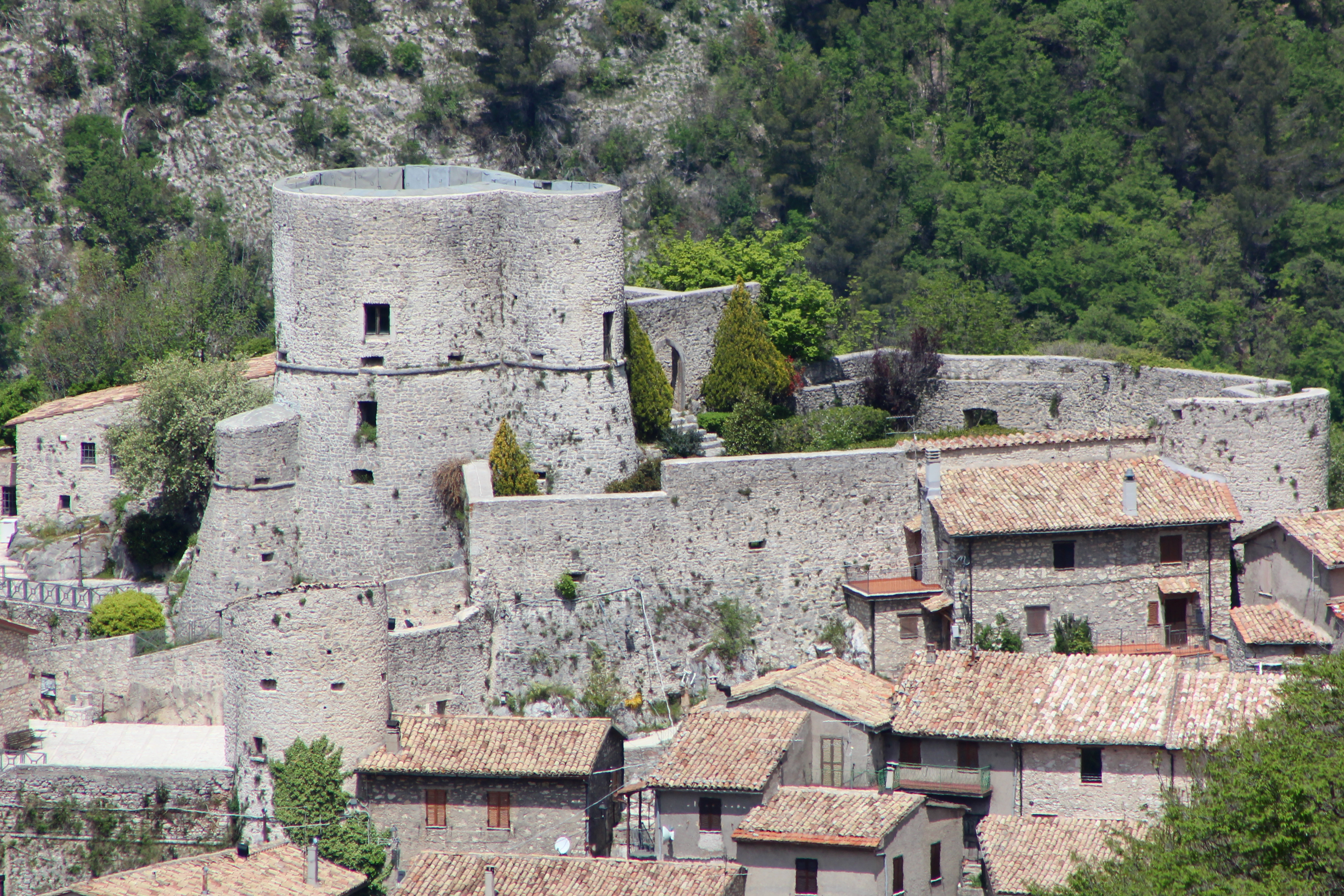
The rocca of Polino

The fortress of Polino was founded in the 12th century by the Polini family. Of the original defensive system with a double circuit of walls, only part of the structure remains, characterized by a polygonal plan and two groups of cylindrical towers placed opposite each other. Within the fortress is the Museo–Laboratorio dell'Appennino Umbro, housed partly in Palazzo Castelli. The museum presents the geology and palaeontology of the Umbrian Apennines through interactive displays and activities.
