= Santa Anna di Borbona =

Church in Borbona, Italy

Coordinates: 42°30′43″N 13°07′38″E

Santa Anna di Borbona is a Roman Catholic church and convent in the town limits of Borbona, province of Rieti, region of Lazio, Italy.

The original church of Santa Anna was likely built in the second half of the 15th century, adjacent to a castle and its attached houses. It was originally a chapel or oratory linked to the Confraternita della Misericordia. This confraternity helped the ill and buried the dead. In the 17th century, the church became attached to a convent of Franciscans. In 1866, the convent was suppressed and the church ceded to the commune of Borbona. For some time, it became a police station.

The church has a single nave with seven side altars. Atop the portal is the symbol of St Bernardino of Siena. Recently a 1625 fresco depicting Saints Antony of Padua and Roch was uncovered and attributed to the Master of the Icona passatora.

The municipality, in cooperation with architecture students, has been considering options for the future of the building, which was damaged in the earthquake of 2016.
