= Poggio Catino =

- Comune
- Comune di Poggio Catino
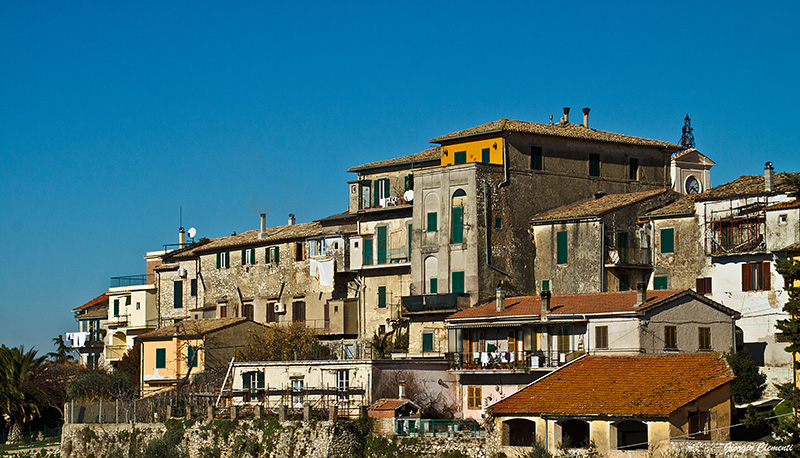
- Panoramic view

- Location within Italy Location within Lazio
- Coordinates: 42°17′42.0″N 12°41′31.7″E
- Country: Italy
- Region: Lazio
- Province: Rieti (RI)
- Frazioni: Catino

Government
  - Mayor: Roberto Sturba (Civic List, since 2009)

Area
  - Total: 15.0 km^{2} (5.8 sq mi)
- Elevation: 387 m (1,270 ft)

Population (2011)
  - Total: 1,335
  - Density: 89.0/km^{2} (231/sq mi)
- Demonym: Poggiocatinari
- Time zone: UTC+1 (CET)
  - Summer (DST): UTC+2 (CEST)
- Postal code: 02040
- Dialing code: 0765
- Patron saint: St. Sylvester and St. Roch
- Saint day: 31 December and 16 August
- Website: Official website

Poggio Catino is a comune (municipality) in the Province of Rieti in the Italian region of Latium, located about 45 kilometres (28 mi) northeast of Rome and about 20 kilometres (12 mi) southwest of Rieti. As of 31 December 2011, it had a population of 1,335 and an area of 15.0 square kilometres (5.8 mi^{2}).

== History ==
The village was created at the end of the 11th century, above the Moricone hill, to find a larger building space than that of the nearby village of Catino, founded in the 7th century, and nowadays a hamlet of it. The toponym itself describes the topography of the built-up area: a hillock (poggio) above a basin (catino). Once under the sway of Farfa Abbey, it later became part of the Province of Perugia, after the Italian unification (1861). Since 1927, with the creation of the province of Rieti, Poggio Catino, as well as the rest of the new province, passed from the region of Umbria to the one of Lazio.

== Geography ==
Poggio Catino is a hilltown part of the historic region of Sabina. The municipality borders with Cantalupo in Sabina, Forano, Poggio Mirteto, Roccantica and Salisano.

Its only hamlet (frazione), is the nearby village of Catino (42°17′25.8″N 12°41′36.0″E), 1 km far and with a population of 112.

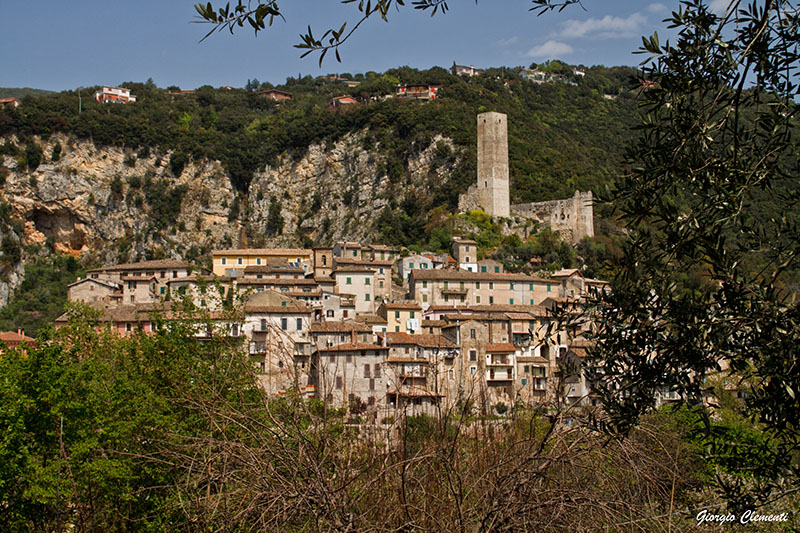
Panoramic view of Catino with the Longobard fortress in background

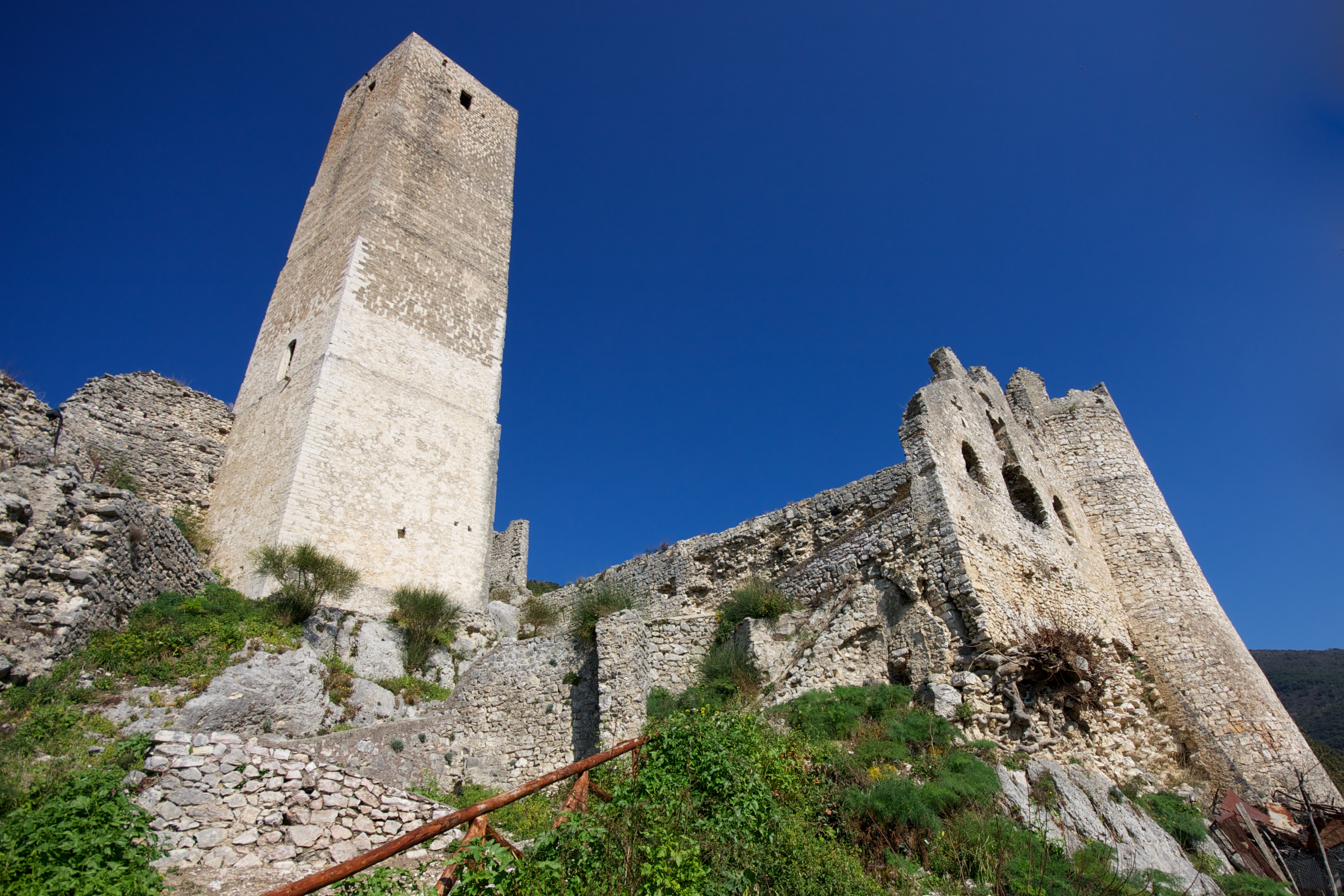
The Longobard fortress of Catino

== Demographics ==
Historical population

Year	Pop.	±%
1861	912	—
1871	917	+0.5%
1881	1,102	+20.2%
1901	1,196	+8.5%
1911	1,276	+6.7%

Year	Pop.	±%
1921	1,319	+3.4%
1931	1,345	+2.0%
1936	1,359	+1.0%
1951	1,409	+3.7%
1961	1,185	−15.9%

Year	Pop.	±%
1971	1,002	−15.4%
1981	1,023	+2.1%
1991	1,103	+7.8%
2001	1,220	+10.6%
2011	1,335	+9.4%

Source: Data from ISTAT

== Personalities ==
- Gregory of Catino (1060–1130), Christian monk and historian
