= Colli sul Velino =

- Comune
- Comune di Colli sul Velino
- Coat of arms

- Location within Italy Location within Lazio
- Coordinates: 42°30′N 12°47′E
- Country: Italy
- Region: Lazio
- Province: Rieti (RI)

Government
  - Mayor: Alberto Micanti

Area
  - Total: 13.1 km^{2} (5.1 sq mi)
- Elevation: 465 m (1,526 ft)

Population (30 June 2017)
  - Total: 513
  - Density: 39.2/km^{2} (101/sq mi)
- Demonym: Collani
- Time zone: UTC+1 (CET)
  - Summer (DST): UTC+2 (CEST)
- Postal code: 02010
- Dialing code: 0746
- Website: Official website

Colli sul Velino is a comune (municipality) in the Province of Rieti in the Italian region of Latium, located about 70 kilometres (43 mi) northeast of Rome and about 13 kilometres (8 mi) northwest of Rieti.

Colli sul Velino borders the following municipalities: Contigliano, Labro, Morro Reatino, Rieti, Rivodutri, Terni.
