= Poggio Bustone =

- Comune
- Comune di Poggio Bustone
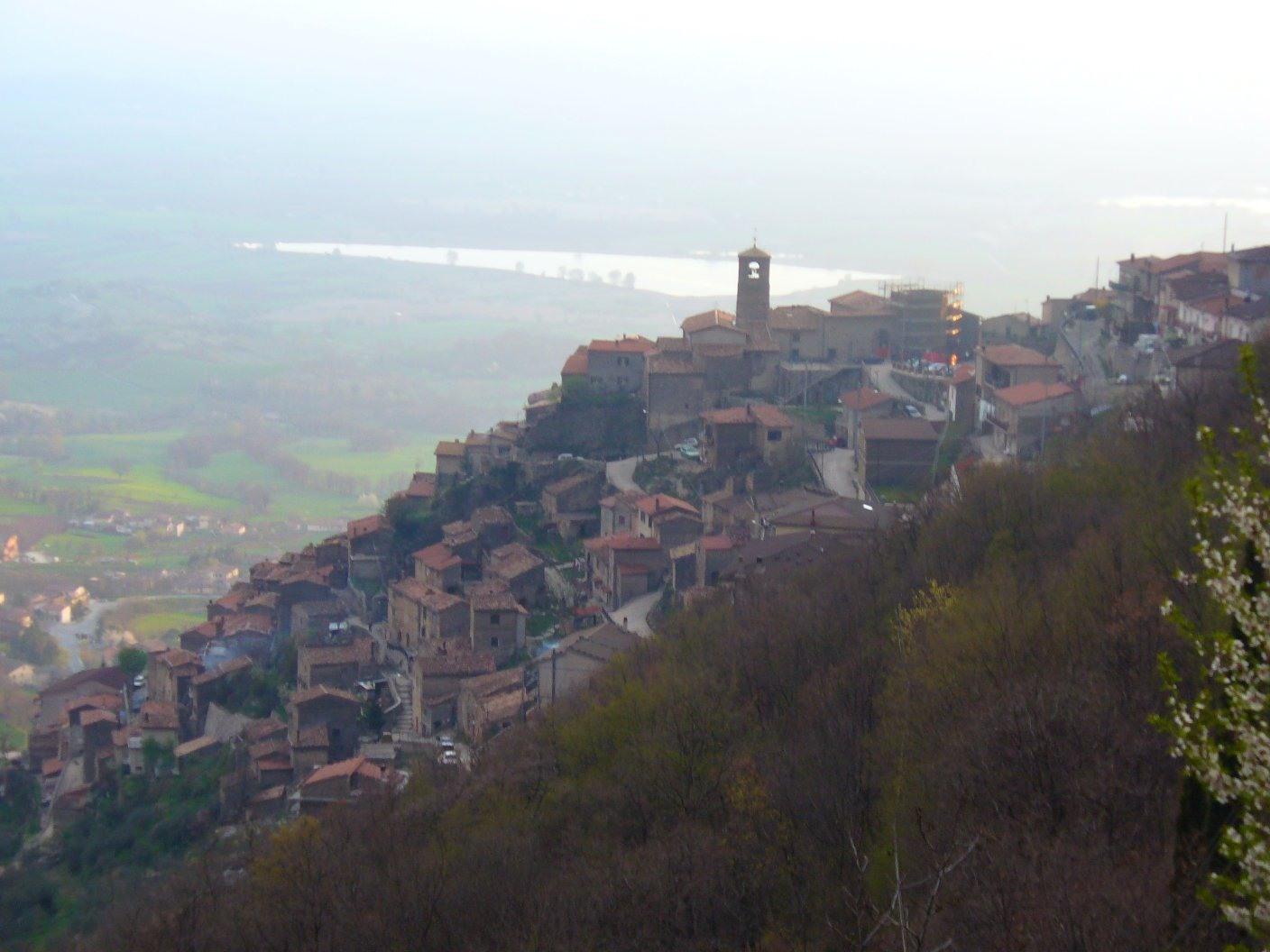
- View of Poggio Bustone

- Coat of arms

- Location within Italy Location within Lazio
- Coordinates: 42°30′N 12°53′E
- Country: Italy
- Region: Lazio
- Province: Rieti (RI)

Government
  - Mayor: Deborah Vitelli

Area
  - Total: 22.3 km^{2} (8.6 sq mi)
- Elevation: 756 m (2,480 ft)

Population (31 December 2015)
  - Total: 2,055
  - Density: 92.2/km^{2} (239/sq mi)
- Demonym: Poiani
- Time zone: UTC+1 (CET)
  - Summer (DST): UTC+2 (CEST)
- Postal code: 02018
- Dialing code: 0746
- Patron saint: St. John the Baptist
- Saint day: 24 June
- Website: Official website

Poggio Bustone (Poiano: Ru Poju) is a comune (municipality) in the Province of Rieti in the Italian region of Latium, located about 70 kilometres (43 miles) northeast of Rome and about 11 kilometres (7 mi) north of Rieti.

Poggio Bustone borders the following municipalities: Cantalice, Leonessa, Rieti, Rivodutri.

== St. Francis ==
St Francis of Assisi went to Poggio Bustone in 1208 and reputedly greeted the villagers by saying "buon giorno buona gente" (good morning good people) A gothic arch named "buon giorno" can be found in the village commemorating this event.

In the oldest section of the Franciscan monastery of Poggio Bustone, a room can be found where St. Francis stayed. On the mountainside above the village are seven small chapels containing, by tradition, impressions of objects relating to St. Francis, such as his knee. This path culminates with the small church Sacro Speco where St. Francis received forgiveness for his sins from the Archangel Gabriel.

== People ==
- Attilio Piccioni (1892–1976), politician
- Lucio Battisti (1943–1998), singer and songwriter
- Leda Battisti (born 1971), singer and songwriter

== Twin towns ==
- San Benedetto del Tronto, Italy, since 2009
