= Micigliano =

- Comune
- Comune di Micigliano
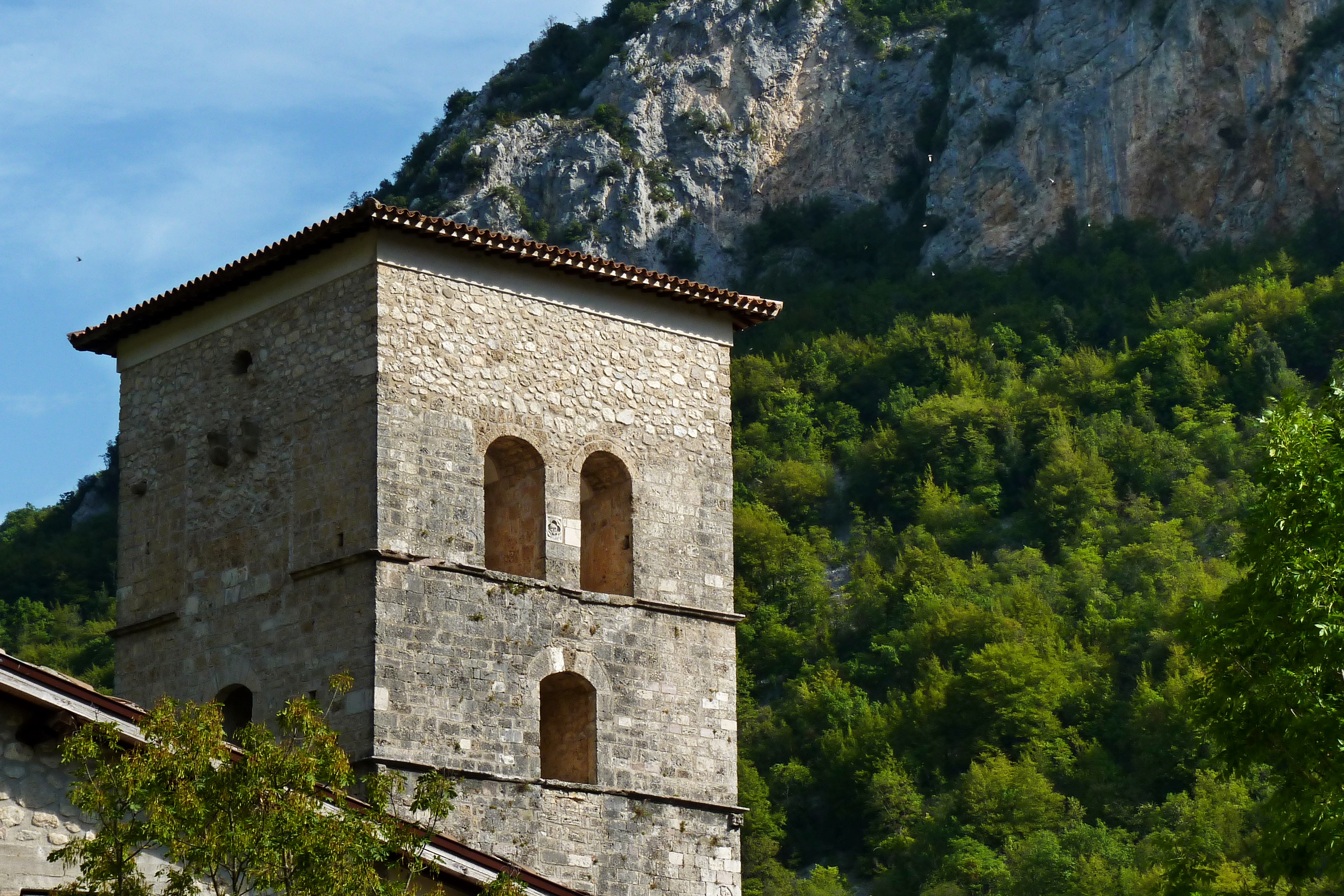
- View of Micigliano

- Location within Italy Location within Lazio
- Coordinates: 42°27′N 13°3′E
- Country: Italy
- Region: Lazio
- Province: Province of Rieti (RI)

Area
  - Total: 37.8 km^{2} (14.6 sq mi)
- Elevation: 925 m (3,035 ft)

Population (Dec. 2004)
  - Total: 146
  - Density: 3.86/km^{2} (10.0/sq mi)
- Time zone: UTC+1 (CET)
  - Summer (DST): UTC+2 (CEST)
- Postal code: 02010
- Dialing code: 0746

Micigliano is a comune (municipality) in the Province of Rieti found in the Italian region of Latium. It is located in about 80 kilometres (50 mi) northeast of Rome and about 15 kilometres (9 mi) northeast of Rieti. As of 31 December 2004, it had a population of 146 people and an area of 37.8 square kilometres (14.6 mi^{2}).

Micigliano borders the following municipalities: Antrodoco, Borbona, Borgo Velino, Cantalice, Castel Sant'Angelo, Cittaducale, Leonessa, Posta, Rieti.

== Demographic evolution ==
Historical population

Year	Pop.	±%
1861	757	—
1871	800	+5.7%
1881	776	−3.0%
1901	914	+17.8%
1911	808	−11.6%

Year	Pop.	±%
1921	808	+0.0%
1931	705	−12.7%
1936	686	−2.7%
1951	604	−12.0%
1961	427	−29.3%

Year	Pop.	±%
1971	295	−30.9%
1981	210	−28.8%
1991	149	−29.0%
2001	140	−6.0%

Source: Data from ISTAT
