= Torricella in Sabina =

- Comune
- Comune di Torricella in Sabina
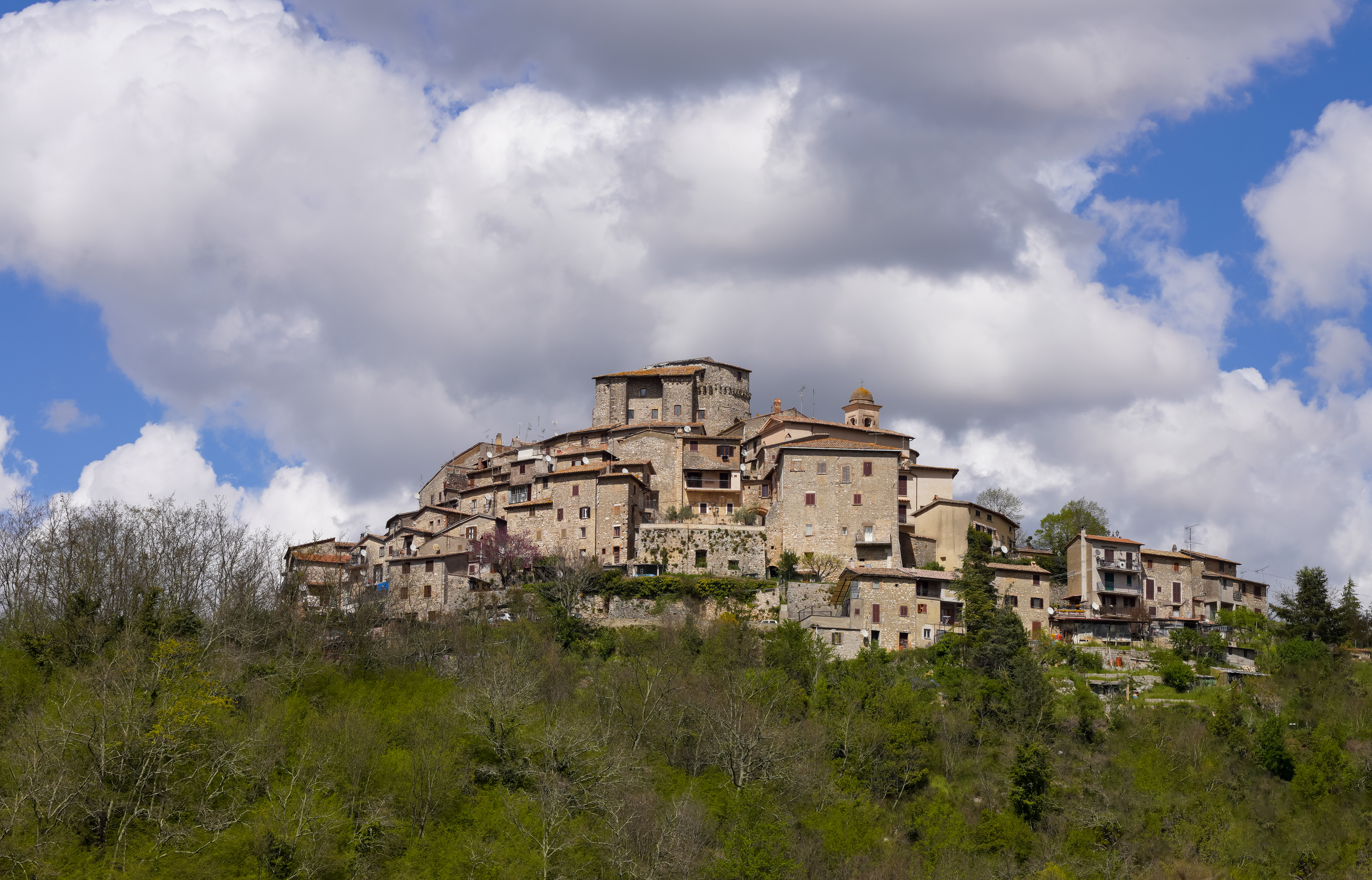
- View of Torricella in Sabina

- Coat of arms

- Location within Italy Location within Lazio
- Coordinates: 42°16′N 12°52′E
- Country: Italy
- Region: Lazio
- Province: Rieti (RI)
- Frazioni: Oliveto, Ornaro

Government
  - Mayor: Alessandro Iannelli

Area
  - Total: 25.8 km^{2} (10.0 sq mi)
- Elevation: 604 m (1,982 ft)

Population (2008)
  - Total: 1,362
  - Density: 52.8/km^{2} (137/sq mi)
- Demonym: Torricellani
- Time zone: UTC+1 (CET)
  - Summer (DST): UTC+2 (CEST)
- Postal code: 02030
- Dialing code: 0765

Torricella in Sabina is a comune (municipality) in the Province of Rieti in the Italian region of Latium, located about 50 kilometres (31 mi) northeast of Rome and about 15 kilometres (9 mi) south of Rieti.

Torricella in Sabina borders the following municipalities: Belmonte in Sabina, Casaprota, Monteleone Sabino, Montenero Sabino, Poggio Moiano, Poggio San Lorenzo, Rieti, Rocca Sinibalda. It is located near the ancient Via Salaria, and in the Middle Ages it was a possession of the Abbey of Farfa.

== See also ==
- Monti Sabini
