= Configni =

- Comune
- Comune di Configni
- Location within Italy Location within Lazio
- Coordinates: 42°25′N 12°38′E
- Country: Italy
- Region: Lazio
- Province: Rieti (RI)

Government
  - Mayor: Angelandrea Angelici

Area
  - Total: 22.69 km^{2} (8.76 sq mi)
- Elevation: 549 m (1,801 ft)

Population (30 June 2017)
  - Total: 620
  - Density: 27/km^{2} (71/sq mi)
- Demonym: Confignani
- Time zone: UTC+1 (CET)
  - Summer (DST): UTC+2 (CEST)
- Postal code: 02040
- Dialing code: 0746
- Website: Official website

Configni (Sabino: Convigni) is a comune (municipality) in the Province of Rieti in the Italian region of Latium, located about 60 kilometres (37 mi) north of Rome and about 20 kilometres (12 mi) west of Rieti.
