= Lago del Salto =

Artificial lake in Italy

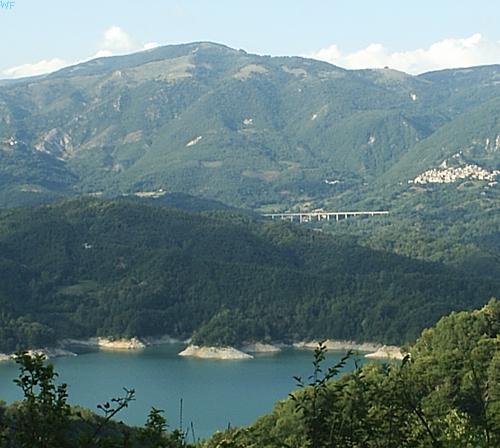

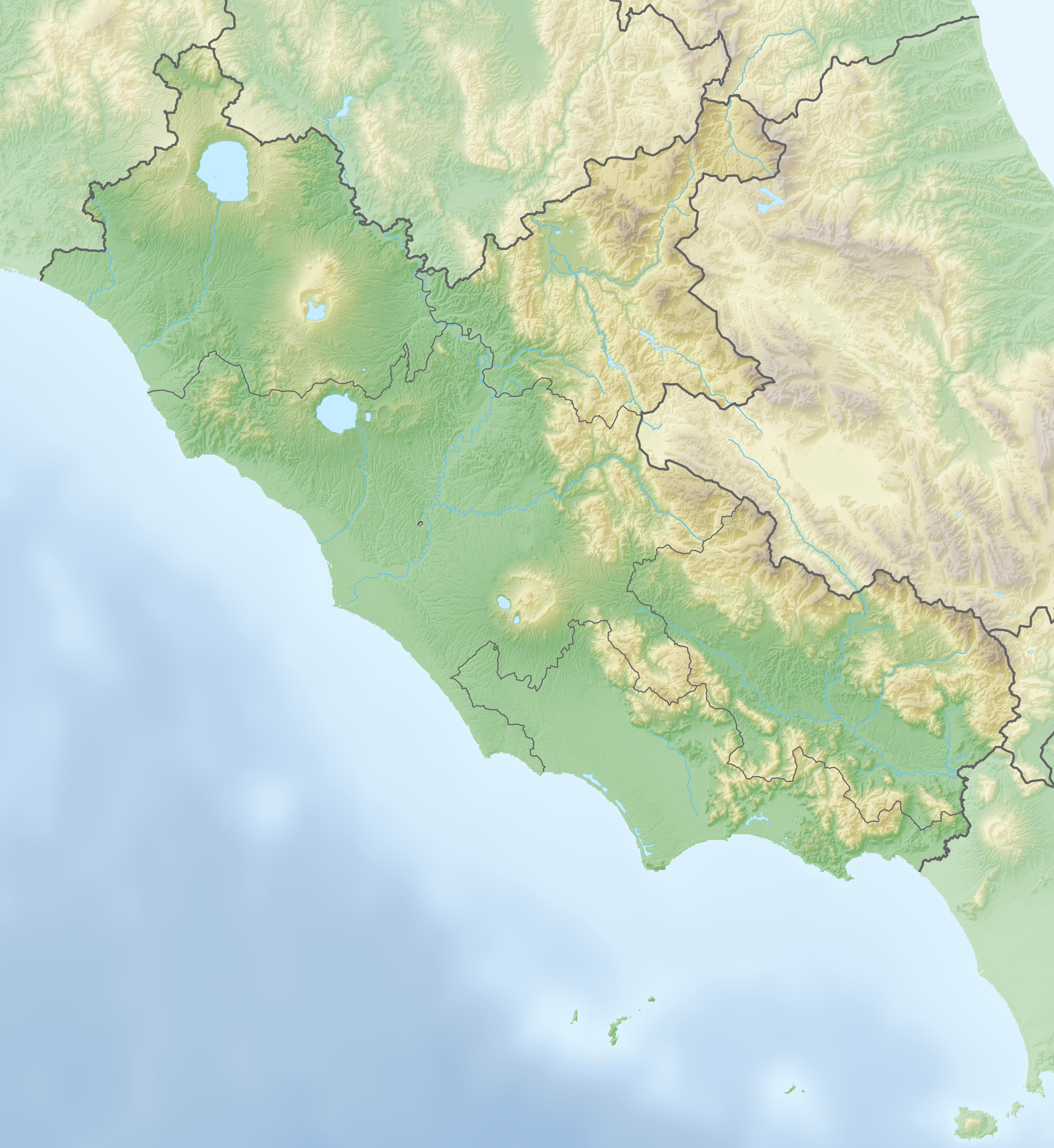
- Location within Lazio
- Location: Province of Rieti, Lazio
- Coordinates: 42.252537°N 13.067894°E
- Primary inflows: Salto River
- Primary outflows: Salto River
- Catchment area: 741 km^{2} (286 sq mi)
- Basin countries: Italy
- Surface area: 10 km^{2} (3.9 sq mi)
- Max. depth: 87.4 m (287 ft)
- Surface elevation: 535 m (1,755 ft)

Lago del Salto is a reservoir lake in the Province of Rieti, Lazio, Italy. At an elevation of 535 m, its surface area is 10 km².

== History ==
Lago del Salto was created in 1940 by the damming of the Salto River with the construction of the Salto Dam (Diga del Salto). The dam was built to generate hydroelectric power, which was crucial for Italy's industrial development during that period. The reservoir's creation resulted in the submersion of several small villages, whose inhabitants were relocated to higher ground.

== Geography ==
=== Location ===
The lake is situated in the Apennine Mountains, approximately 40 kilometers northeast of Rome. It lies at an elevation of 535 meters above sea level and covers an area of about 10 square kilometers.

=== Hydrology ===
The primary inflow of Lago del Salto is the Salto River, which originates in the Monti del Cicolano range. The lake is also fed by several smaller streams and seasonal torrents. The outflow from the lake continues as the Salto River, which eventually merges with the Turano River to form the Velino River.

=== Morphology ===
Lago del Salto has a highly irregular shape with numerous inlets and peninsulas, giving it a distinctive and picturesque appearance. The maximum depth of the lake is approximately 90 meters.

== Environment ==
=== Flora and Fauna ===
The lake and its surrounding area are rich in biodiversity. The shores of Lago del Salto are lined with forests of oak, chestnut, and beech trees. The lake itself supports a variety of fish species, including carp, pike, and perch, making it a popular destination for fishing enthusiasts. Birdwatchers can spot numerous bird species, such as herons, kingfishers, and various birds of prey.

=== Conservation ===
Efforts have been made to protect the natural environment of Lago del Salto. The area is subject to environmental regulations aimed at preserving its ecological balance and natural beauty. Sustainable tourism practices are encouraged to minimize human impact on the lake's ecosystem.

== Economic Importance ==
=== Hydroelectric Power ===
The primary purpose of Lago del Salto is the generation of hydroelectric power. The Salto Dam is operated by Enel, Italy's largest power company, and contributes significantly to the regional power grid.

=== Irrigation ===
The reservoir also plays a crucial role in irrigation, supporting agricultural activities in the surrounding areas. The water from Lago del Salto irrigates fields and orchards, contributing to the local economy.

=== Tourism and Recreation ===
Lago del Salto is a popular destination for tourists and outdoor enthusiasts. Activities such as boating, fishing, swimming, and hiking attract visitors year-round. The scenic beauty of the lake and its surroundings makes it a favored spot for nature lovers and photographers.

== Cultural Significance ==
=== Local Festivals ===
The communities around Lago del Salto celebrate various local festivals, many of which have historical roots tied to the lake and its resources. These festivals often include traditional music, food, and cultural performances.

=== Archaeological Sites ===
The area around Lago del Salto is rich in history, with several archaeological sites that date back to the Roman era. These sites offer insights into the ancient civilizations that once inhabited the region.

== Access ==
Lago del Salto is accessible by road, with several routes connecting it to major cities in the Lazio region. The nearest major city is Rieti, which is well-connected by public transportation. There are also numerous trails around the lake for hikers and nature enthusiasts.

== Conclusion ==
Lago del Salto is a vital resource for the Lazio region, providing hydroelectric power, irrigation, and recreational opportunities. Its natural beauty and rich biodiversity make it an important ecological and tourist destination. Efforts to preserve and protect the lake's environment ensure that it remains a valuable asset for future generations.
