= Cittareale =

- Comune
- Comune di Cittareale
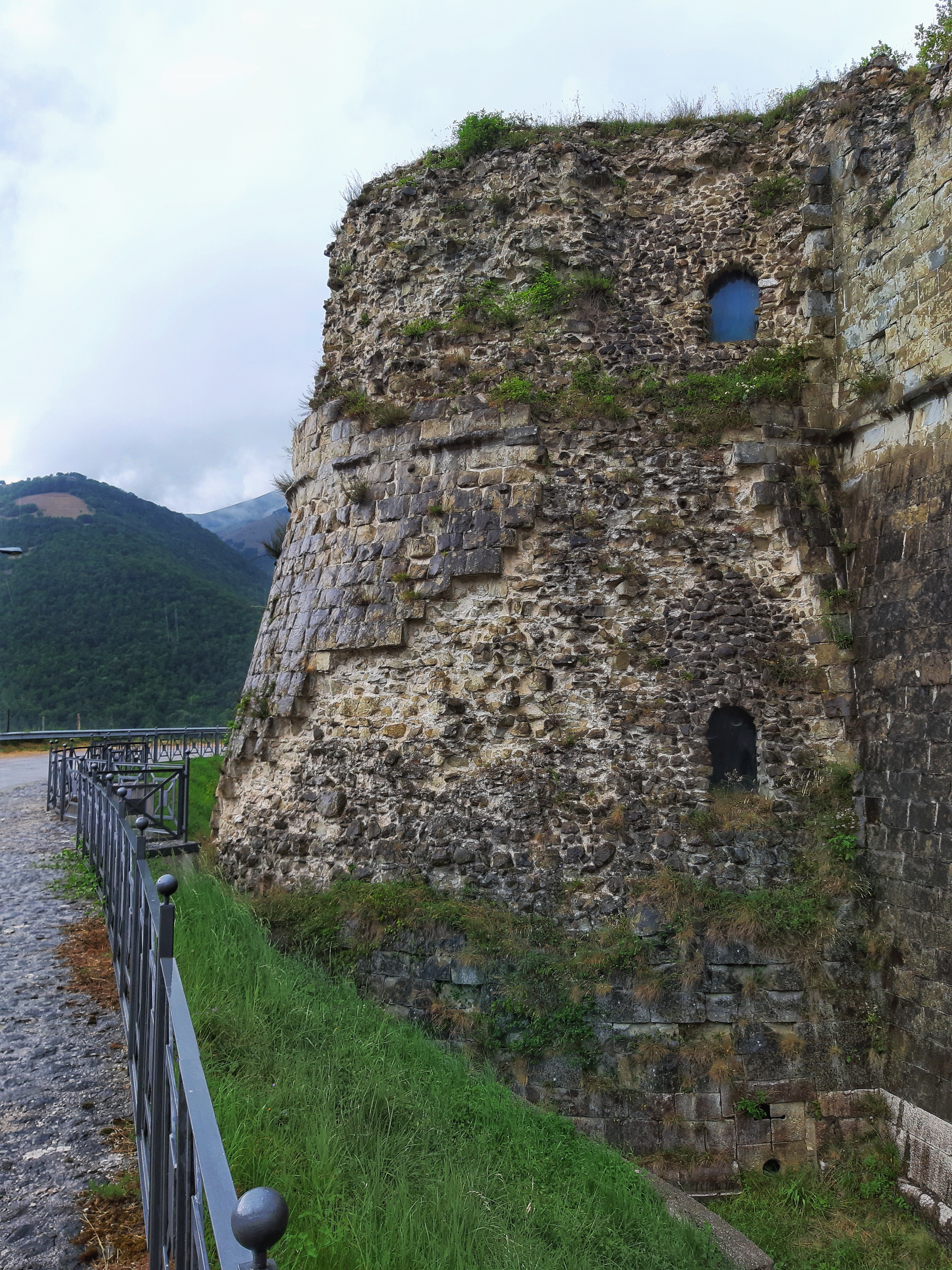
- View of Cittareale

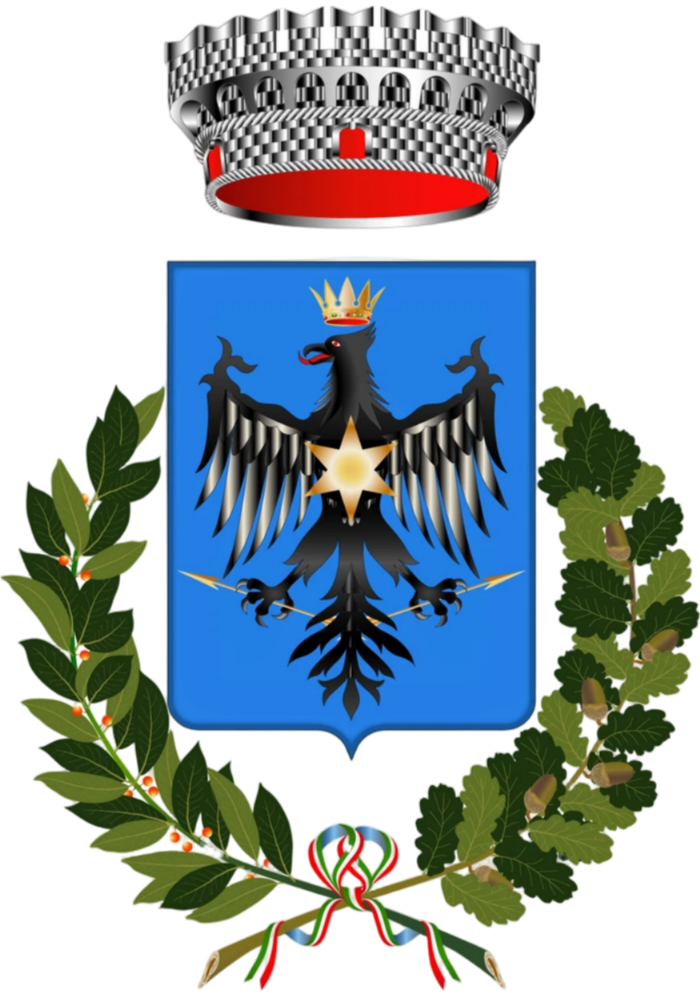
- Coat of arms

- Location within Italy Location within Lazio
- Coordinates: 42°37′N 13°10′E
- Country: Italy
- Region: Lazio
- Province: Rieti (RI)
- Frazioni: Ara dei Colli, Bricca, Cagnerone, Ca Jenco, Cesetta, Collenasso, Collicelle, Conca, Folcara, Le Rose, Marianitto, Matrecciano, Mola Coletta, Pallottini, Santa Croce, Santa Giusta, Sacco, Scanzano, Sorecone, Trimezzo, Vetozza, Vezzano

Government
  - Mayor: Giuseppe Fedele

Area
  - Total: 58.8 km^{2} (22.7 sq mi)
- Elevation: 952 m (3,123 ft)

Population (30 April 2008)
  - Total: 474
  - Density: 8.06/km^{2} (20.9/sq mi)
- Demonym: Cittarealesi
- Time zone: UTC+1 (CET)
  - Summer (DST): UTC+2 (CEST)
- Postal code: 02010
- Dialing code: 0746
- Website: Official website

Cittareale is a comune (municipality) in the Province of Rieti in the Italian region of Latium. It is located about 100 kilometres (62 mi) northeast of Rome and 35 kilometres (22 mi) northeast of Rieti.

Cittareale borders the following municipalities: Accumoli, Amatrice, Borbona, Cascia, Leonessa, Montereale, Norcia, Posta. The source of the Velino river are in the communal territory.

Cittareal is home to a large Rocca (castle), which had a strategical importance due to its position between the Kingdom of Naples and the Papal States. Its current appearance date to the reconstruction by the Aragonese in 1479. The church of St. Peter in Vetozza was built over a pre-existing temple dedicated to Vacuna, and later was owned by the Abbey of Farfa.

The Roman emperor Vespasian was born nearby.
