= Belmonte in Sabina =

- Comune
- Comune di Belmonte in Sabina
- Coat of arms

- Location within Italy Location within Lazio
- Coordinates: 42°19′N 12°54′E
- Country: Italy
- Region: Lazio
- Province: Rieti (RI)

Government
  - Mayor: Maria Castellani

Area
  - Total: 23.61 km^{2} (9.12 sq mi)
- Elevation: 756 m (2,480 ft)

Population (30 April 2008)
  - Total: 652
  - Density: 27.6/km^{2} (71.5/sq mi)
- Demonym: Belmontesi
- Time zone: UTC+1 (CET)
  - Summer (DST): UTC+2 (CEST)
- Postal code: 02020
- Dialing code: 0765

Belmonte in Sabina (Sabino: Bermonte) is a comune (municipality) in the Province of Rieti in the Italian region of Latium, located about 60 kilometres (37 mi) northeast of Rome and about 10 kilometres (6 mi) southeast of Rieti.
