= Posta, Lazio =

Posta
- Comune
- Comune di Posta
- Location within Italy Location within Lazio
- Coordinates: 42°31′N 13°6′E
- Country: Italy
- Region: Lazio
- Province: Province of Rieti (RI)
- Frazioni: Bacugno, Favischio, Figino, Fontarello, Picciame, Sigillo, Steccato, Villa Camponeschi

Area
  - Total: 66.5 km^{2} (25.7 sq mi)
- Elevation: 721 m (2,365 ft)

Population (December 2004)
  - Total: 819
  - Density: 12.3/km^{2} (31.9/sq mi)
- Demonym: Apositani
- Time zone: UTC+1 (CET)
  - Summer (DST): UTC+2 (CEST)
- Dialing code: 0746

Posta is a comune (municipality) in the Province of Rieti in the Italian region of Latium, located about 80 kilometres (50 mi) northeast of Rome and about 25 kilometres (16 mi) northeast of Rieti. As of 31 December 2004, it had a population of 819 and an area of 66.5 square kilometres (25.7 mi^{2}).

The municipality of Posta contains the frazioni (subdivisions, mainly villages and hamlets) Bacugno, Favischio, Figino, Fontarello, Picciame, Sigillo, Steccato and Villa Camponeschi.

Posta borders the following municipalities: Borbona, Cittareale, Leonessa, Micigliano, Montereale.

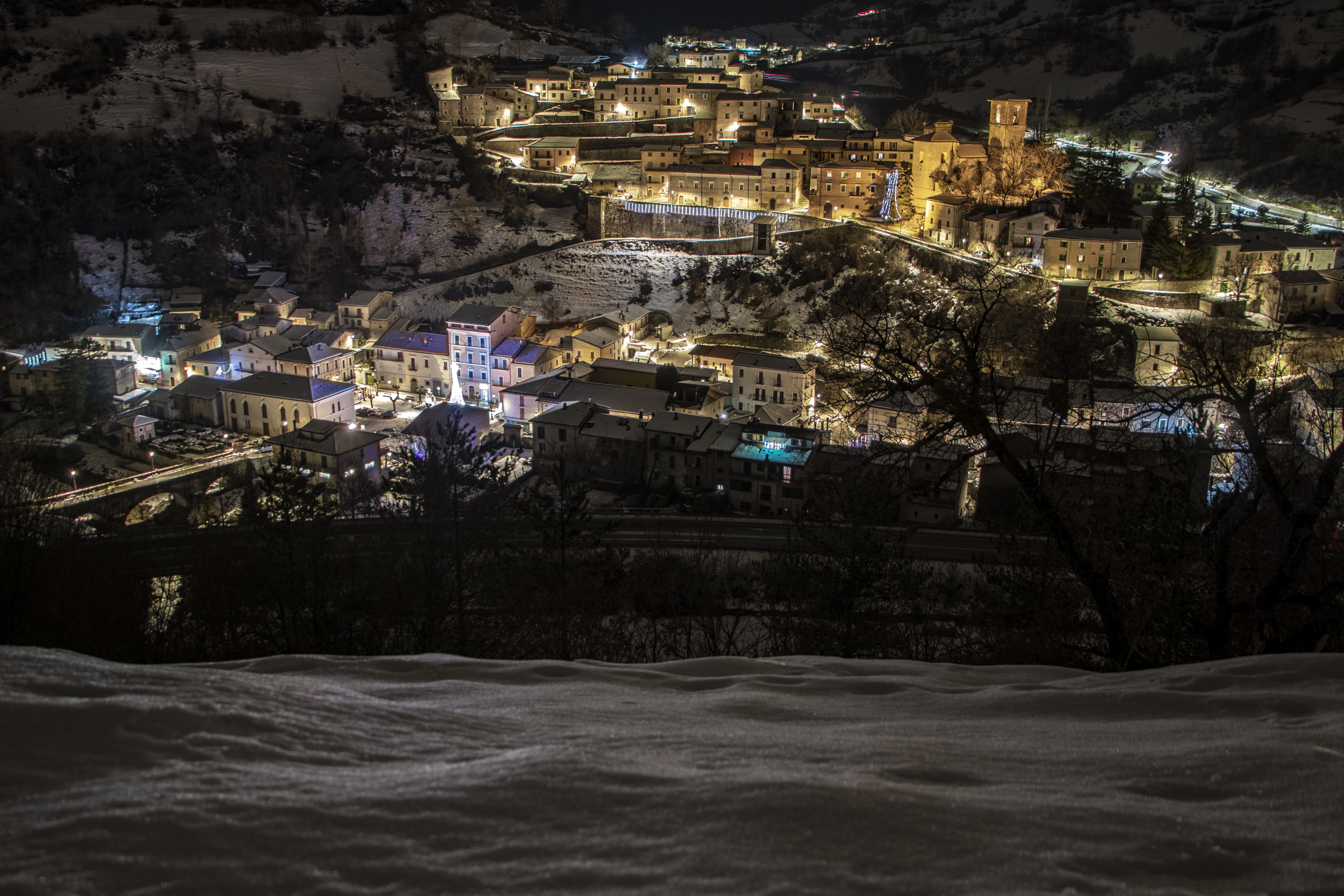

== Demographic evolution ==
Historical population

Year	Pop.	±%
1861	2,201	—
1871	2,284	+3.8%
1881	2,230	−2.4%
1901	2,436	+9.2%
1911	2,666	+9.4%

Year	Pop.	±%
1921	2,537	−4.8%
1931	2,427	−4.3%
1936	2,185	−10.0%
1951	1,919	−12.2%
1961	1,514	−21.1%

Year	Pop.	±%
1971	1,202	−20.6%
1981	1,056	−12.1%
1991	919	−13.0%
2001	824	−10.3%

Source: Data from ISTAT
