= Sabina (region) =

Historical region of central Italy

Coordinates: 42°24′15″N 12°51′24″E

- Traditional region
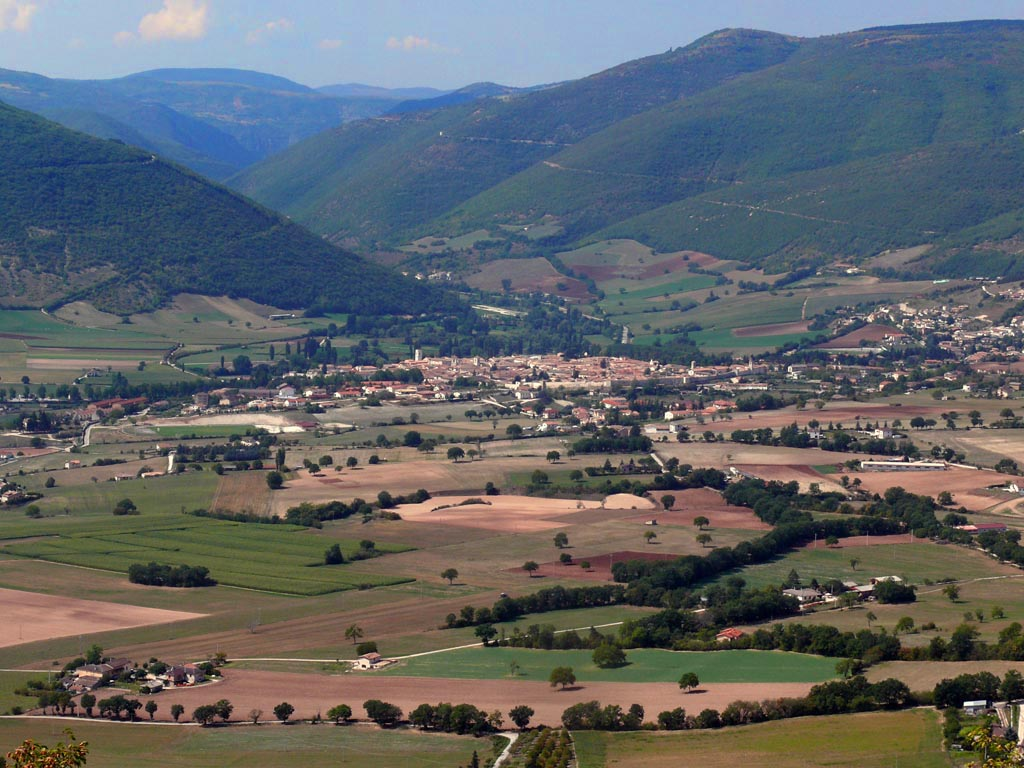
- Landscape of Sabina at Norcia.
- Interactive map of Sabina
- Country: Italy
- Elevation: 600 m (2,000 ft)

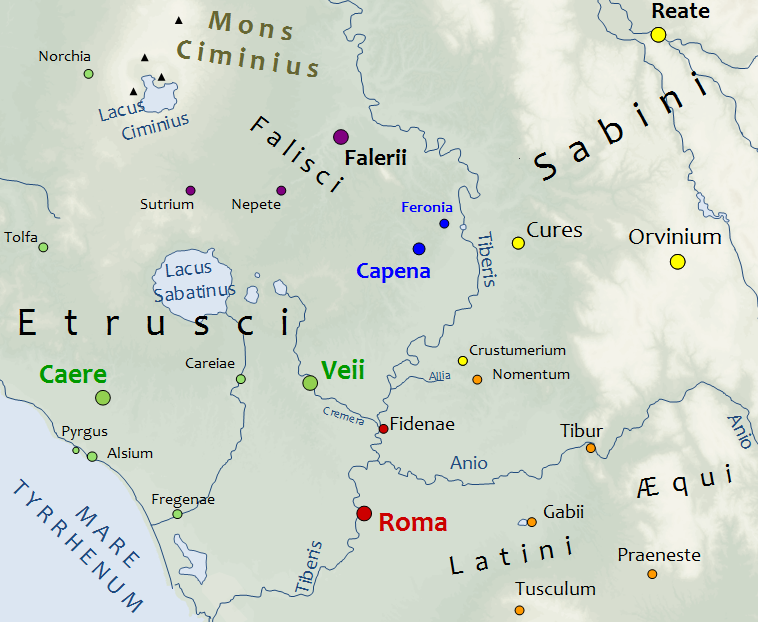
Sabine tribal area in 400 BC

Sabina (Latin: Sabinum), also called the Sabine Hills, is a region in central Italy. It is named after Sabina, the territory of the ancient Sabines, which was once bordered by Latium to the south, Picenum to the east, ancient Umbria to the north and Etruria to the west. It was separated from Umbria by the River Nar, today's Nera, and from Etruria by the River Tiber.

Today, Sabina is mainly northeast of Rome in the regions Lazio, Umbria and Abruzzo. Upper Sabina is in the province of Rieti (Poggio Mirteto, Magliano Sabina, Casperia, Montopoli di Sabina, Torri in Sabina, Cantalupo in Sabina, Montebuono, Forano, Poggio Catino, Montasola, Stimigliano, Castelnuovo di Farfa, Fara in Sabina, Roccantica, Mompeo, Salisano, Cottanello, Configni, Vacone, Tarano, Collevecchio, Toffia, Poggio Nativo, Scandriglia ecc.). Sabina Romana is in the province of Rome (Mentana, Monteflavio, Montelibretti, Monterotondo, Montorio Romano, Moricone, Nerola, Palombara Sabina). Part of Sabina is in the regions of Umbria (territories of Narni, Amelia, Cascia, Norcia, partially Upper Valnerina, etc.) and Abruzzo (from Valle dell'Aterno to L'Aquila).

== History ==
The Sabines who lived in two of the Seven Hills of Rome (the Quirinal and Viminal) formed part of the population of Rome (together with the Latins who lived on the other hills) at the time of its foundation. The second king of Rome, Numa Pompilius, was from Cures, the capital of Sabina.

During the reigns of the Roman kings Ancus Marcius and Tarquinius Priscus the Sabines attacked Roman territory several times. This also occurred during the early period of the Roman Republic.

After the Third Samnite War (298-290 BC), the Romans moved to crush the Sabines. The Roman consul Manius Curius Dentatus pushed deep into Sabina in the area between the rivers Nar (today’s Nera, the main tributary of the River Tiber) and Anio (Aniene, another tributary of the Tiber) and the source of the River Avens (Velino). Spurius Carvilius confiscated large tracts of land in the plain around Reate (today’s Rieti) and Amiternum (11 km from L'Aquila), which he distributed to Roman settlers. Florus did not give the reasons for this campaign. The modem historian Salmon speculates that "it might have been because of the part they [the Sabines] had played or failed to play in the events of 296/295 [BC]." That is, they let the Samnites cross their territory to go to Etruria and join forces with the Etruscans, Umbrians and Senone Gauls. Forsythe also speculates that it may have been a punishment for this. Livy mentioned that Dentatus subdued the rebellious Sabines. The Sabines were given citizenship without the right to vote (civitas sine suffragio), which meant that their territory was effectively annexed to the Roman Republic. Reate and Amiternum were given full Roman citizenship (civitas optimo iure) in 268 BC.

In the Augustan division of Italy, Sabina was included in the region IV Samnium. With Diocletian's late 3rd-century administrative reforms, Italy became a Roman diocese and was subdivided into Roman provinces. Sabina became part of the province of Samnium. Constantine the Great turned Italy into a praetorian prefecture and subdivided it into two dioceses. Sabina fell under the diocese of Italia suburbicaria as the province of Valeria. With the Lombard invasion of Italy in the Early Middle Ages, the territory of Sabina became part of the Lombard Duchy of Spoleto. With the Byzantine reconquest of central Italy, it came under the Duchy of Rome of the Byzantine Exarchate of Ravenna. With the rise of the Papal States, Sabina was governed directly by the pontificate or indirectly, by the counts of Sabina, a title of the noble Crescentii family in the 10th and 11th centuries. During the late 9th to early 10th century, the region was, along with much of central Italy, a stronghold of, or threatened by the Saracens.

== PDO Sabina extra virgin olive oil ==
The extra virgin olive oil Sabina is, chronologically speaking, the first Italian Protected Designation of Origin (PDO) oil to gain the certification from the European Community, the production of olives and oil is a millennial tradition in Sabine.

== Colli della Sabina DOC ==
In 1996, the Italian government designated the vineyards around the Sabine Hills as a DOC wine region eligible to produce red, white and rosé wine as well as some sweet sparkling wine from white grape varieties. The grapes are limited to a harvest yields of 12 tonnes/ha. Red and rosé wines are a blend of mostly 40–70% Sangiovese, 15–40% Montepulciano with other local varieties permitted up to 30%. The white wines are a blend of at least 40% Trebbiano and at least 40% Malvasia with other local grape varieties permitted to make up to 20% of the remaining blend. Red and rosé wines must have a minimum alcohol level of 11% with whites having a minimum of 10.5%.

== Suburbicarian bishopric ==
See also suburbicarian diocese.

Sabina has been the seat of a Catholic bishopric since the 6th century, though the earliest names in the list of bishops may be apocryphal.

The official papal province of Sabina was established under Pope Paul V in 1605. The Cardinal Bishop of Sabina is one of the six suburbicarian tituli (not counting Ostia) of the College of Cardinals which carry the rank of Cardinal Bishop.

Since 1925 the Cardinal Titular Church of Sabina has been joined to that of Poggio Mirteto, a municipality of the region, and officially named Sabina e Poggio Mirteto, since 1986 Sabina–Poggio Mirteto. The current (since 2000) Cardinal Bishop of Sabina-Poggio Mirteto is Giovanni Battista Re.

== Notable visitors ==
Henry James, American author, visited on horseback at the end of January 1872. The area was bright and alive. It was charged "to the supersensuous ear, with the murmur of an extinguished life". He also noted to his family that "I can stick on a horse better than I supposed".

== See also ==
- Sabines
- Strada dell'Olio
- Farfa Abbey
- Province of Rieti
- Province of Rome
- Santacittarama Buddhist Monastery
