= Poggio San Lorenzo =

- Comune
- Comune di Poggio San Lorenzo
- Coat of arms

- Location within Italy Location within Lazio
- Coordinates: 42°15′N 12°51′E
- Country: Italy
- Region: Lazio
- Province: Rieti (RI)

Government
  - Mayor: Andrea Eleuteri

Area
  - Total: 8.7 km^{2} (3.4 sq mi)
- Elevation: 494 m (1,621 ft)

Population (31 December 2013)
  - Total: 565
  - Density: 65/km^{2} (170/sq mi)
- Demonym: Poggiani
- Time zone: UTC+1 (CET)
  - Summer (DST): UTC+2 (CEST)
- Postal code: 02030
- Dialing code: 0765
- Website: Official website

Poggio San Lorenzo is a comune (municipality) in the Province of Rieti in the Italian region of Latium, located about 50 kilometres (31 mi) northeast of Rome and about 15 kilometres (9 mi) south of Rieti.

Poggio San Lorenzo borders the following municipalities: Casaprota, Frasso Sabino, Monteleone Sabino, Torricella in Sabina.
