= Salisano =

- Comune
- Comune di Salisano
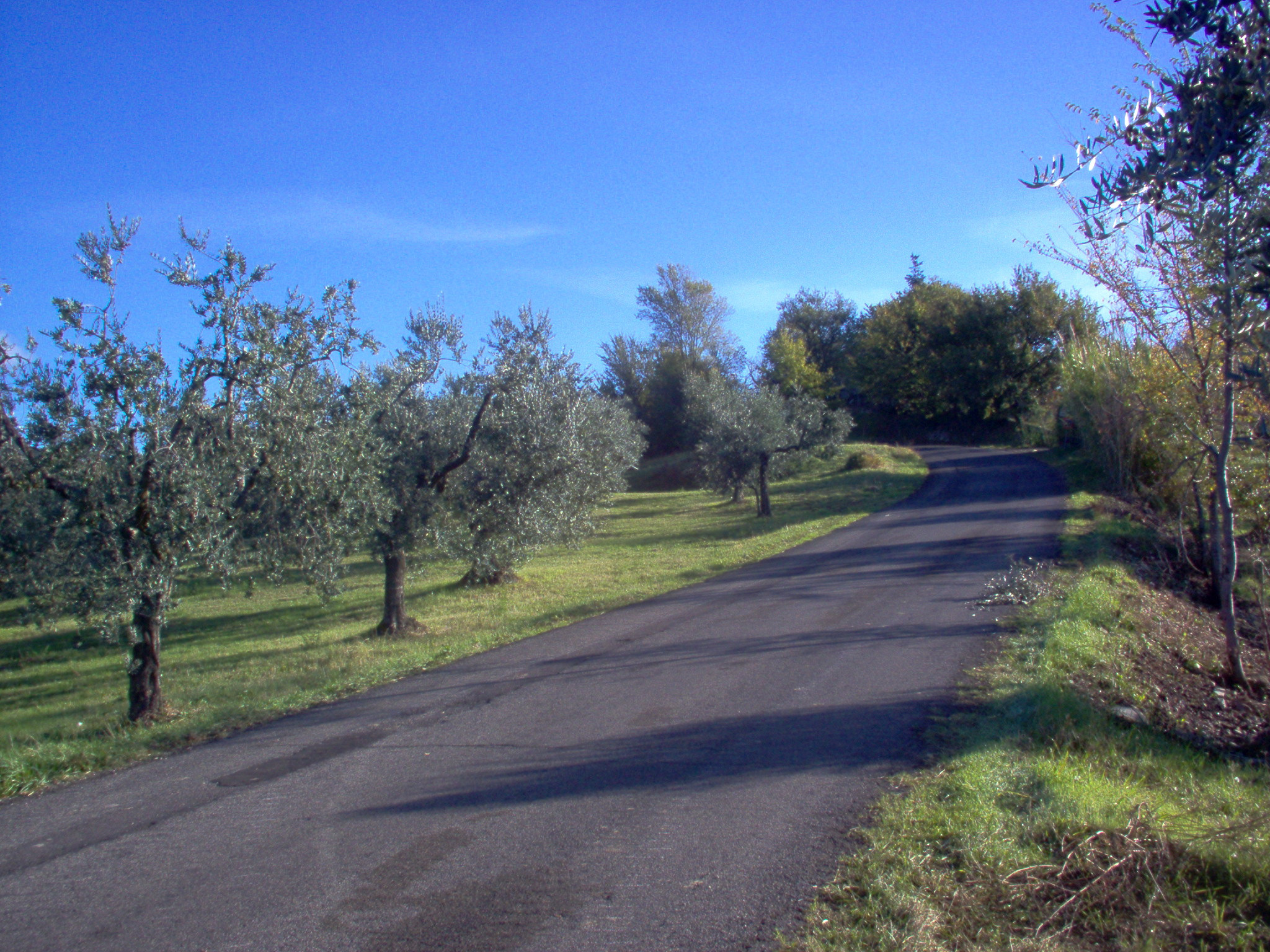
- A country road in Salisano.

- Coat of arms

- Location within Italy Location within Lazio
- Coordinates: 42°16′N 12°45′E
- Country: Italy
- Region: Lazio
- Province: Rieti (RI)

Government
  - Mayor: Gisella Petrocchi

Area
  - Total: 17.5 km^{2} (6.8 sq mi)
- Elevation: 460 m (1,510 ft)

Population (2008)
  - Total: 565
  - Density: 32.3/km^{2} (83.6/sq mi)
- Demonym: Salisanesi
- Time zone: UTC+1 (CET)
  - Summer (DST): UTC+2 (CEST)
- Postal code: 02040
- Dialing code: 0765
- Website: Official website

Salisano (Sabino: Saricianu) is a comune (municipality) in the Province of Rieti in the Italian region of Latium, located about 45 kilometres (28 mi) northeast of Rome and about 20 kilometres (12 mi) southwest of Rieti.
