= Cottanello =

- Comune
- Comune di Cottanello
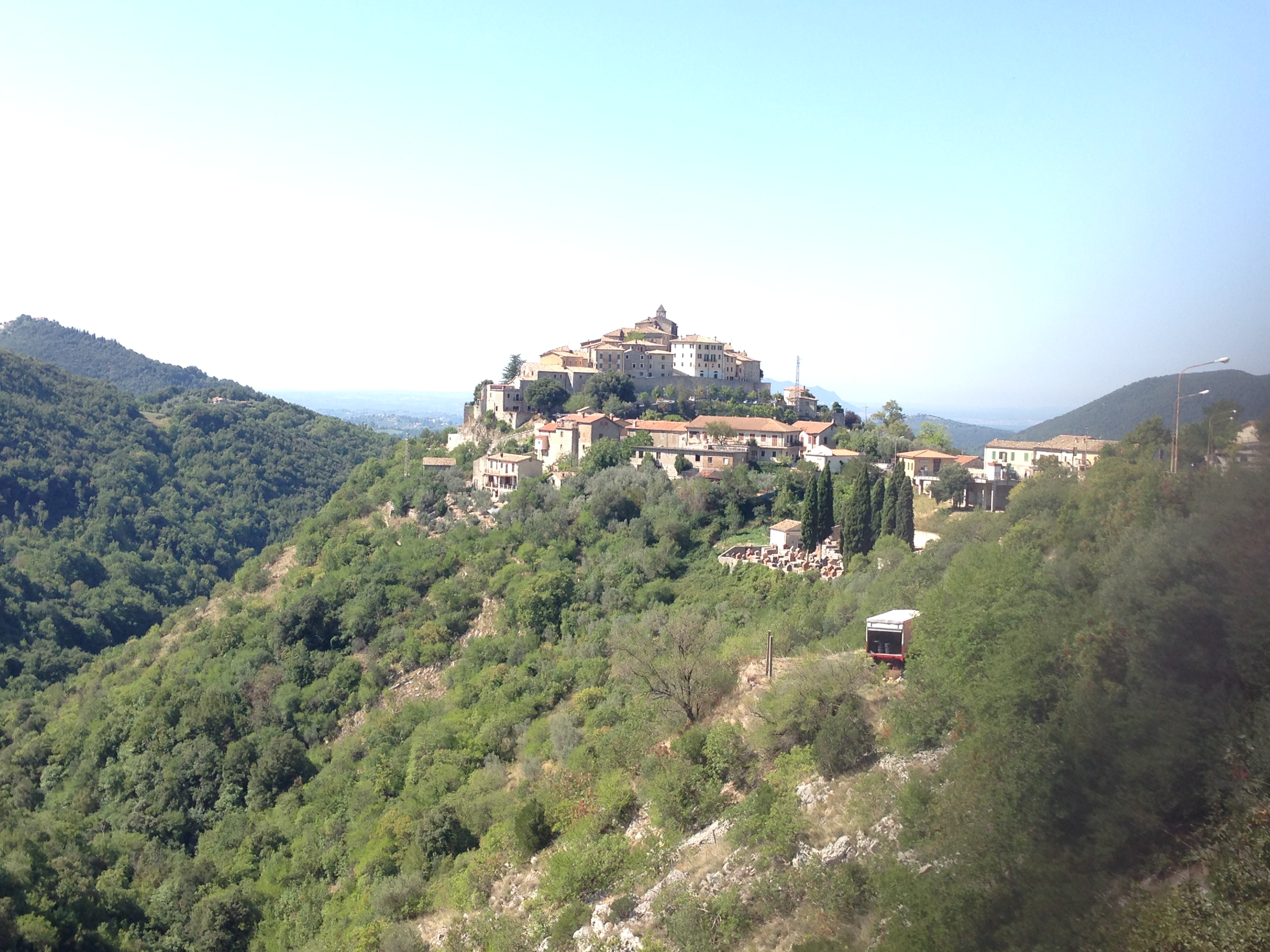
- View of Cottanello

- Location within Italy Location within Lazio
- Coordinates: 42°25′N 12°41′E
- Country: Italy
- Region: Lazio
- Province: Rieti (RI)
- Frazioni: Castiglione, Colle della Fonte, Le Piane

Government
  - Mayor: Roberto Angeletti

Area
  - Total: 36.4 km^{2} (14.1 sq mi)

Population (2018-01-01)
  - Total: 538
  - Density: 14.8/km^{2} (38.3/sq mi)
- Time zone: UTC+1 (CET)
  - Summer (DST): UTC+2 (CEST)
- Website: Official website

Cottanello is a comune (municipality) in the Province of Rieti in the Italian region of Latium, located about 60 kilometres (37 mi) north of Rome and about 15 kilometres (9 mi) west of Rieti.

An elaborate ancient Roman villa was discovered here in 1968 in the hamlet of Collesecco (evocative of an arid and stony place) in the valley below the historic centre of Cottanello. Subsequently a building was erected to protect the villa.

== Roman villa of Cottanello ==
Also known as the Roman Villa Cotta of Collesecco after its ancient owners, the Cotta family, and its location.

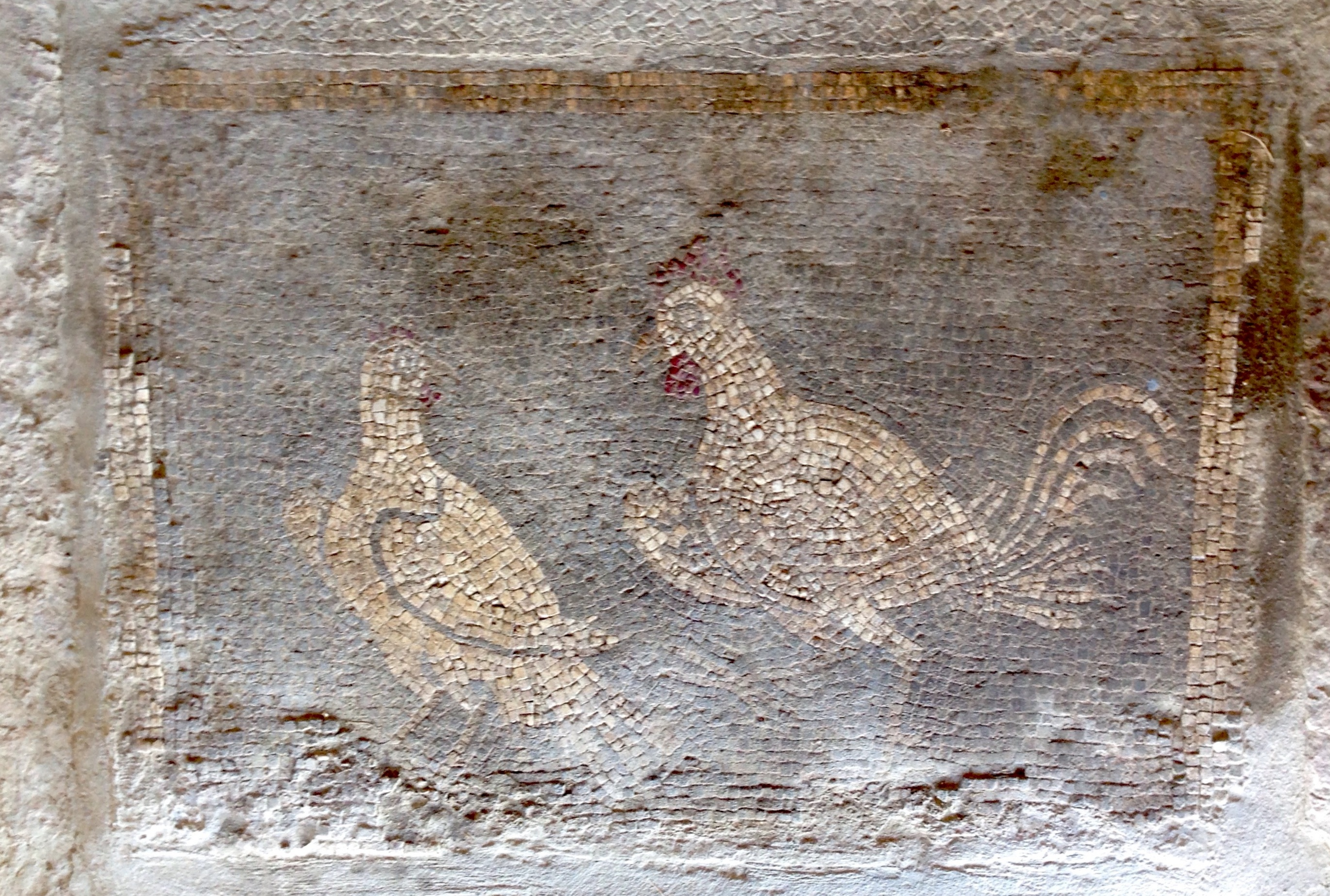
Mosaic from door threshold

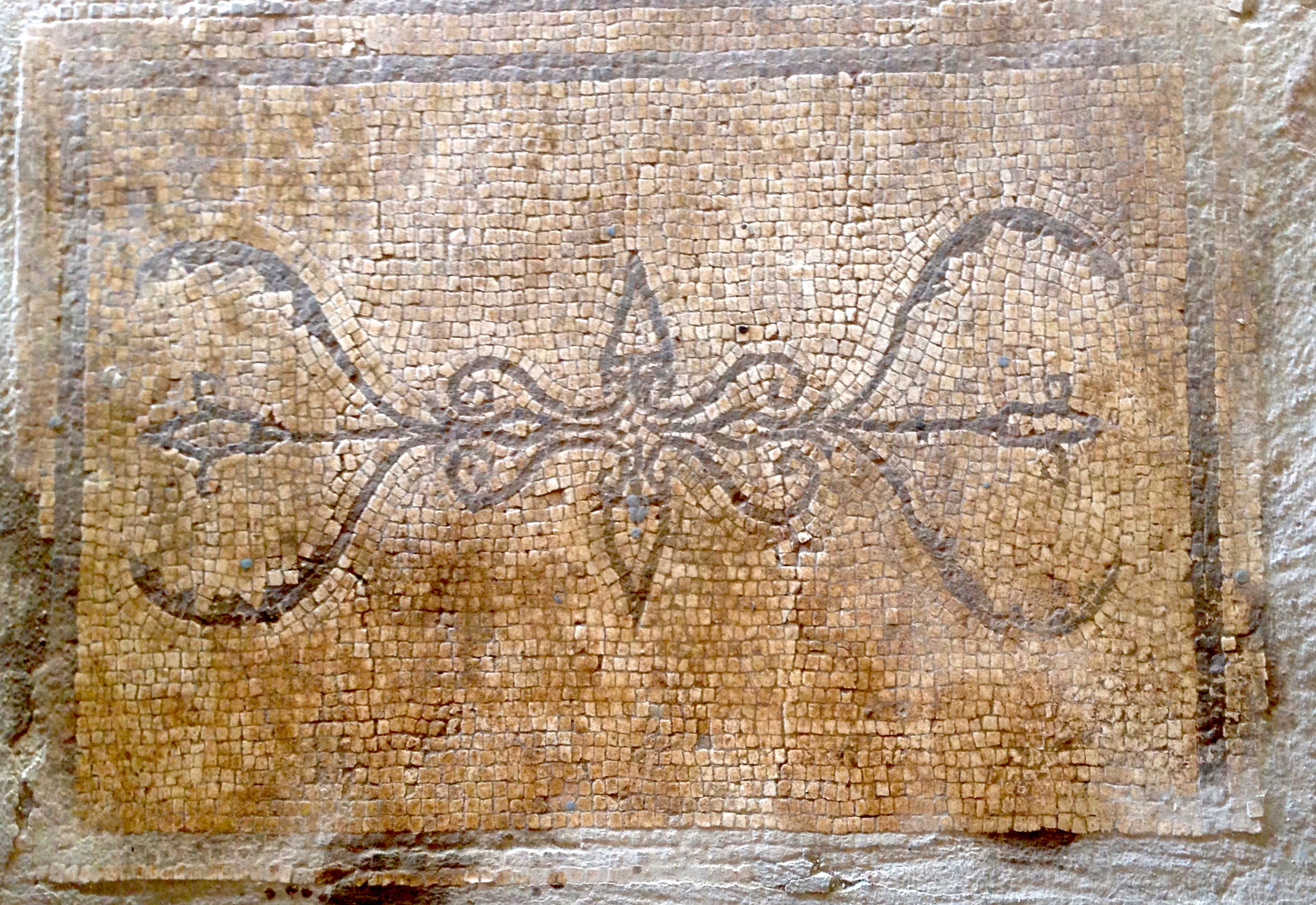
Mosaic from door threshold

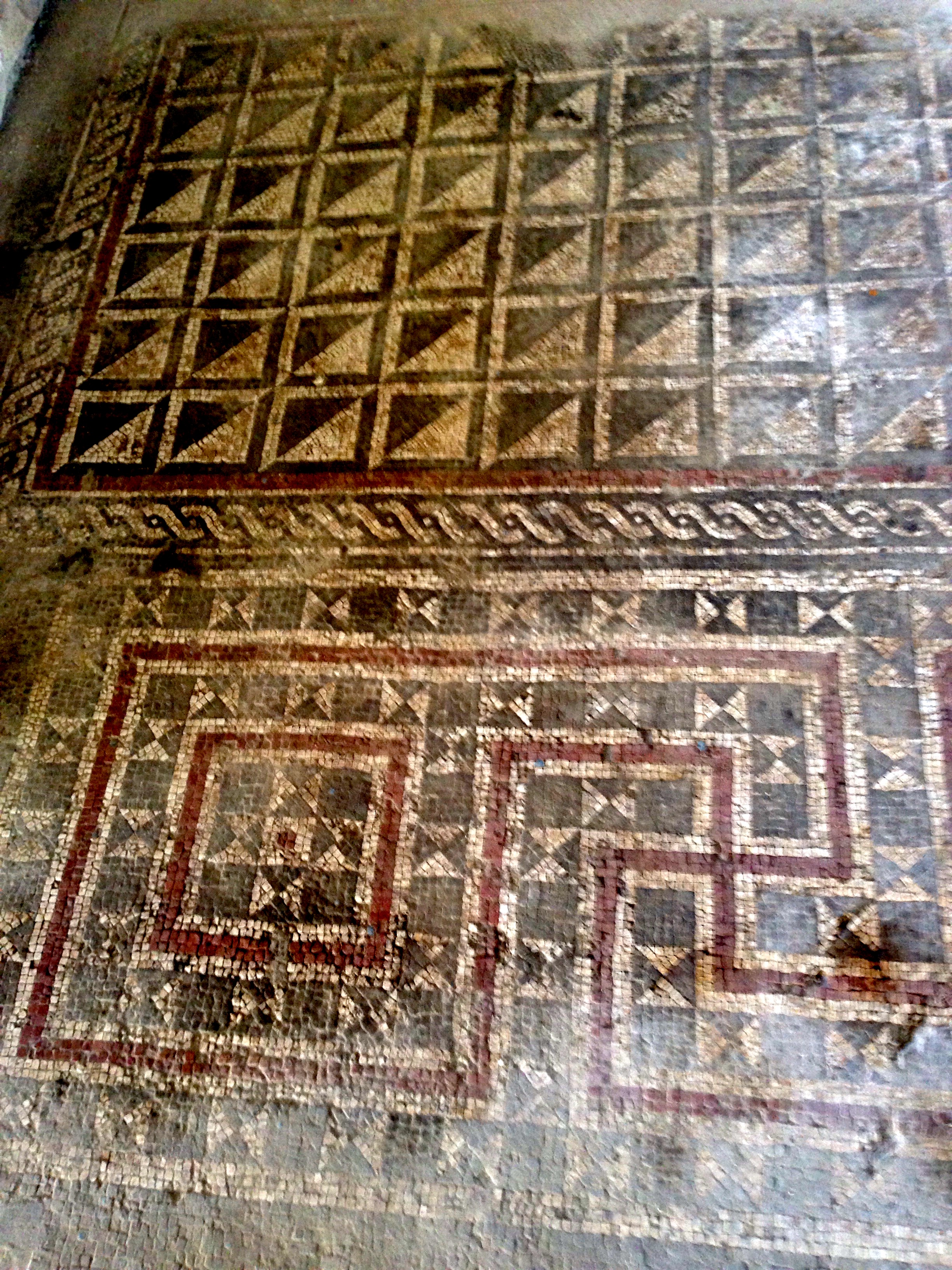
Mosaic floor

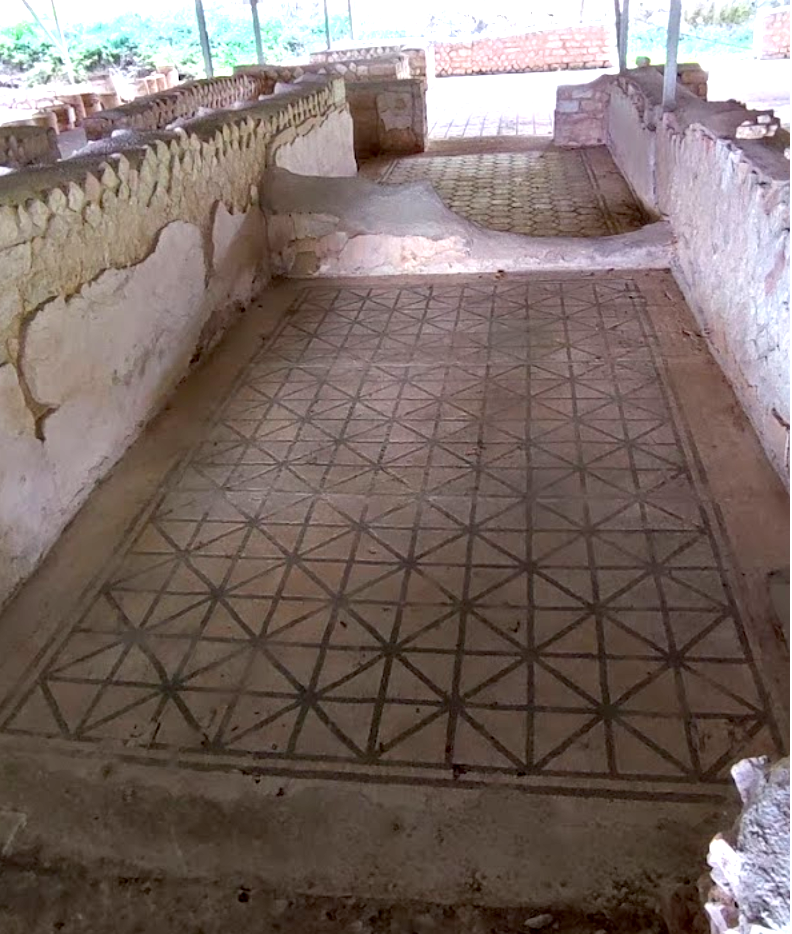

=== Description ===
The villa had a manor-type country residence part, embellished with sculptural decorations, architectural terracotta and excellently preserved geometric mosaic floors, made with local limestone and with Cottanello red marble. The villa has an area of about 37 x 45 m and is composed of about 30 rooms with an atrium and a peristyle. One of the door thresholds has figured inserts with plant motifs, another depicts a pair of chanterelles. The walls are covered with painted plaster; some remains of stucco decoration are evident.

There was also a slave-run farm for food production.

The villa comprises:

- atrium of Tuscan-style with a mosaic floor with white crosses on a black background; rainwater collected in the quadrangular impluvium with a flat bottom in opus spicatum, and from here it was distributed to the adjacent baths
- tablinum, a passage room between the atrium and the peristyle
- bedrooms (cubicula) adjacent to the tablinum with a mosaic floor
- peristyle, or open inner courtyard surrounded by a columned portico
- summer triclinium, or dining room, with a black and white mosaic floor;
- 3 rooms on the southern side of the peristyle; halls and kitchen, once communicating with the atrium
- Baths suite including frigidarium with a cold bath; calidarium, or heated room with an apse on the shorter side; tepidarium with a warm or steam bath
- monumental cryptoporticus with barrel vault, investigated only for about 36 m, supports the floor and crosses a large part of the villa; it was probably used as a warehouse.

So far about half of the total area of the villa is known. On the slopes of Monte del Parro an underground aqueduct has been identified which brought water to the villa from the spring near Cola Fonte.

=== History ===
The villa is one of the numerous Roman villas in the Sabina area. Sabina Tiberina is its northern half which had only one Roman town, Forum Novum, founded by the Romans after the conquest of the Sabines in the early 3rd century BC to provide a market town for the farms of the region. By the 1st century AD the town, although still small, had been raised to a Roman municipium, but the region's lack of Roman urban centres was compensated by at least several dozen known extensive Roman villa-estates. The landowners at this time no longer lived in these properties all year, but spent their holidays there in luxury and with many of the comforts of city life. Roman aristocrats often owned several of these villas in Italy, and visited each over the year to check on business and also to enjoy hunting, reading, writing and the rural life. The farms on these estates typically produced lucrative crops that were sold to the cities including olives, grapes (for wine), and even game or other edible luxuries such as snails, fish, and small birds.

Thus the villa was built in the last decades of the 1st century AD on an existing structure of the Republican age.

The most recent excavations have determined at least 3 construction phases:

- from the end of the 2nd to the 1st century BC; the decorative aspects of some rooms such as the cocciopesto floor and the painted plaster suggest a building with some luxurious parts, as well as agricultural
- between the end of the 1st century BC and the first half of the 2nd century AD: considerable extensions and structural changes, such as the construction of the peristyle and spa rooms.
- phase without significant building works, but with occupation until late antiquity.

The name Cottanello is evidently connected to this villa which was owned by the powerful senatorial family of the Aurelii Cottae, as evidenced by a fragment of a dolium stamped with "M. Cottae". (Gaius Aurelius Cotta (consul 252 BC) is remembered as the builder of the ancient Via Aurelia) and it certainly belonged to the general Lucius Aurunculeius Cotta who died fighting for Caesar in 54 BC. It also may have belonged to Maximus Messalinus Cotta, consul in 20 AD, friend of Tiberius and author of writings on agronomy.

=== Excavations ===
In 1944 the retreating Germans blew up a huge ammunition dump here which exposed archaeological fragments which were later investigated by local amateur archaeologists. From local stories they became aware of the existence of underground buildings and of found amphorae and dolii which confirmed ancient ruins scattered over a large area.

After they tried to interest the authorities with little success, they began to unofficially excavate themselves in 1968. After the collapse of a part of the cryptoporticus, limestone walls emerged and a mosaic floor. After their establishment of an official Association in 1969 they were able to begin excavations that lasted until 1973.

In 1973 (and later in 1988) the floors were sectioned into panels, detached, and then repositioned and joined with cement and mortar; this compromised the recognition of traces useful for understanding the history prior to construction; it also unfortunately sealed the ancient water and sewer system. As stratigraphic criteria were not followed, the excavations lost information on the construction phases and on the functions of the rooms.

Excavations in 2010-12 by La Sapienza University of Rome and in 2013-14 by the Institute of Studies on the Ancient Mediterranean of the CNR have been able to investigate intact stratigraphy and analyse wall structures.

== Other sights ==
Nearby are the abandoned quarries of marble called Marmo di Cottonello, known in ancient times and widely used in Rome (also in St. Peter's Basilica)
