= Borbona =

- Comune
- Comune di Borbona
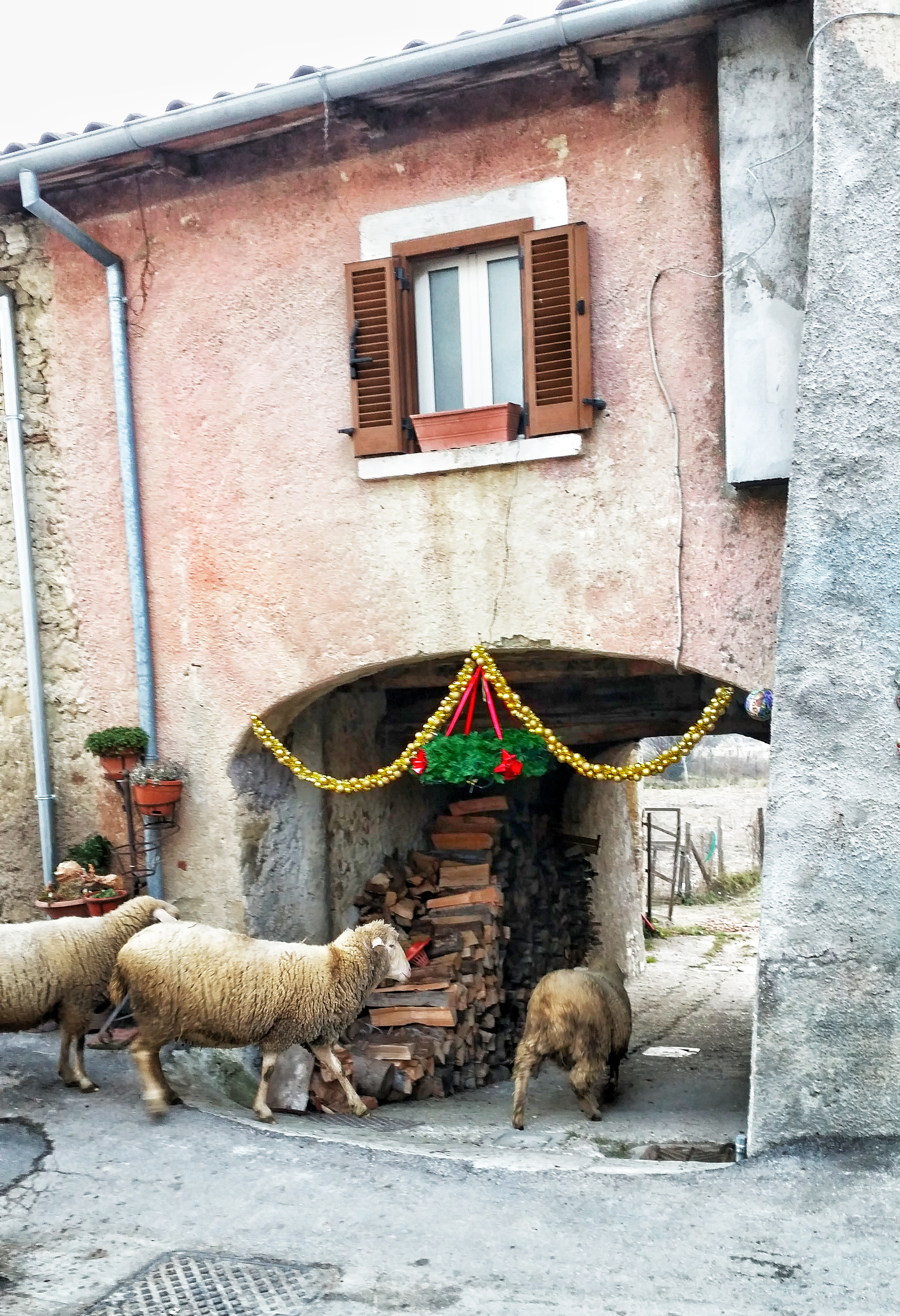
- View of Borbona

- Coat of arms

- Location within Italy Location within Lazio
- Coordinates: 42°31′N 13°8′E
- Country: Italy
- Region: Lazio
- Province: Rieti (RI)
- Frazioni: Piedimordenti, Vallemare

Government
  - Mayor: Maria Antonietta Di Gaspare

Area
  - Total: 47.96 km^{2} (18.52 sq mi)
- Elevation: 760 m (2,490 ft)

Population (31 January 2022)
  - Total: 594
  - Density: 12.4/km^{2} (32.1/sq mi)
- Demonym: Borbontini
- Time zone: UTC+1 (CET)
  - Summer (DST): UTC+2 (CEST)
- Postal code: 02010
- Dialing code: 0746
- ISTAT code: 057006
- Patron saint: santa Restituta
- Saint day: 27 May
- Website: Official website

Borbona is a comune (municipality) in the province of Rieti, in the Italian region of Latium, located about 90 kilometres (56 mi) northeast of Rome and about 25 kilometres (16 mi) northeast of Rieti.

Borbona borders the following municipalities: Antrodoco, Cagnano Amiterno, Cittareale, Micigliano, Montereale, Posta.

== Twin towns ==
- Gmina Poronin, Poland
