= Castelnuovo di Farfa =

- Comune
- Comune di Castelnuovo di Farfa
- Coat of arms

- Location within Italy Location within Lazio
- Coordinates: 42°14′N 12°45′E
- Country: Italy
- Region: Lazio
- Province: Rieti (RI)

Government
  - Mayor: Luca Zonetti

Area
  - Total: 8.84 km^{2} (3.41 sq mi)
- Elevation: 358 m (1,175 ft)

Population (30 June 2017)
  - Total: 1,048
  - Density: 119/km^{2} (307/sq mi)
- Demonym: Castelnovesi
- Time zone: UTC+1 (CET)
  - Summer (DST): UTC+2 (CEST)
- Postal code: 02031
- Dialing code: 0765
- Patron saint: St. Nicholas
- Saint day: December 6
- Website: Official website

Castelnuovo di Farfa is a comune (municipality) in the Province of Rieti in the Italian region of Latium, located about 40 kilometres (25 miles) northeast of Rome and about 20 kilometres (12 mi) southwest of Rieti.
