= Monte San Giovanni in Sabina =

- Comune
- Comune di Monte San Giovanni in Sabina
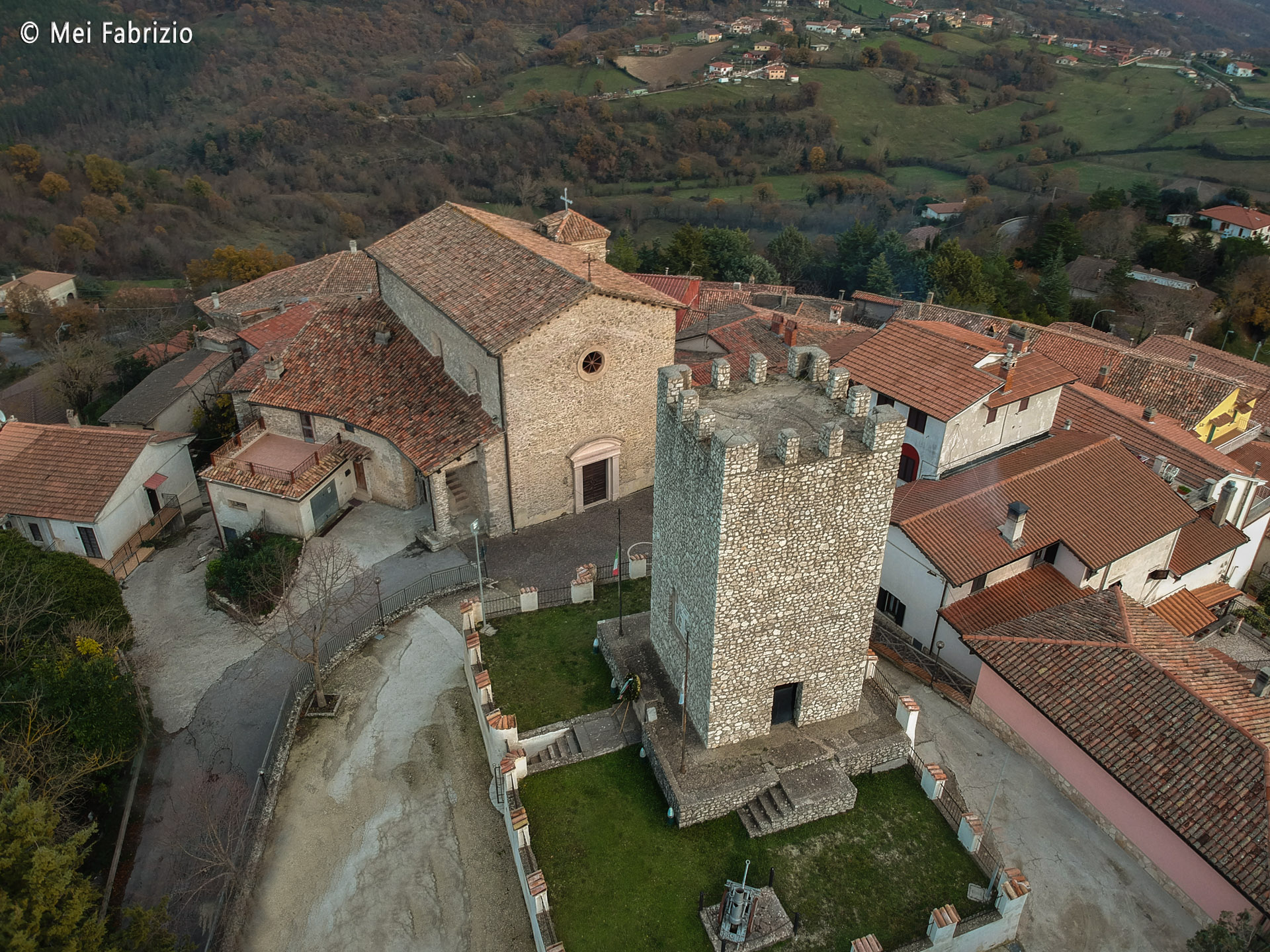
- View of Monte San Giovanni in Sabina

- Coat of arms

- Location within Italy Location within Lazio
- Coordinates: 42°20′N 12°47′E
- Country: Italy
- Region: Lazio
- Province: Rieti (RI)

Government
  - Mayor: Salvatore Mei

Area
  - Total: 30.76 km^{2} (11.88 sq mi)
- Elevation: 728 m (2,388 ft)

Population (30 November 2017)
  - Total: 684
  - Density: 22.2/km^{2} (57.6/sq mi)
- Demonym: Sangiovannesi
- Time zone: UTC+1 (CET)
  - Summer (DST): UTC+2 (CEST)
- Postal code: 02040
- Dialing code: 0765
- Website: Official website

Monte San Giovanni in Sabina is a comune (municipality) in the Province of Rieti in the Italian region of Latium, located about 50 kilometres (31 mi) northeast of Rome and about 10 kilometres (6 mi) southwest of Rieti.

It is located on a ridge of the Monti Sabini. The town grew around a walled castle, which was first mentioned in 1240.
