= Mompeo =

- Comune
- Comune di Mompeo
- Coat of arms

- Location within Italy Location within Lazio
- Coordinates: 42°15′N 12°45′E
- Country: Italy
- Region: Lazio
- Province: Rieti (RI)
- Frazioni: Madonna del Mattone

Government
  - Mayor: Silvana Forniti

Area
  - Total: 10.9 km^{2} (4.2 sq mi)
- Elevation: 457 m (1,499 ft)

Population (2008)
  - Total: 548
  - Density: 50.3/km^{2} (130/sq mi)
- Demonym: Mompeani
- Time zone: UTC+1 (CET)
  - Summer (DST): UTC+2 (CEST)
- Postal code: 02040
- Dialing code: 0765
- Patron saint: Sant'Egidio
- Saint day: September 1

Mompeo is a comune (municipality) in the Province of Rieti in the Italian region of Latium, located about 45 kilometres (28 mi) northeast of Rome and about 20 kilometres (12 mi) southwest of Rieti.
