= Cantalice =

- Comune
- Comune di Cantalice
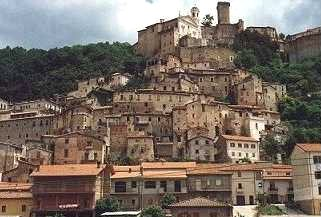

- Location within Italy Location within Lazio
- Coordinates: 42°28′N 12°54′E
- Country: Italy
- Region: Lazio
- Province: Rieti (RI)
- Frazioni: Capolaterra, Civitella, Collemare, Colli, Cruciano, San Liberato, Santa Margherita

Government
  - Mayor: Paolo Patacchiola

Area
  - Total: 37.7 km^{2} (14.6 sq mi)
- Elevation: 660 m (2,170 ft)

Population (30 April 2008)
  - Total: 2,832
  - Density: 75.1/km^{2} (195/sq mi)
- Demonym: Cantaliciani
- Time zone: UTC+1 (CET)
  - Summer (DST): UTC+2 (CEST)
- Postal code: 02014
- Dialing code: 0746
- Patron saint: San Felice
- Saint day: May 18
- Website: Official website

Cantalice is a comune (municipality) in the Province of Rieti in the Italian region of Latium, located about 70 kilometres (43 mi) northeast of Rome and about 8 kilometres (5 mi) northeast of Rieti.
