= Casaprota =

- Comune
- Comune di Casaprota
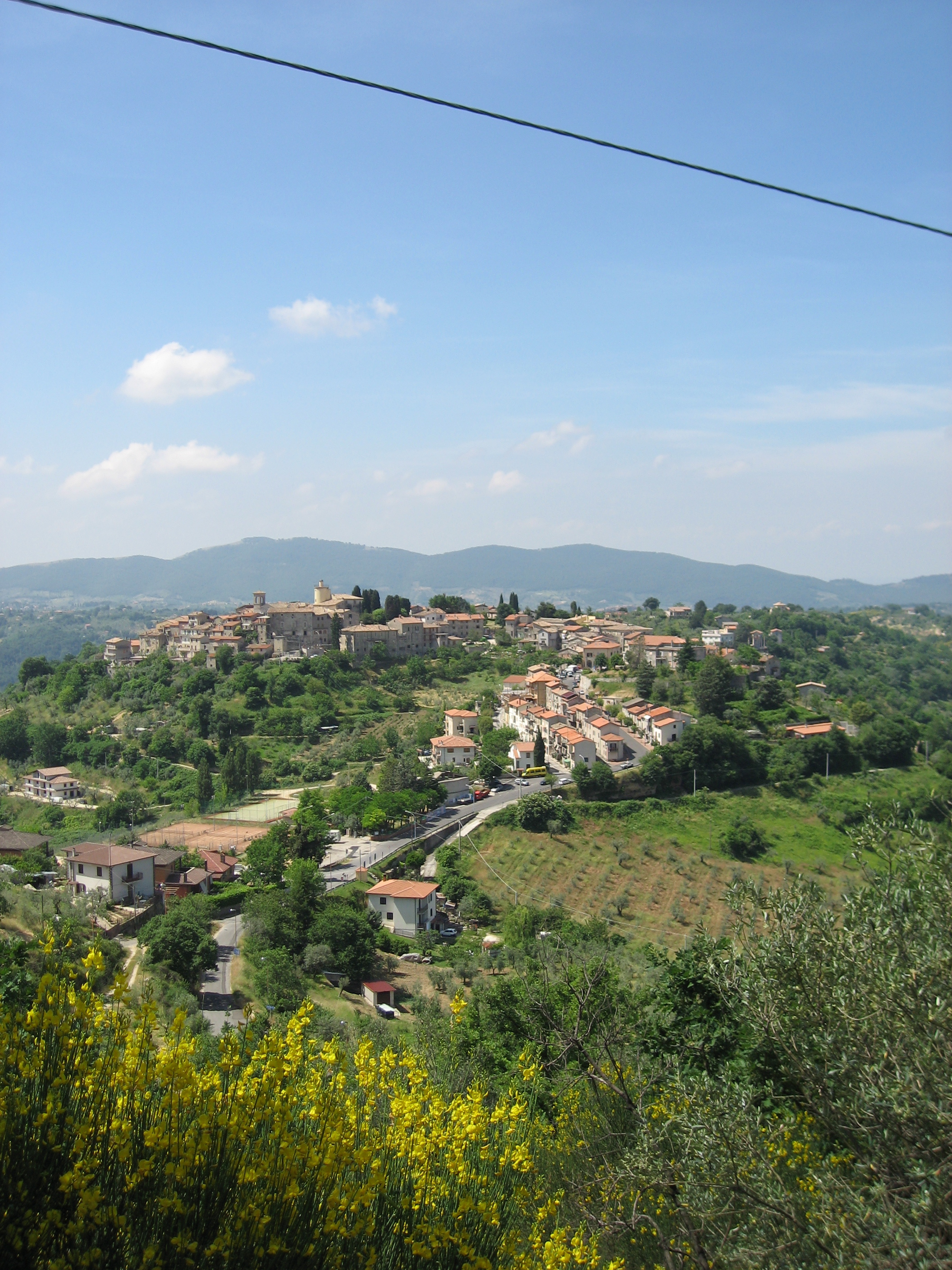
- View of Casaprota

- Coat of arms

- Location within Italy Location within Lazio
- Coordinates: 42°15′N 12°48′E
- Country: Italy
- Region: Lazio
- Province: Rieti (RI)
- Frazioni: Collelungo Sabino

Government
  - Mayor: Marcello Ratini

Area
  - Total: 14.55 km^{2} (5.62 sq mi)
- Elevation: 523 m (1,716 ft)

Population (31 May 2017)
  - Total: 734
  - Density: 50.4/km^{2} (131/sq mi)
- Demonym: Casaprotani
- Time zone: UTC+1 (CET)
  - Summer (DST): UTC+2 (CEST)
- Postal code: 02030
- Dialing code: 0765
- Patron saint: St. Michael Argchangel
- Saint day: September 29
- Website: Official website

Casaprota is a comune (municipality) in the Province of Rieti in the Italian region of Latium, located about 45 kilometres (28 mi) northeast of Rome and about 20 kilometres (12 mi) southwest of Rieti.
