= Morro Reatino =

- Comune
- Comune di Morro Reatino
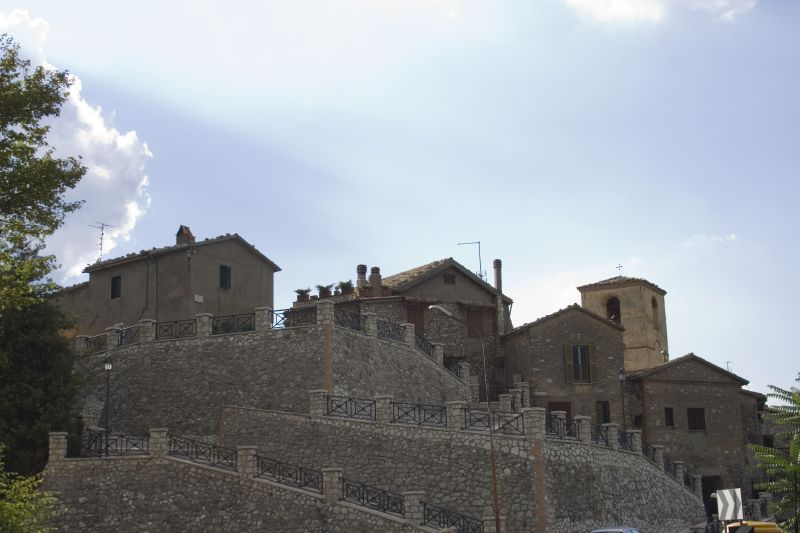
- View of Morro Reatino

- Coat of arms

- Location within Italy Location within Lazio
- Coordinates: 42°32′N 12°50′E
- Country: Italy
- Region: Lazio
- Province: Rieti (RI)

Government
  - Mayor: Gabriele Cintia Lattanzi

Area
  - Total: 15.82 km^{2} (6.11 sq mi)
- Elevation: 745 m (2,444 ft)

Population (30 November 2016)
  - Total: 370
  - Density: 23/km^{2} (61/sq mi)
- Time zone: UTC+1 (CET)
  - Summer (DST): UTC+2 (CEST)
- Postal code: 02010
- Dialing code: 0746
- Website: Official website

Morro Reatino is a comune (municipality) in the Province of Rieti in the Italian region of Lazio, located about 80 kilometres (50 mi) northeast of Rome and about 15 kilometres (9 mi) north of Rieti.

It's famous for being the stage of Coca-Cola's commercial in the 60s "I'd like to buy the world a Coke". The location was chosen by director Harvey Gabor to enhance the message of unity and harmony portrayed in the commercial.
