= Sabino dialect =

Central Italian dialect

Sabino
- Aquilano, Reatino, Cicolano.
- Native to: Italy
- Region: Lazio (provinces of Rieti, Rome), Northern Abruzzo (province of Aquila)
- Language family: Indo-European: Italic; Latino-Faliscan; Latin; Romance; Italo-Western; Italo-Dalmatian; Italo-Romance; Central Italian; Sabino

Language codes
- ISO 639-3: –
- Glottolog: cico1238 Cicolano-Reatino-Aquilano
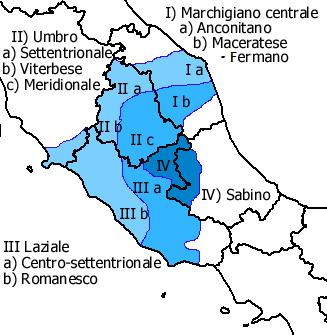

Sabino is a Central Italian dialect spoken in Central Italy, precisely in an area which includes the northern part of the province of Aquila and the whole province of Rieti, with some linguistic islands in the province of Rome. It preserves the Late Latin vocalism, also known as archaic vocalism.

== Subdivisions ==
It is divided into three main groups, each one representing a local form of Sabino.

- Aquilano (also known as Cicolano-Reatino-Aquilano): it is the most important dialect of Sabino and it is considered the standard form. The area where it is spoken covers the largest part of Sabino's zone, in the province of Rieti and in the northern province of Aquila.
- Carseolano or Sublacense, a form of Sabino spoken in province of Rome (Subiaco) and in Carsoli.
- Tagliacozzano, a transitional form of Sabino with Southern Italian which is spoken in Tagliacozzo, Scurcola Marsicana and in upper Liri Valley.

== Common features ==
- Many authors consider Sabino as an independent group of Italian language distinguished from Central Italian. It is the only dialect which keeps the two affixes -o and -u of Late Latin, so there are words like cavajju 'horse', from Latin caballus, and scrio 'I write', from Latin scribo.
- In a large zone between Rieti and Aniene Valley local dialects keeps the Late Latin vocalic system: words in which stressed vowels are e or o the final affix is -o, in words in which stressed vowel are i or u the final affix is -u (riccu 'rich', novu 'new', omo 'man', otto 'eight').
- Apocope of infinitive affixes: magnà(re) 'to eat', occìde(re) 'to kill', dormì(re), 'to sleep'.
- Splitting of -RR- in Rieti district (tera < TERRA, 'soil').

== See also ==
- Central Italian
- Southern Italian
- Languages of Italy
- Sabine language
