= Province of Rieti =

Coordinates: 42°24′30″N 12°51′36″E

Province of Rieti Provincia di Rieti (Italian)
- Province
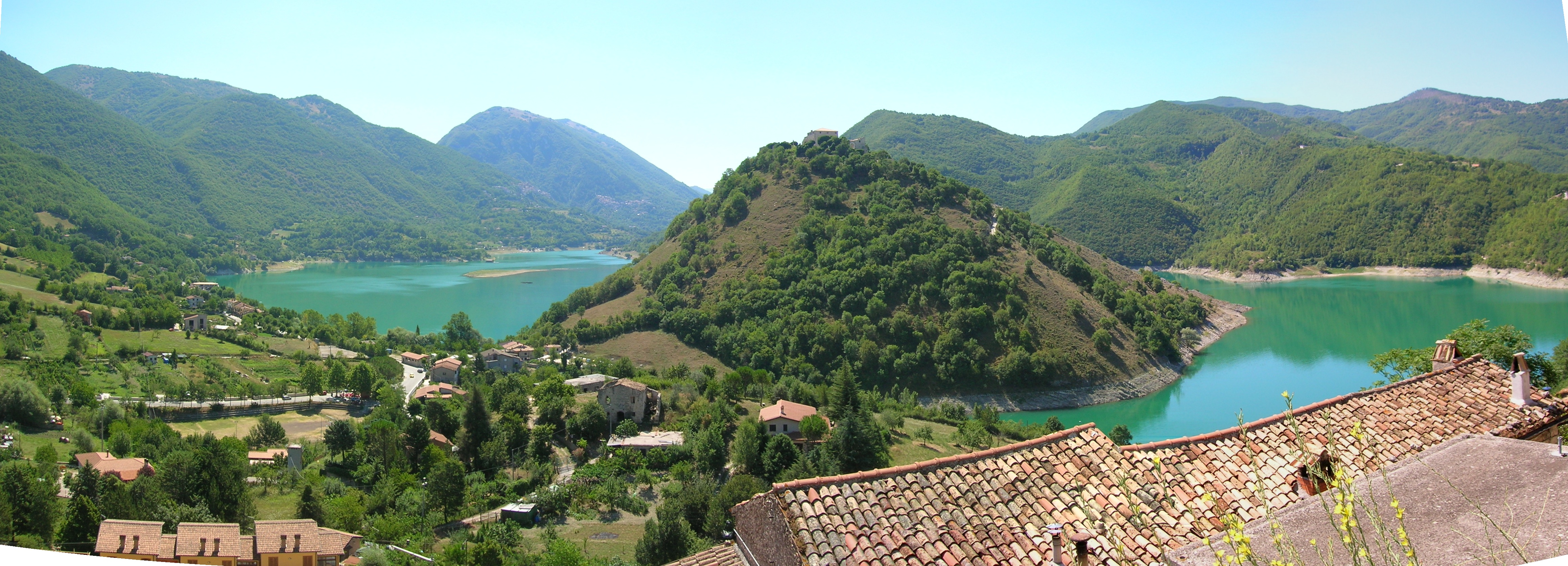
- Castel di Tora

- Flag Coat of arms

- Location of the Province of Rieti in Italy
- Country: Italy
- Region: Lazio
- Capital(s): Rieti
- Municipalities: 73

Government
  - President: Roberta Cuneo (Lega)

Area
  - Total: 2,750.52 km^{2} (1,061.98 sq mi)

Population (2026)
  - Total: 149,335
  - Density: 54.2934/km^{2} (140.619/sq mi)

GDP
  - Total: €2.943 billion (2015)
  - Per capita: €18,542 (2015)
- Time zone: UTC+1 (CET)
  - Summer (DST): UTC+2 (CEST)
- Postal code: 02010-02016, 02018-02026, 02030-02035, 02037-02044, 02046-02048, 02949
- Telephone prefix: 0744, 0746, 0765
- Vehicle registration: RI
- ISTAT code: 57
- Website: www.provincia.rieti.it

The Province of Rieti (Italian: Provincia di Rieti) is a province in the region of Lazio in Italy. Its capital is the city of Rieti. It was established in 1927 from the Province of Perugia.

It has a population of 149,335 in an area of 2,750.52 square kilometres (1,061.98 mi^{2}) across its 73 municipalities.

== Geography ==
A large part of its territory corresponds to the historical-geographical region of Sabina. Rieti is located in the north-east Lazio. It is bordered to the west, along the river Tiber by the province of Viterbo and to the south-west by the Metropolitan City of Rome Capital. It is also bordered by the regions of Umbria to the north and by Marche to the east.

The province is largely mountainous with the Monti della Duchessa and the Monti del Cicolano ranges in the south with Monte Nuria and Monte Giano, the Monti Reatini range with Monte Terminillo (2217 m) in the north in part of the Abruzzese Apennines, and Monti della Laga (2458 m) to the east on the border with Abruzzo. Of particular importance are the two artificial lakes in the Valle del Salto: Lago del Salto and Lago del Turano, both created during the Fascist period. Lago del Salto is the largest in the Lazio region and is situated at an altitude of 1,755 metres (5,758 ft).

There are several protected areas in the province. To the south lies the Parco regionale naturale dei Monti Lucretili, to the southeast the Riserva regionale Montagne della Duchessa, and a small part of the Parco regionale naturale del Sirente - Velino. Between the two areas is the Riserva naturale Monte Navegna e Monte Cervia (between the lakes of Salto and Turano. In the east, in the Monti della Laga range is the Parco Nazionale del Gran Sasso e Monti della Laga. Also of note is the Riserva parziale naturale dei Laghi Lungo e Ripasottile on the Rieti Plain, and the Riserva naturale di Nazzano, Tevere-Farfa to the west. Riserva parziale naturale dei Laghi Lungo e Ripasottile contains the lakes of Lungo and Ripasottile, which support a diversity of wildlife, particularly birds such as herons and little grebes. There are numerous natural oases, castles, fortresses and Franciscan sanctuaries dotted about the province of Rieti.

=== Municipalities ===
The province has 73 municipalities:

- Accumoli
- Amatrice
- Antrodoco
- Ascrea
- Belmonte in Sabina
- Borbona
- Borgo Velino
- Borgorose
- Cantalice
- Cantalupo in Sabina
- Casaprota
- Casperia
- Castel di Tora
- Castel Sant'Angelo
- Castelnuovo di Farfa
- Cittaducale
- Cittareale
- Collalto Sabino
- Colle di Tora
- Collegiove
- Collevecchio
- Colli sul Velino
- Concerviano
- Configni
- Contigliano
- Cottanello
- Fara in Sabina
- Fiamignano
- Forano
- Frasso Sabino
- Greccio
- Labro
- Leonessa
- Longone Sabino
- Magliano Sabina
- Marcetelli
- Micigliano
- Mompeo
- Montasola
- Monte San Giovanni in Sabina
- Montebuono
- Monteleone Sabino
- Montenero Sabino
- Montopoli di Sabina
- Morro Reatino
- Nespolo
- Orvinio
- Paganico Sabino
- Pescorocchiano
- Petrella Salto
- Poggio Bustone
- Poggio Catino
- Poggio Mirteto
- Poggio Moiano
- Poggio Nativo
- Poggio San Lorenzo
- Posta
- Pozzaglia Sabina
- Rieti
- Rivodutri
- Rocca Sinibalda
- Roccantica
- Salisano
- Scandriglia
- Selci
- Stimigliano
- Tarano
- Toffia
- Torri in Sabina
- Torricella in Sabina
- Turania
- Vacone
- Varco Sabino

== Demographics ==
As of 2026, the population is 149,335, of which 50.1% are male, and 49.9% are female. Minors make up 12.7% of the population, and seniors make up 28.0%.

Historical population

Year	Pop.	±%
1861	133,539	—
1871	140,903	+5.5%
1881	146,719	+4.1%
1901	165,566	+12.8%
1911	170,654	+3.1%
1921	175,023	+2.6%
1931	173,684	−0.8%
1936	174,961	+0.7%

Year	Pop.	±%
1951	179,157	+2.4%
1961	162,405	−9.4%
1971	143,162	−11.8%
1981	142,794	−0.3%
1991	144,942	+1.5%
2001	147,410	+1.7%
2011	155,164	+5.3%
2021	151,143	−2.6%

Source: ISTAT

=== Immigration ===
As of 2025, immigrants make up 12.0% of the population. The 5 largest foreign countries of birth are Romania, Albania, Ukraine, Argentina, and Pakistan.

== See also ==
- Sabina (region)
- Lake della Duchessa
