= Rieti Valley =

Landform in central Italy

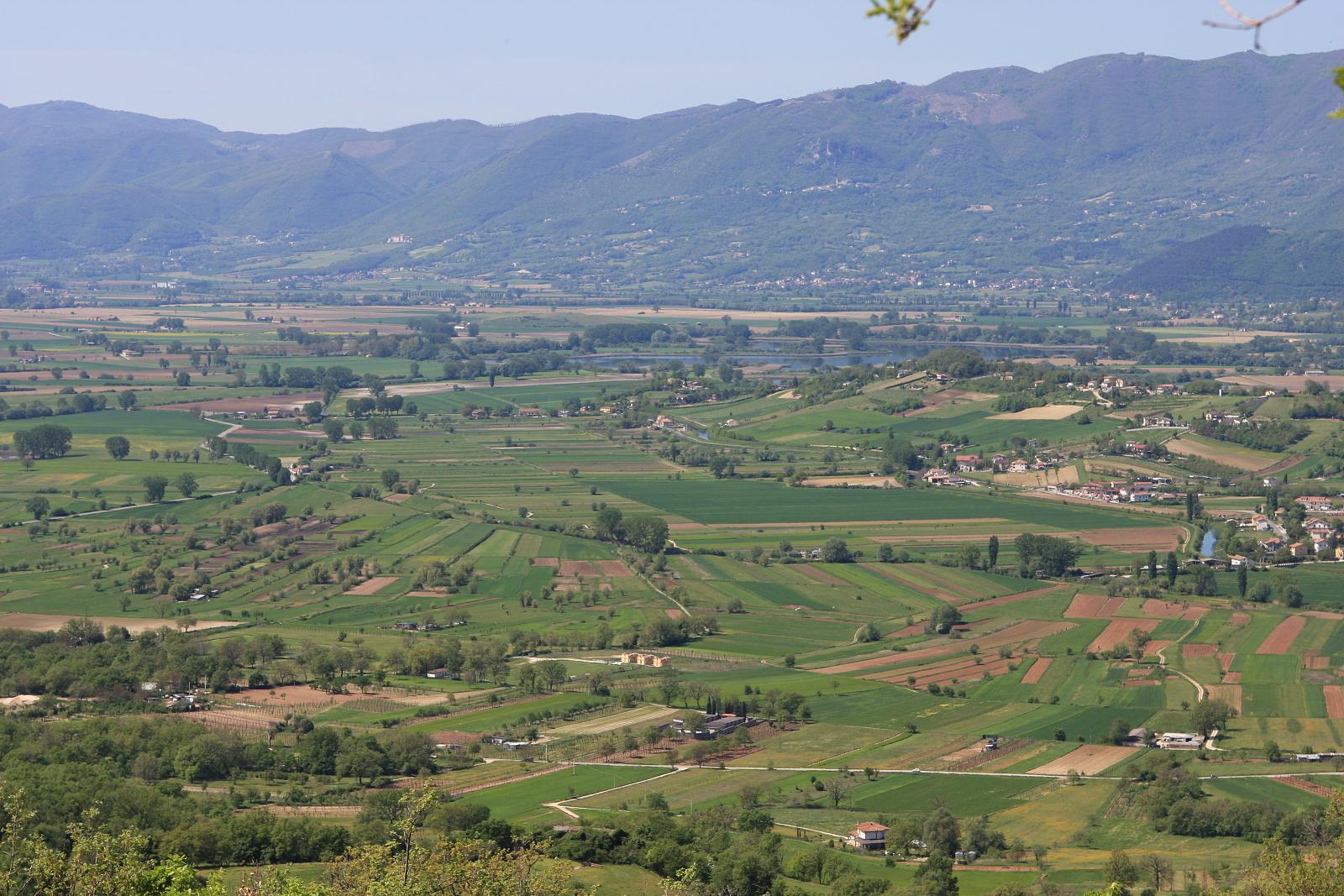
The Rieti Valley and Ripasottile Lake as seen from Poggio Bustone, looking West. In the background, Monti Sabini bordering the valley.

The Rieti Valley or Rieti Plain (Italian: Piana Reatina or Conca Reatina) is a small plain in central Italy, where lies the city of Rieti, Lazio. It is also known as Sacred Valley and Holy Valley (Italian: Valle Santa) since saint Francis of Assisi lived here for many years and erected four shrines, which have become the destination of pilgrims.

It is the center of the Sabine region and an important part of the province of Rieti. Originated from the draining of the ancient Lake Velino, it is crossed by the Velino river and bordered by Monti Reatini and Monti Sabini.

== Origin ==
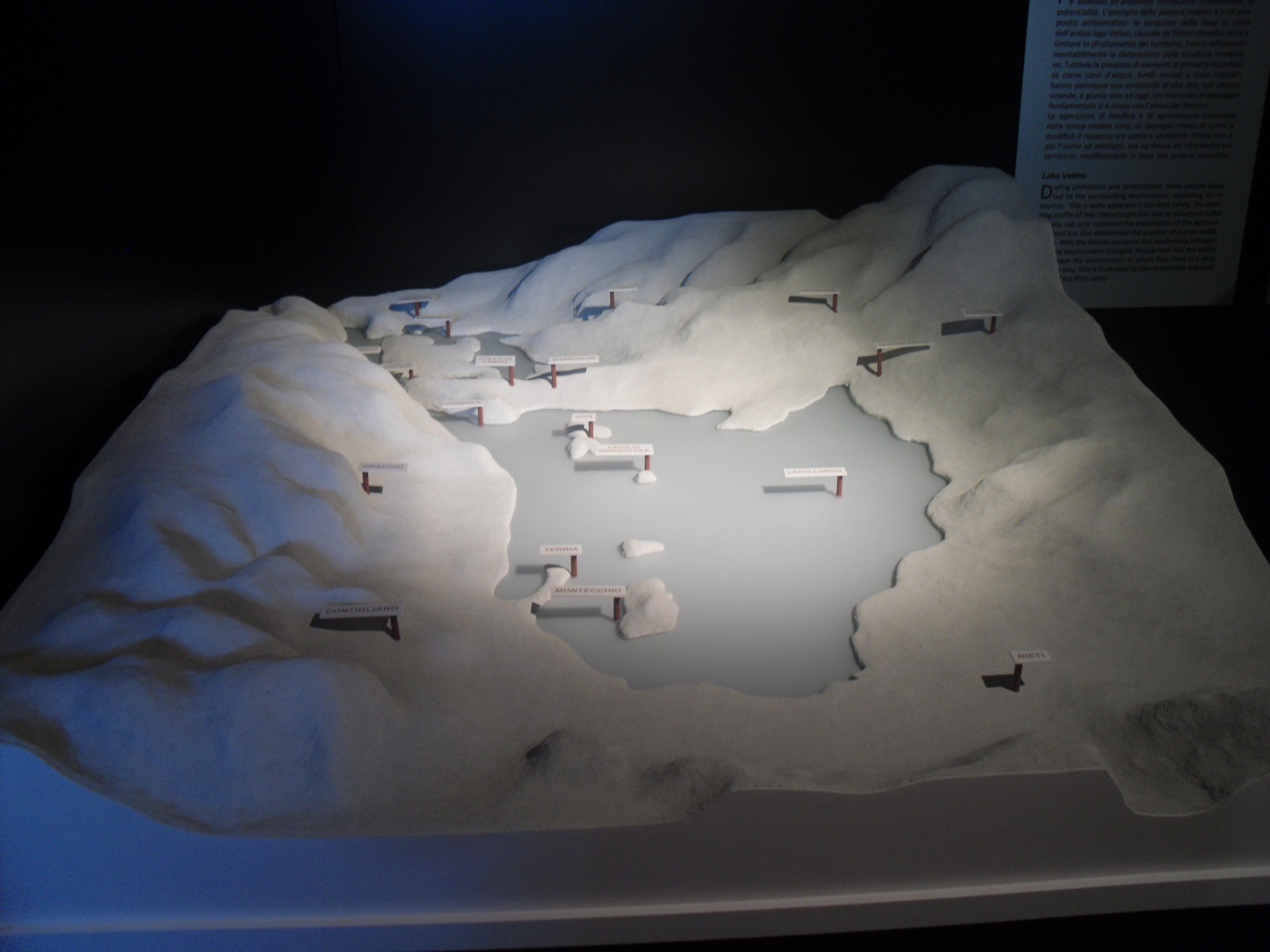
Plastic model on display at the Civic Museum of Rieti, showing the extent of ancient Velino Lake

In prehistory, the Rieti Valley was entirely occupied by a large lake which ancient Romans called Lake Velinus, since its tributary was the Velino river. The lake was formed during the quaternary, when limestone carried by water in the river deposited in the tight canyon where it flowed, shortly before joining the Nera river, near the present-day village of Marmore. As a result, the riverbed was occluded and the Rieti Plain was flooded becoming a lake. The water level in the lake rose and lowered several times during the centuries, favouring the formation of wide marshy zones around the lake where it was unhealthy to live because of malaria.

For this reason, in 271 BC (after Rome had defeated the Sabines and acquired control of the area), consul Manius Curius Dentatus decided to drain the lake by digging an artificial canal in the limestone rock at Marmore. This imposing engineering achievement created the Cascata delle Marmore, a 165-metre (541 ft) tall waterfall which allowed the Velino river to flow into the Nera river, and create a large and fertile valley to be farmed. Of the original great lake only some minor lakes remain, the largest being Lago di Piediluco.

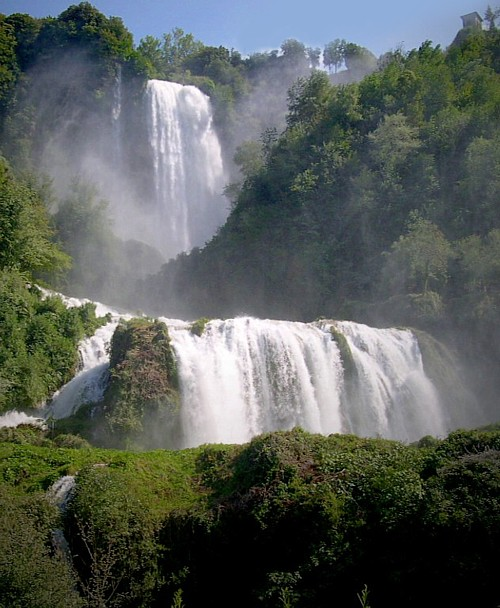
Cascata delle Marmore

After the fall of the Roman Empire, lack of maintenance caused the canal to become obstructed again and in the Middle Ages the lake partially reformed.

New draining interventions were ordered in 1545 by Pope Paul III; Antonio da Sangallo the Younger was charged to dig a new canal, but died of malaria in 1546 before the works were completed. Only in 1596 pope Clement VIII ordered new interventions, and Giovanni Fontana completed the new canal, ultimately draining the valley.

Even after the lake was drained, recurring floods of the Velino river still caused problems for farmers, damaging their fields. This problem was solved in the Fascist era, when two large dams were built along the course of the two main tributaries of Velino (rivers Salto and Turano) to control their flow. As a result, the large artificial lakes Salto and Turano were formed (around 20 km southeast from the Rieti plain).

== Geography ==
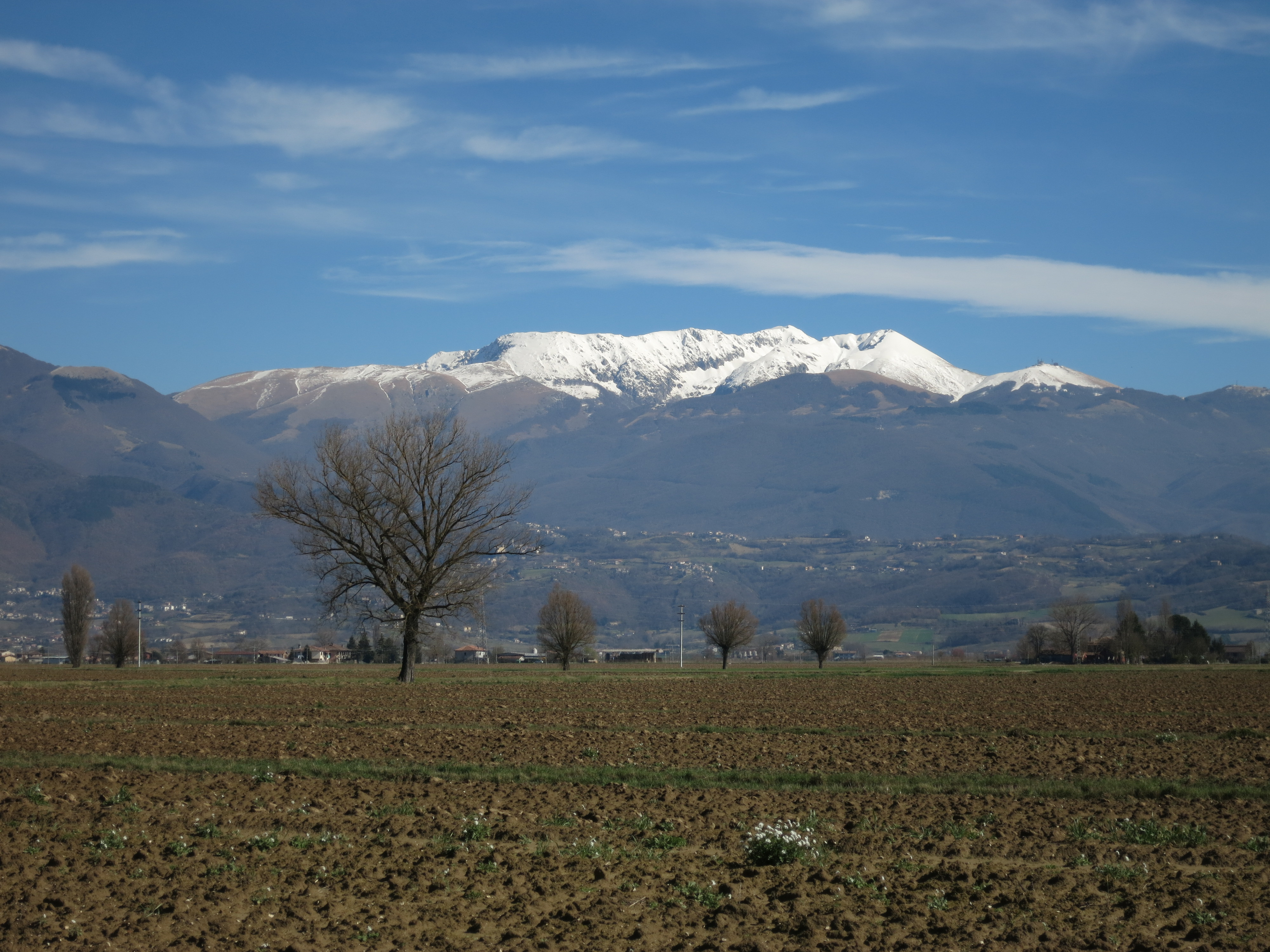
Monte Terminillo as seen from the valley

The Rieti Plain has a semi-circular shape and covers around 90 km^{2} (35 sq mi), ranging from 370 to 380 metres above sea level; it is 14 km long and averages 7 km in width. It is bordered all round by mountains: Monti Sabini to the west and south and Monti Reatini to the east (the highest peak being Monte Terminillo, a popular skiing resort, 2,217 metres (7,274 ft) high).

On the plain two minor lakes can be found, the remains of the ancient Lake Velinus: Lago Lungo and Lago di Ripasottile. These small wetlands have preserved similar conditions to those present before the draining of the valley, and are a resting area for many migrating bird species; for this reason the area is now a nature reserve.

== Agriculture ==
The Rieti Valley has always been known for its fertility, and was sometimes nicknamed "the granary of Rome". Virgil wrote that, if a stick was planted in a field, it could not be seen anymore on the day after, due to the grass that had grown around it.

In the 19th century, wheat native to the Rieti Valley was famous all over Italy for being very productive and disease-resistant; agronomist Nazareno Strampelli used it as a starting point for his experiments, which led to the creation of wheat varieties that became popular all over the world in the mid-20th century.

Other crops in the past included woad and sugar beet (which was refined at the Rieti sugar mill). Today the most important crops are corn, sunflowers and vegetables.

== Tourism and pilgrimages ==
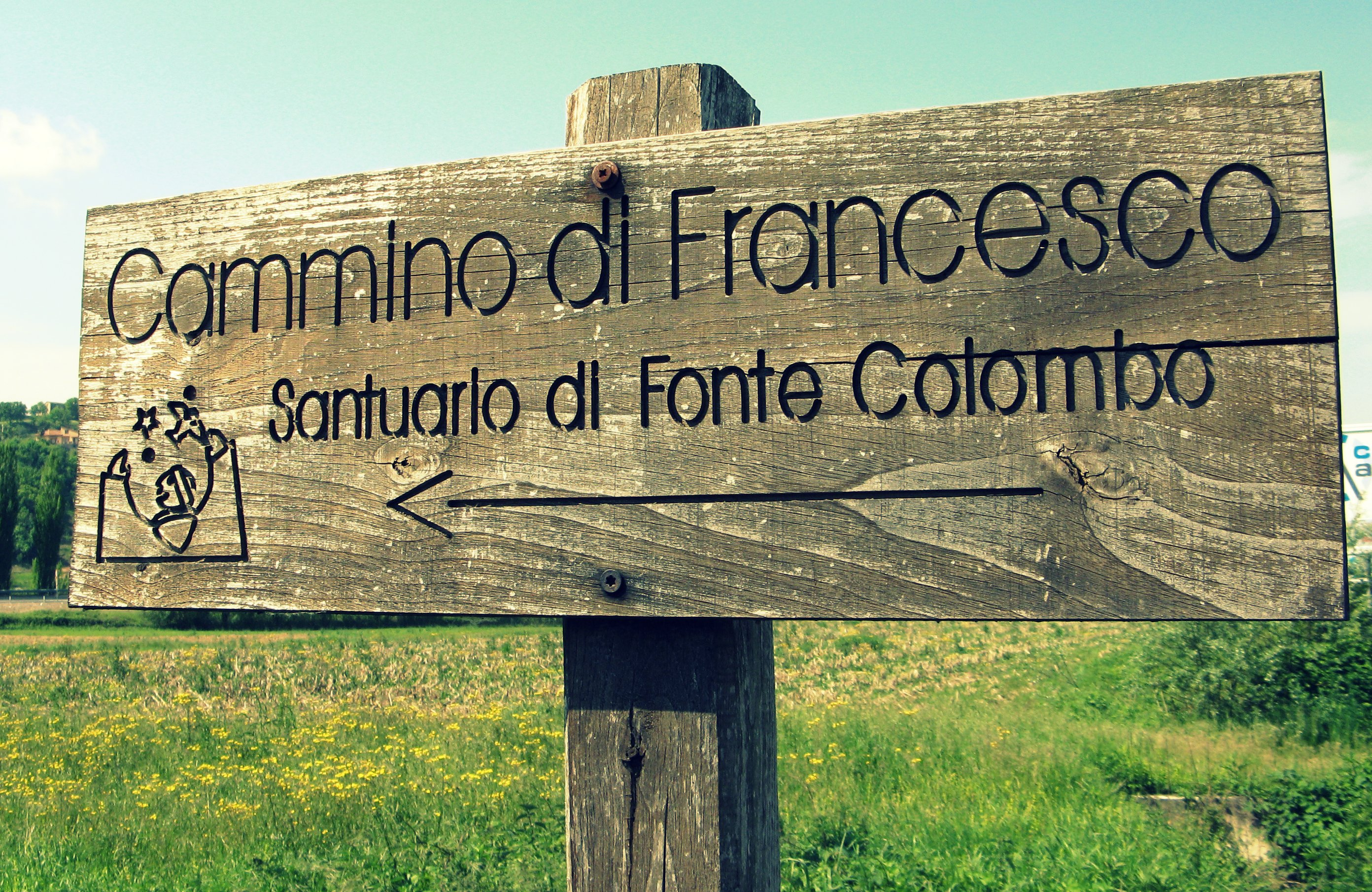
Cammino di Francesco sign

In the course of his life, saint Francis of Assisi visited repeatedly the Rieti Valley: the first time probably in 1209, then a long stay in 1223 and then another from the autumn of 1225 to April 1226. While in the valley Francis presented the first living nativity scene, wrote the final version of the Franciscan Rule, probably also the Canticle of the Sun, and founded four shrines that are located at the four borders of the plain: Sanctuary of Greccio, La Foresta, Poggio Bustone and Fonte Colombo.

The stay of Saint Francis coincided with a period in which Rieti enjoyed economic prosperity and became often a papal seat, from Innocent III in 1198 to Boniface VIII in 1298.

Today, the Franciscan sanctuaries have become objects of pilgrimage; tourists and pilgrims walk a path known as the Cammino di Francesco, which links the shrines and other landmarks such as Rieti's mediaeval city centre, the Abbey of Saint Pastor and the Lungo and Ripasottile Lakes natural reserve.
