= Monte Giano =

Mountain in Lazio, Italy

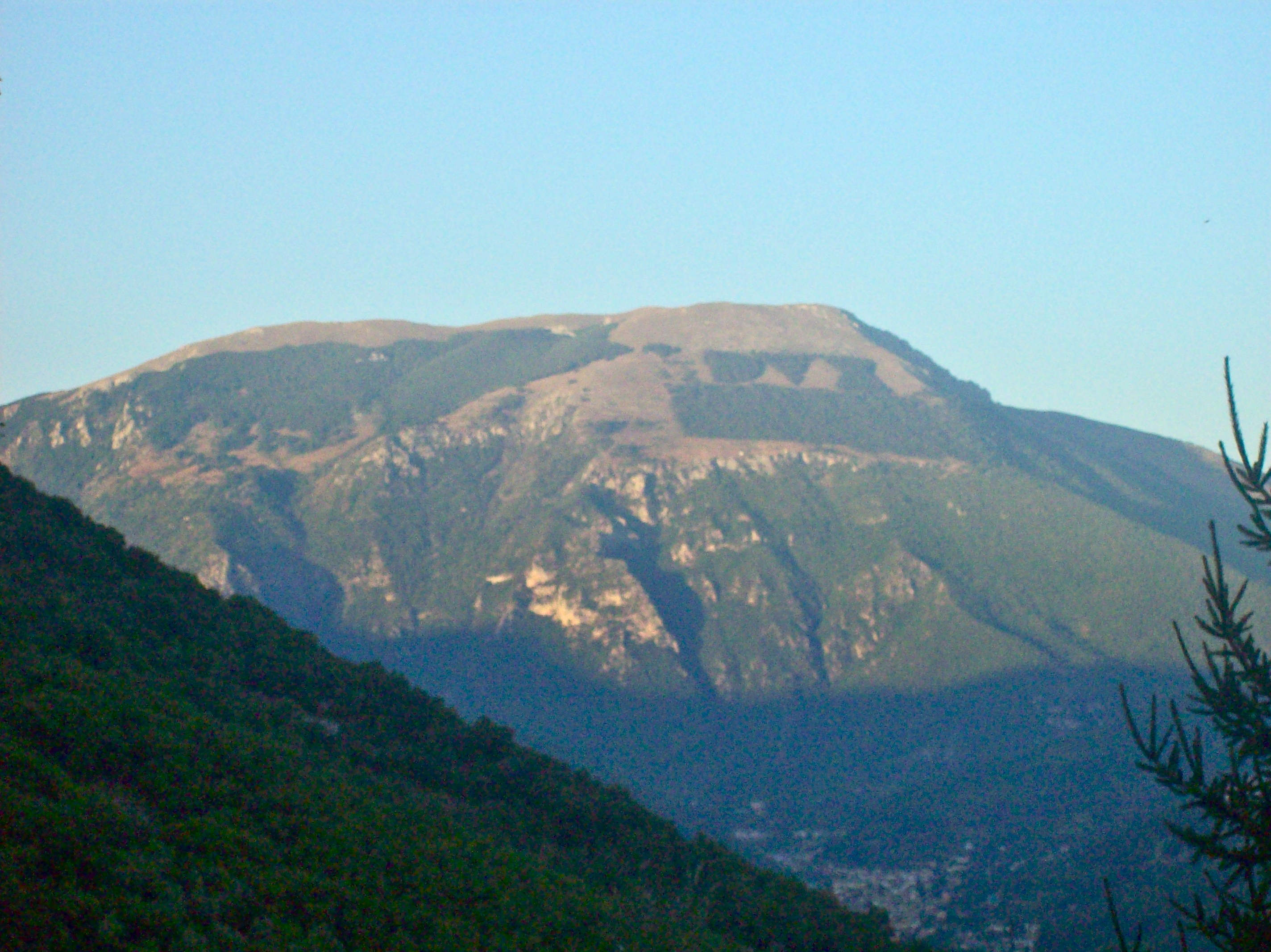
- Monte Giano seen from the San Vittorino Plain near Cittaducale

Highest point
- Elevation: 1,820.3 m (5,972 ft)
- Prominence: 460 m (1,510 ft)
- Coordinates: 42°15′20″N 13°03′49″E

Geography
- Location within Italy
- Country: Italy
- Province: Rieti
- Region: Lazio
- Parent range: Apennine Mountains

Mount Giano (formerly known as Mount Cotischio) is a mountain in the central Abruzzo Apennines, 1,820 m above sea level. Located on the border between Lazio and Abruzzo, along the Apennine watershed, it belongs to the Cicolano Mountains subgroup.

== Description ==
It is located in the province of Rieti northeast of Antrodoco and dominates, with a prominence of about 1,300 m, the lower part of the Velino Gorge that separates it from the Terminillo massif to the west, with the Monte Nuria mountain range to the south and the Monte Calvo mountain range to the east representing its natural geomorphological continuation; to the north it connects directly to the Monti Reatini, while to the northeast it faces the Cascina Plain and the Mountains of Alto Aterno.

The main peak reaches 1,820 meters, but there are other peaks, including Croce di Monte Giano (1,779.3 m) that exceed 1,700 meters. Between these is the Monte Giano Meadows plateau.

On the slopes of the mountain there are the typical species of the Maquis shrubland: downy oaks, oaks, maples, which reach up to 1,200/1,300 m. Beyond 1,300 meters, beech trees begin to be found, which on the western slope reach up to about 1,700 meters.

At the southern end of Mt. Giano, in the narrow space between it and the adjacent Mt. Serrone (1,044 m), are the Antrodoco gorges (a narrow, wild incision in the rock, about 1.5 km long), which are an obligatory point of passage for communications between Rieti and L'Aquila. For this reason, the state highway 17 and the Terni-L'Aquila railway climb Mount Giano, which can thus reach the Sella di Corno pass from the Velino valley.

Because of their strategic location, and the ease with which they allowed ambushes to be set, the Antrodoco Gorges have been the scene of several military events over the centuries: among them, the defeat of the French army in 1799 and the battle of Antrodoco in 1821.

=== The "DUX pine forest" ===
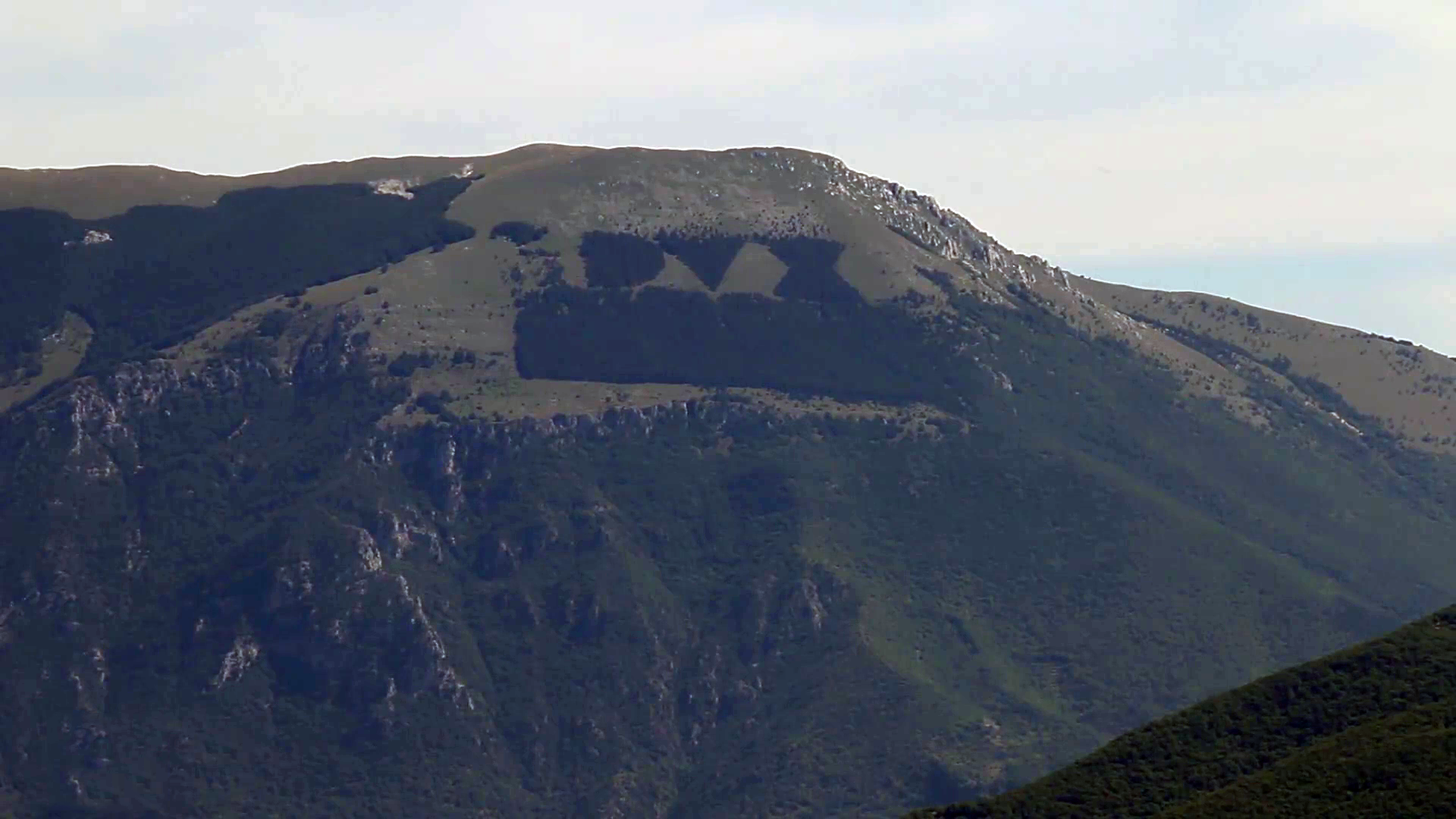
The DUX pine forest

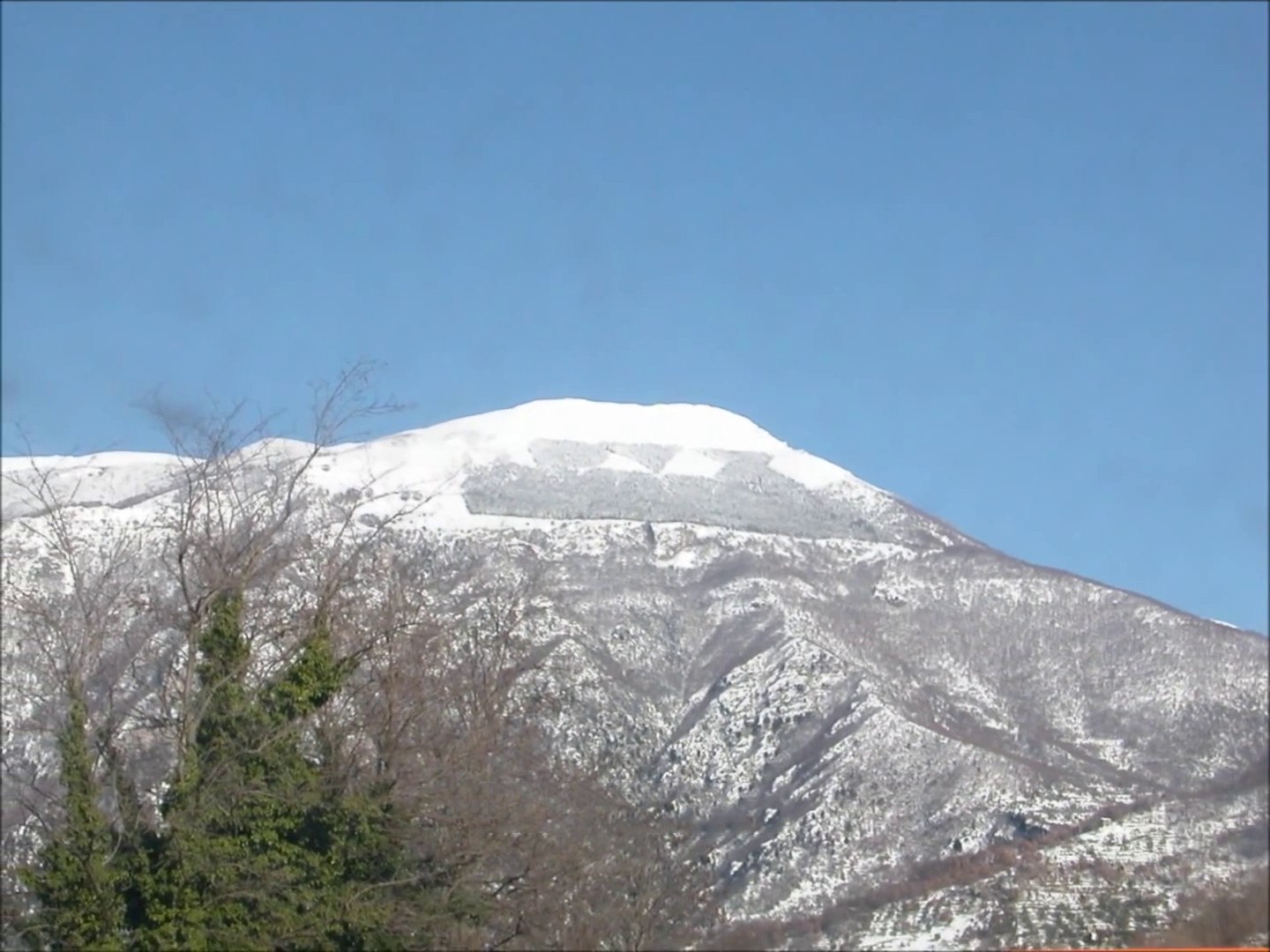
Snow-capped Mount Giano

The mountain owes some notoriety to the presence, on its western slope, of a pine forest that forms the inscription "DVX" (duce, from the Latin dux, ducis). The inscription overlooks the Velino valley and is visible from several kilometers away, approaching Antrodoco on the Via Salaria; on days with little mist, especially when the mountain is snow-covered, the inscription is visible even from the city of Rome.

The pine forest covers about eight hectares and is composed of about 20,000 pine trees; it was intended to defend the town of Antrodoco from landslides caused by heavy winter rains, which had repeatedly caused death and devastation, and was a tribute to Benito Mussolini. It was built in 1939 (during the Fascist period) by Cittaducale's Forest Guard Cadet School, with the contribution of many local youths, through the reforestation of an originally desolate limestone coastline.

From the post-war period onward, the erasure of the inscription has been repeatedly called for, although it has been opposed by those who consider it an integral part of the town's landscape and history, as well as by those nostalgic for the 20-year period. In the 1950s new reforestation was carried out, whereby the rectangle below the word DUX was created, so as to make the inscription less obvious. Abandonment of the forest over the years gradually made the inscription less recognizable.

Due to new landslides and rock falls, in 1995 the Lazio region (Badaloni junta) approved work to restore the pine forest, financed in 1998 and carried out in the summer of 2004. On August 24, 2017, the pine forest was severely damaged by a fire. It may have been accidental or deliberate. In February 2018, a group of CasaPound volunteers proceeded to plant 1,000 pine trees on Mt. Giano in order to restore the inscription. The operation was deemed unnecessary by members of the local community due to the wrong timing.

== See also ==
- Monti Reatini

== Bibliography ==
- Carta CAI - Gruppi di Monte Calvo-Monte Giano-Monte Nuria e Monti dell'Alto Aterno - Camera di Commercio dell'Aquila.
