= Monti Sabini =

Mountain range in Italy

Coordinates: 42°13′N 12°50′E

Sabini Mountains
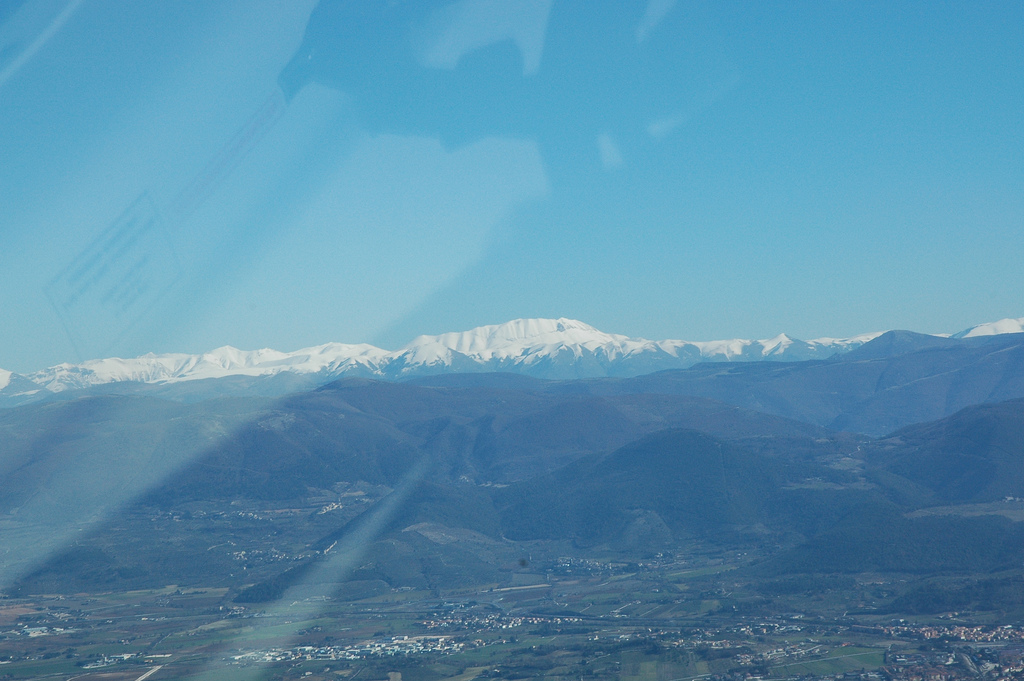
- Location of the range in Italy

Highest point
- Peak: Monte Tancia
- Elevation: 1,282 m (4,206 ft)

Naming
- Etymology: Ancient civilization name
- Native name: Monti Sabini (Italian)

Geography
- Country: Italy
- Region: Lazio
- Districts: Rome and Rieti
- Parent range: Apennine Mountains
- Borders on: Rivers of: Tiber, Nera, Velino, Turano, and Aniene

The Monti Sabini is a mountain range in the Apennines of Latium, central Italy.

It is located in a north-south direction between the Monti Reatini at the east and the Tiber valley at the west. The upper section is the Monti Sabini proper, on the boundary between Latium and Umbria, and the Monti Lucretili sub-range, on the boundary between the province of Rieta and the Metropolitan City of Rome. The two sub-ranges are separated by the plain and hilly areas of the Sabina. The highest peak of the range is Monte Tancia, at 1,282 m (4,206 ft).
