= Sanctuary della Foresta, Rieti =

Italian sanctuary-monastery

Coordinates: 42°26′12″N 12°52′28″E

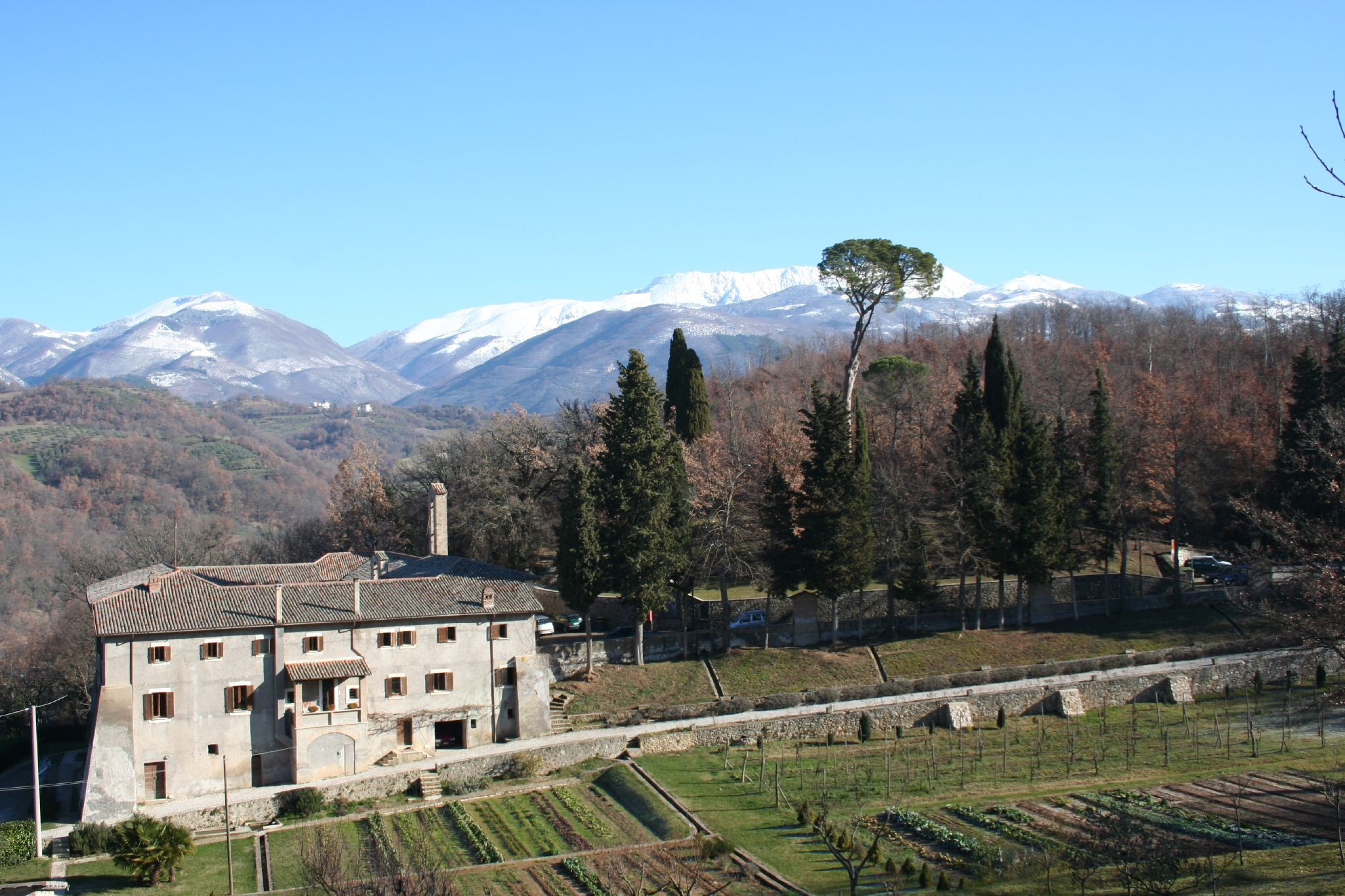
Sanctuary della Foresta

The Sanctuary of Santa Maria della Foresta, abbreviated as the Santuario della Foresta is one of a local cluster of four sanctuary-monasteries, originally based on rural oratories founded in the Rieti Valley by Francis of Assisi in the areas near Rieti, Lazio, Italy. This sanctuary is located about 3.5 km from Rieti, and near the town of Castelfranco.

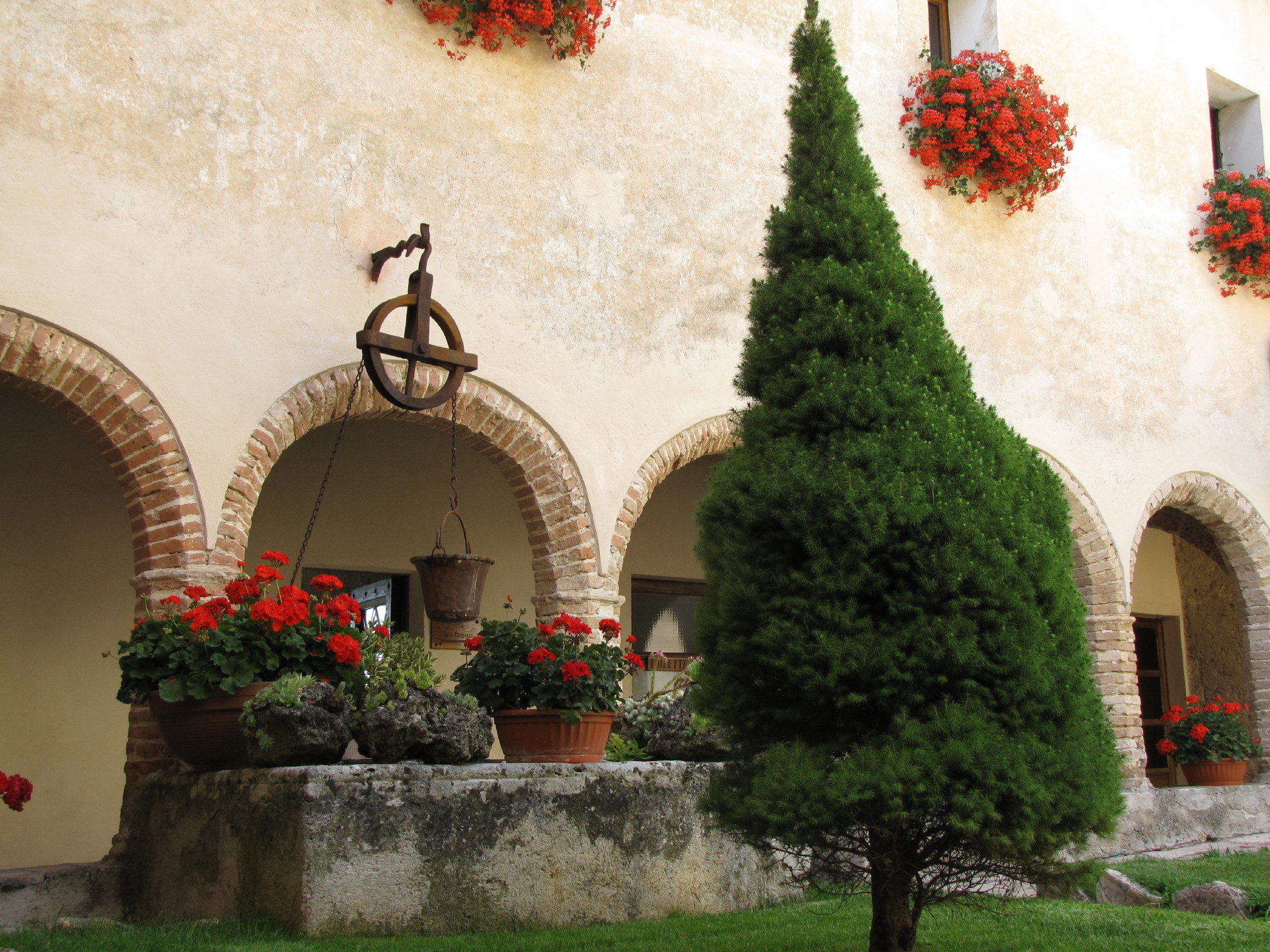
Cloister

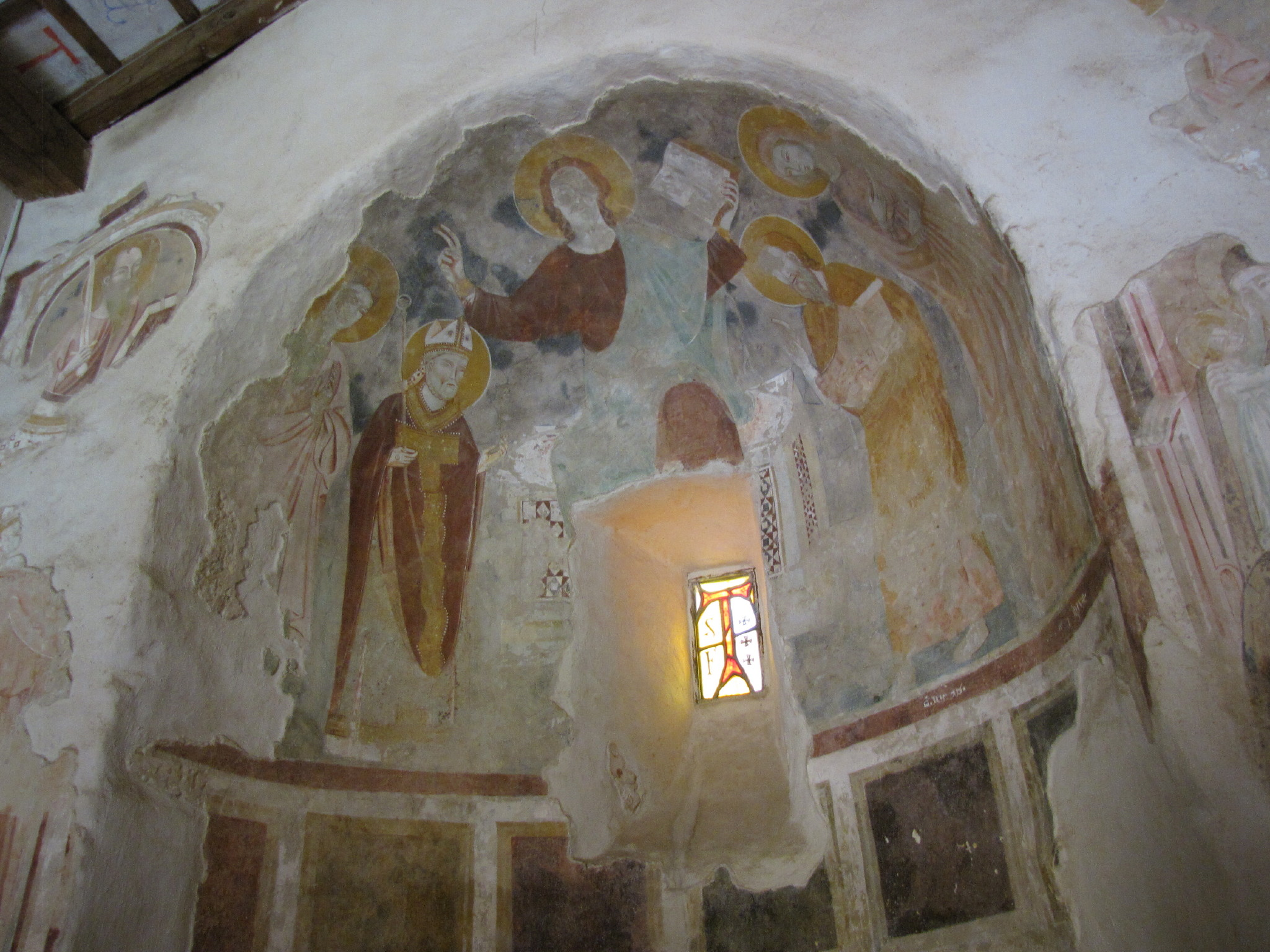
Apse frescoes

== History ==
Originally, the site had a rural chapel or church dedicated to St Fabian. In 1225, Francis was invited to Rieti by Cardinal Ugolino, later Pope Gregory IX, putatively for the future Saint to have his vision tended to by a medical doctor. Arriving in the region, he preferred, as was his custom to reside in a rural spot, continuing his preaching from this site. Legend holds that while Francis was present, he was able to convert a miserly harvest of grapes into a plentiful amount of wine.

After Francis's stay the site housed some eremitic female followers. In 1346, the bishop of Rieti expelled the women and granted the church and adjacent house to the friars of the Clareni congregation of fraticelli, following the guidance of Pietro Guido da Fossombrone, also known as Angelo da Clareno. The remained here until 1568, when this order was incorporated into the Frati Minori. In 1648, the convent was officially granted to this order. Refurbishment defaced some of the prior decoration. The convent still is occupied by the Franciscan order.
