= Sabena Flight 503 =

1955 aviation accident

Coordinates: 42.4666°N 12.9833°E

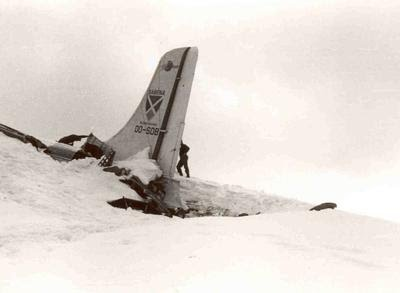
- Scraps of Douglas DC-6

Accident
- Date: 13 February 1955
- Summary: Controlled flight into terrain due to harsh weather conditions and faulty navigation
- Site: Monte Terminillo, Rieti, Italy

Aircraft
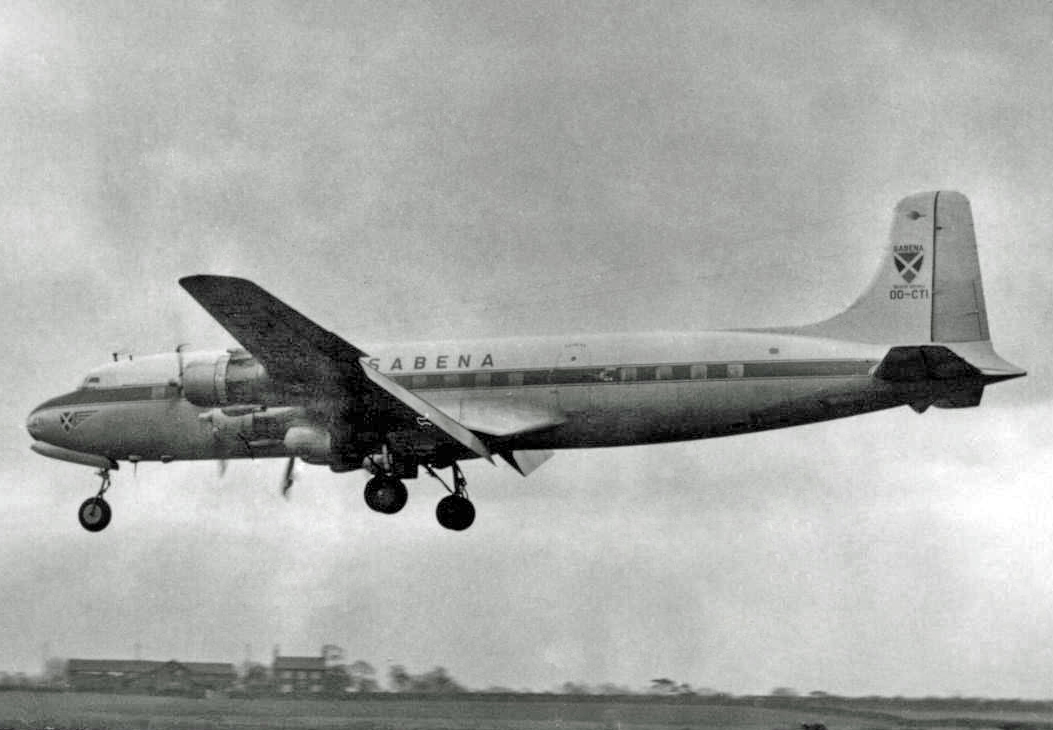
- A Sabena Douglas DC-6B, similar to the accident aircraft
- Aircraft type: Douglas DC-6B
- Operator: Sabena
- Registration: OO-SDB
- Flight origin: Melsbroek, Belgium
- Destination: Leopoldstad, Congo
- Passengers: 21
- Crew: 8
- Fatalities: 29
- Injuries: 0
- Survivors: 0

The crash of Sabena Flight 503 was an accident involving a Douglas DC-6 of the Belgian airline company Sabena which crashed into Monte Terminillo near Rieti, Italy, 100 km northeast of Rome on 13 February 1955, killing all 29 people on board.

== Aircraft ==
The Douglas DC-6 involved was built in 1947 with serial number 43063/60 and registration OO-SDB and was used by the Belgian airline company Sabena until its destruction in 1955.

== Crash ==
Sabena Flight 503 was a Douglas DC-6 which departed from Brussels, Belgium at 17:17 GMT en route to Leopoldstad, Congo with stops at Rome-Ciampino, Italy and Kano, Nigeria under the command of pilot Stephan Stolz and co-pilot Patrick McNamara.

It's raining hard, but I think...

— Last words from Captain Stolz heard by Ciampino International Airport, 13 February 1955.

The aircraft made contact with Ciampino International Airport according to plan at 19:29 GMT, at which time the aircraft had passed over Florence, Italy at 5,300 metres (17,500 ft). The weather conditions however kept getting worse with heavy rain and snow fall. At 19:48 Ciampino control asked the aircraft whether it had passed over Viterbo. Instead of answering this question directly, the crew inquired whether the Viterbo NDB (Non-directional beacon) was on full power. The controller replied that another aircraft had overflown Viterbo shortly before and had found it to be operating properly. At 19:51 GMT the aircraft stated that it had passed over Viterbo one minute previously and requested clearance to descend to 1,700 metres (5,500 ft) which was granted. One minute later it inquired whether the Ciampino ILS was operating and received an affirmative reply. At 19:55 co-pilot McNamara contacted Ciampino and stated that the crew would prepare for the landing procedure but that the visibility had worsened; the connection was very weak due to the severe storm and heavy snow and rain fall. At 19:56 Flight 503 called Rome control for the last time when suddenly the communication was cut off.

The aircraft had crashed somewhere in the mountains of Rieti, Italy 100 km (54 nmi; 62 mi) northeast of Rome and was now missing. Sabena itself got notified about the missing aircraft that same night at 23:15 but would not make an official statement until the morning of the following day.

=== Rescue effort ===
The airplane had crashed somewhere in the mountains of Rieti, Italy 100 km (62 mi) northeast of Rome which were known for being difficult to access and also lay in a nature reserve where wolves roamed. The Italians immediately started a search and rescue mission to locate the missing aircraft and rescue its occupants. They knew the harsh conditions in the mountains and if there were any survivors that they wouldn't last long on top of the freezing mountain. However, because the weather didn't clear, the searchers could only investigate the lower parts of the mountains.

Two days after the disaster, Belgian investigators arrived in Rieti and helped their Italian colleagues to locate the crash site. On 16 February the weather finally cleared and helicopters could be used in the search, but nothing was found. In a last effort to locate the aircraft in time for anyone to survive, experts calculated how much fuel the aircraft had left and extrapolated the distance it could have traveled. Their calculations stated that the aircraft should be in a 100 km (62 mi) range from Ciampino. Finally after an 8-day search on 21 February 1955 at 10:15, the aircraft was located on Monte Terminillo at a site so remote it could only be reached the next day on 22 February after the rescue teams walked and climbed the mountain for over 2 hours.

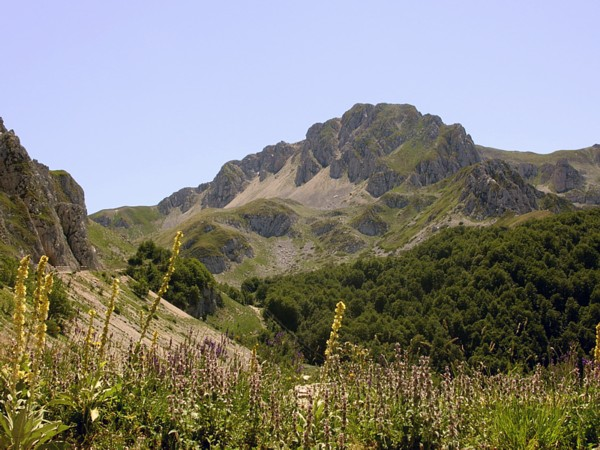
Monte Terminillo seen from the East

When they finally reached the crash site, there was devastation. It was freezing −11 °C (12 °F) and visibility was only 15 to 20 m (49 to 66 ft), sometimes even less. The snow lay 1 m (3 ft 3 in) thick and hid part of the aircraft. The aircraft lay in big pieces in the snow and looked as if it had crashed nose down after hitting a number of trees on the mountain side. Only the tail of the aircraft aft of the rear door was relatively intact. The engines had been torn off and only 2 of the 4 were ever found, one of them had clearly hit the trees because there were tree branches stuck in it. The forward section of the fuselage was shredded and the wings were completely destroyed as well, torn main-wheel covers indicated that the landing gear was extended when the aircraft hit the trees and seconds later the mountain.

The first bodies were found shortly after, completely frozen. One of the victims even had a four of diamonds card in his hand. The rest of the bodies were found in or near the aircraft and it became clear that there were no survivors. It however became clear after autopsies and other evidence that everyone had died on impact. All bodies were recovered by 25 February 1955 and transported to a temporary morgue in the church of San Antonio in Rieti.

== Investigation ==
After determining the angle of impact with the mountain, it was discovered that Flight 503 was 150° off course. After investigators calculated the flight path, the final moments of Flight 503 could be reconstructed from the moment it passed Viterbo. A number of watches found stopped at the crash site together with the radio messages and the speed of the aircraft, allowed investigators to construct a clear image of Flight 503's flight path.

It shows that the pilots kept following their flight schedules and kept flying in a straight line. However the crew never noticed that the bad weather and the wind that was blowing from the west had blown the aircraft off course and towards the mountain range. On certain points in the Italian mountains the wind can be so strong that the aircraft was blown on a different course and that the radio-navigation tools on the medium wave couldn't offer the usual assistance which also explained the weak radio signals. In the end, the severe storm together with faulty navigation and a crew which were unfamiliar with the terrain proved to be fatal and send Flight 503 on a direct collision course with the mountain range without anyone realising it.

== Aftermath ==
Marcella Mariani was one of the victims

Most of the aircraft was left on the mountain since constant changing weather cycles made it nearly impossible to retrieve the debris, most of it has now been washed away into deeper parts of the mountain range.

28 of the 29 bodies were taken back to Belgium for burial. Amongst the victims was Miss Italia Marcella Mariani who was buried in Rome, Italy, her intended destination. Family of the victims placed a cross supported by rocks in 1964 on the crash site in remembrance of those lost on that stormy night in 1955. A new monument depicting the intact tail section was unveiled on the crash site in 2010.
