= Santa Chiara, Antrodoco =

Church in Antrodoco, Italy

Coordinates: 42°25′01.5″N 13°04′42.1″E

Santa Chiara is a baroque-style, Roman Catholic church located between corso Roma and Via Savelli, in the town of Antrodoco, province of Rieti, region of Lazio, central Italy. The church was once part of a Clarissan cloistered monastery, which included a hospital.

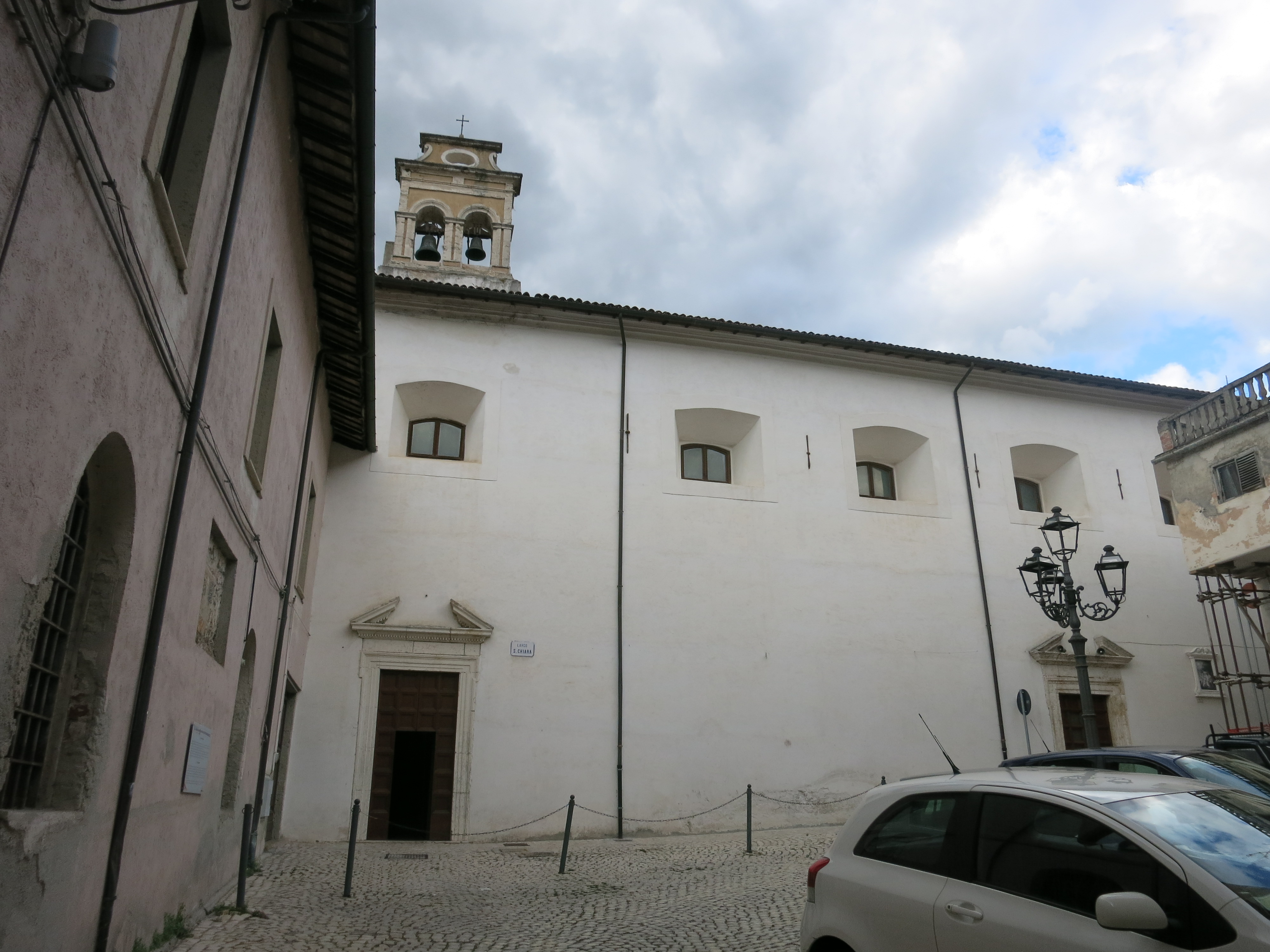
Exterior view with portals

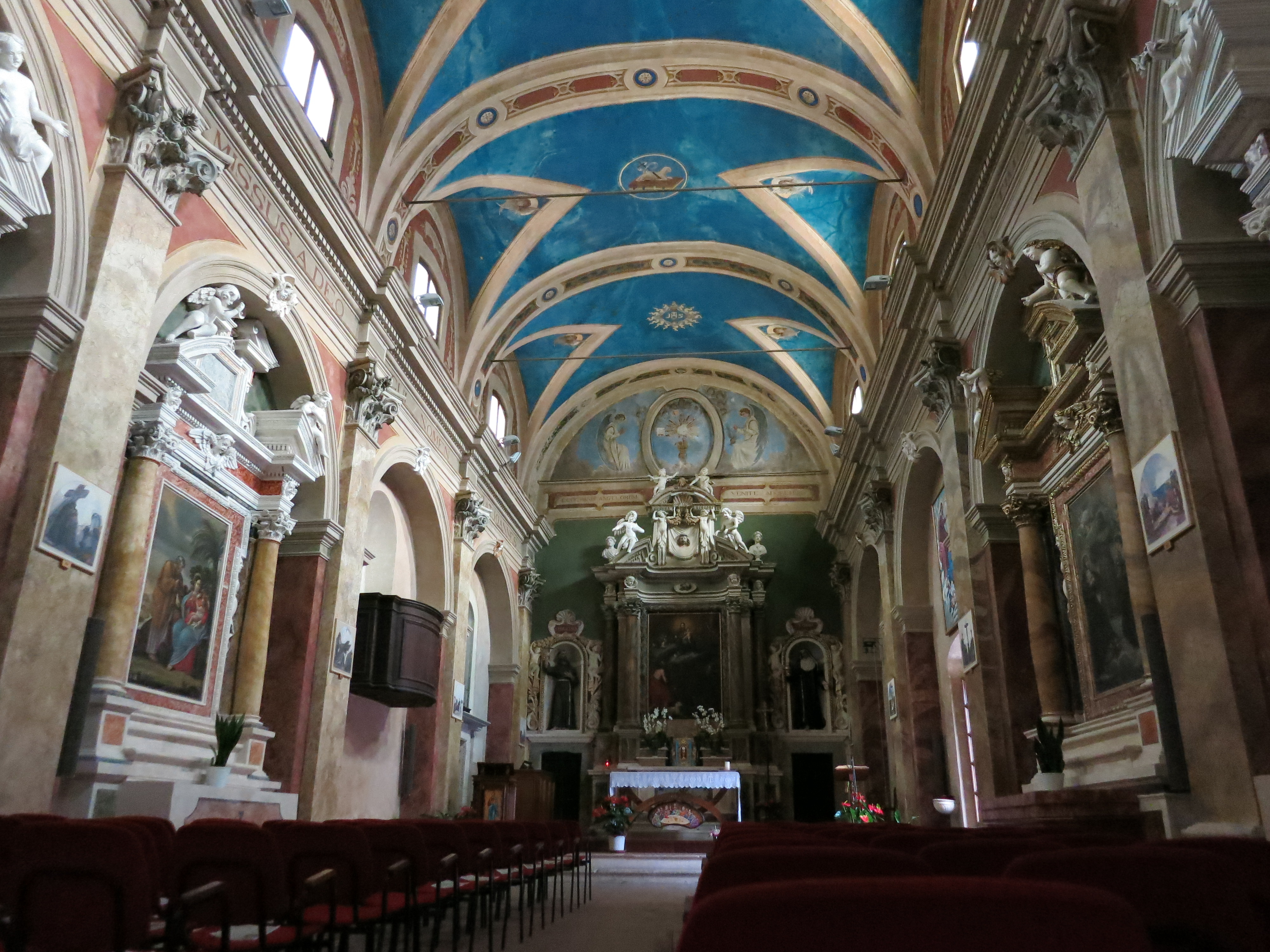
Interior view towards main altar

== History ==
The adjacent hostel, dedicated to St Antony or St John, was built to service the often ill pilgrims en route on the Via Salaria to Rome, dates to the 14th century; but the clarissan monastery was not founded until 1607. The hostal closed in 1906. It is not clear when the monastery was closed. The church was reconsecrated in 2012.

The exterior is plain, and the entrance portal is through side doors, with only high windows providing light.

Over the last centuries, the restorations removed earlier frescoes, but the altars and nave have Baroque style. The lateral altars have 18th-century altarpieces and statues of Saints John the Baptist and Antony. Above the entrance was the cloistered cantory used by the cloistered nuns to attend service. The "Via Crucis" were painted by Lin Deija, for whom is named a museum of sacred art is located in the former convent.
