= Cascata delle Marmore =

Waterfall in Umbria, Italy and tallest man-made waterfall in the world

Coordinates: 42.552448°N 12.714958°E

- Marmore Falls
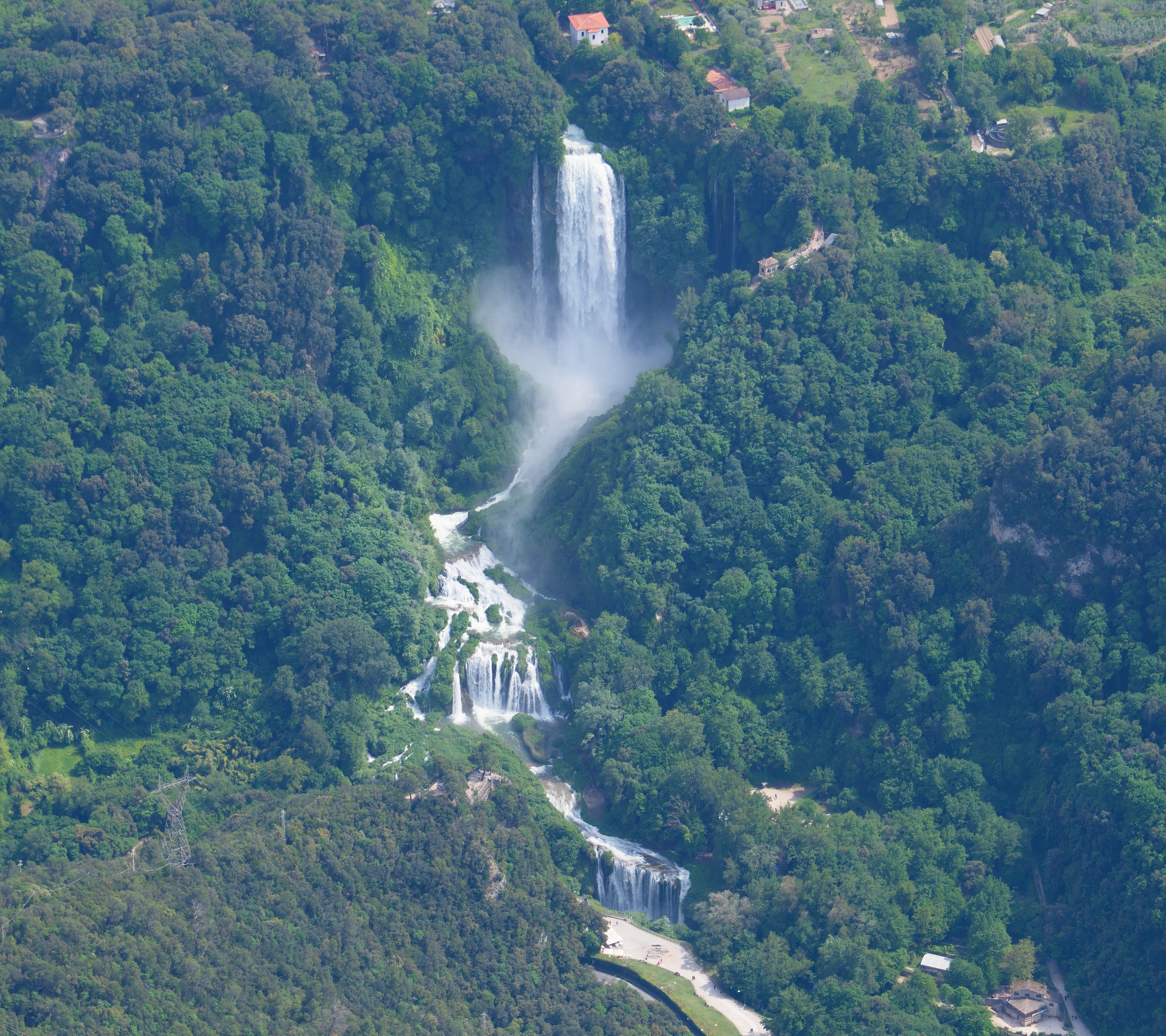
- Aerial view of the Cascata delle Marmore in full operation
- Interactive map of Cascata delle Marmore
- Location: Umbria, Italy
- Type: Tiered
- Total height: 165 m (541 ft)
- Number of drops: 3
- Longest drop: 83 m (272 ft)
- World height ranking: 1st (man-made)

The Cascata delle Marmore (Italian: [kaˈskaːta delle ˈmarmore]) or Marmore Falls is a tiered, man-made waterfall in Italy, created by the Romans in 271 BC. At 165m (541 feet) tall, it is the largest man-made waterfall in the world. It is located 7.7 km from Terni, in the region of Umbria.

== History ==
In ancient times, the Velino River fed a wetland in the Rieti Valley. In 271 BC, in order to reclaim the land (and to possibly remove the supposed threat of malaria to the nearby city of Rieti), the Roman consul Manius Curius Dentatus ordered the construction of a canal (the Curiano Trench) to divert the stagnant waters over the cliff near Marmore, thus directing it into the Nera River below.

Lack of maintenance in the canal resulted in a decrease of flow that eventually allowed the wetland to reappear. In 1422, Pope Gregory XII ordered the construction of a new canal to restore the original flow (the Gregorian Trench or Rieti Trench). In 1545, Pope Paul III ordered that a new canal be built (the Pauline Trench). The plan was to expand the Curiano Trench and to build a regulating valve to control the flow. Upon its completion in 1598, Pope Clement VIII inaugurated the new work and named it after himself: the Clementine Trench. Over the following two centuries, the canal and the Nera often created flooding issues for the valley below. In 1787, Pope Pius VI ordered architect Andrea Vici to modify the leaps below the falls, giving the falls their present look and finally resolving the majority of the problems.

Lord Byron visited the waterfall and referenced it in the narrative poem Childe Harold's Pilgrimage, published between 1812 and 1818.

In 1896, the newly formed steel mills in Terni began using the water flow in the Curiano Trench to power their operation. In the following years, engineers began using the water flow to generate electricity.

== Current status ==
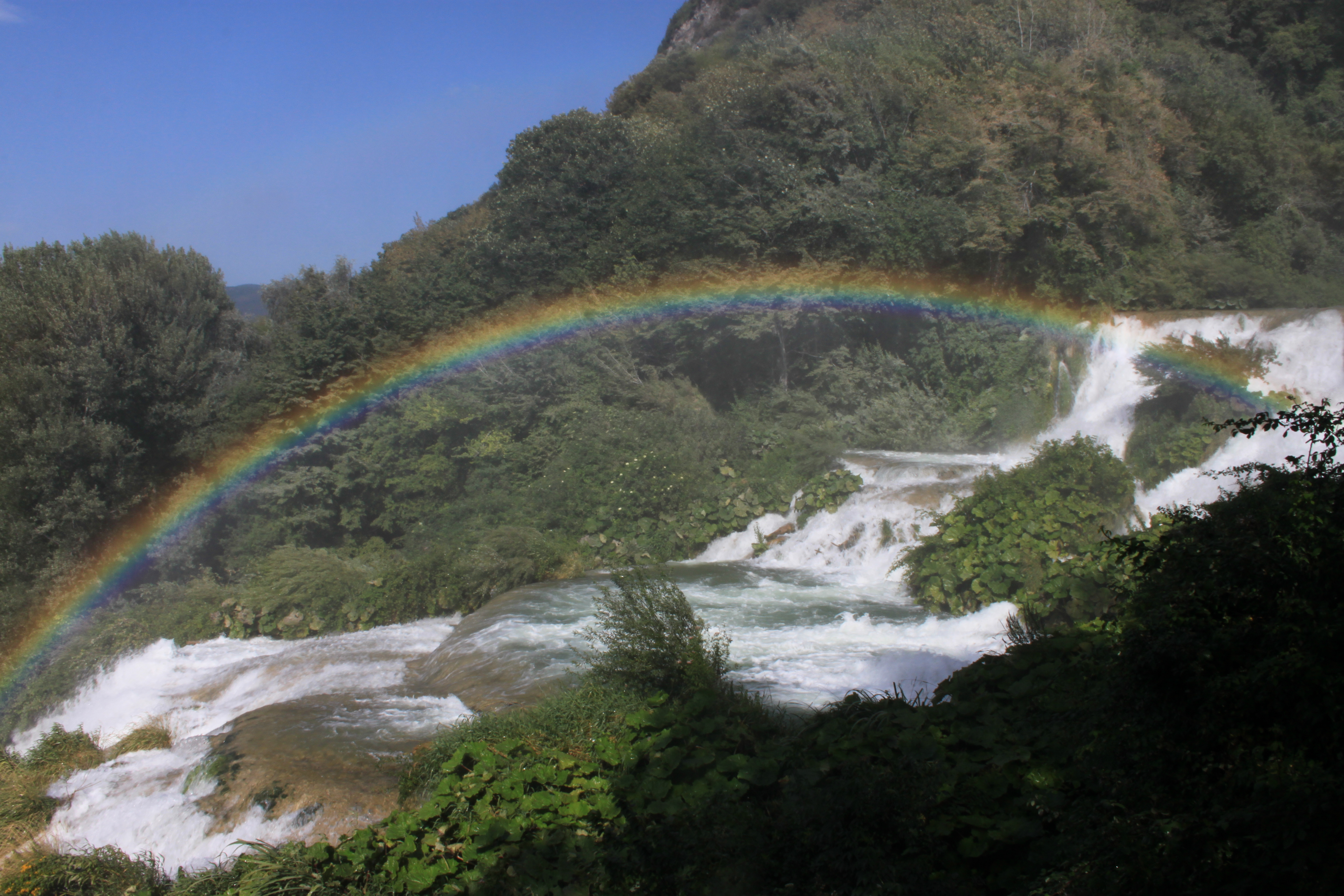
A rainbow seen in the falls

Typically, the water in the canals above the falls is diverted to the Galleto hydroelectric power plant, reducing the flow over the falls. Established in 1929, the Galleto plant has a capacity of roughly 530 MW. Piediluco Lake, situated above the falls, acts as a reservoir for this power plant. To manage the power plant's operation and cater to tourists, the falls operate on a set schedule.

The falls usually flow from 12:00 to 13:00 and again from 16:00 to 17:00 daily, with extended hours on holidays. There is an entrance fee to access the falls and its nearby areas. Visitors can follow a path leading to the falls' summit. En route, a tunnel provides access to an observatory adjacent to the falls. Another observatory near the peak offers a panoramic view of both the falls and the Nera Valley below.

== See also ==
- List of waterfalls
- List of waterfalls by height
