= Antrodoco =

- Comune
- Comune di Antrodoco
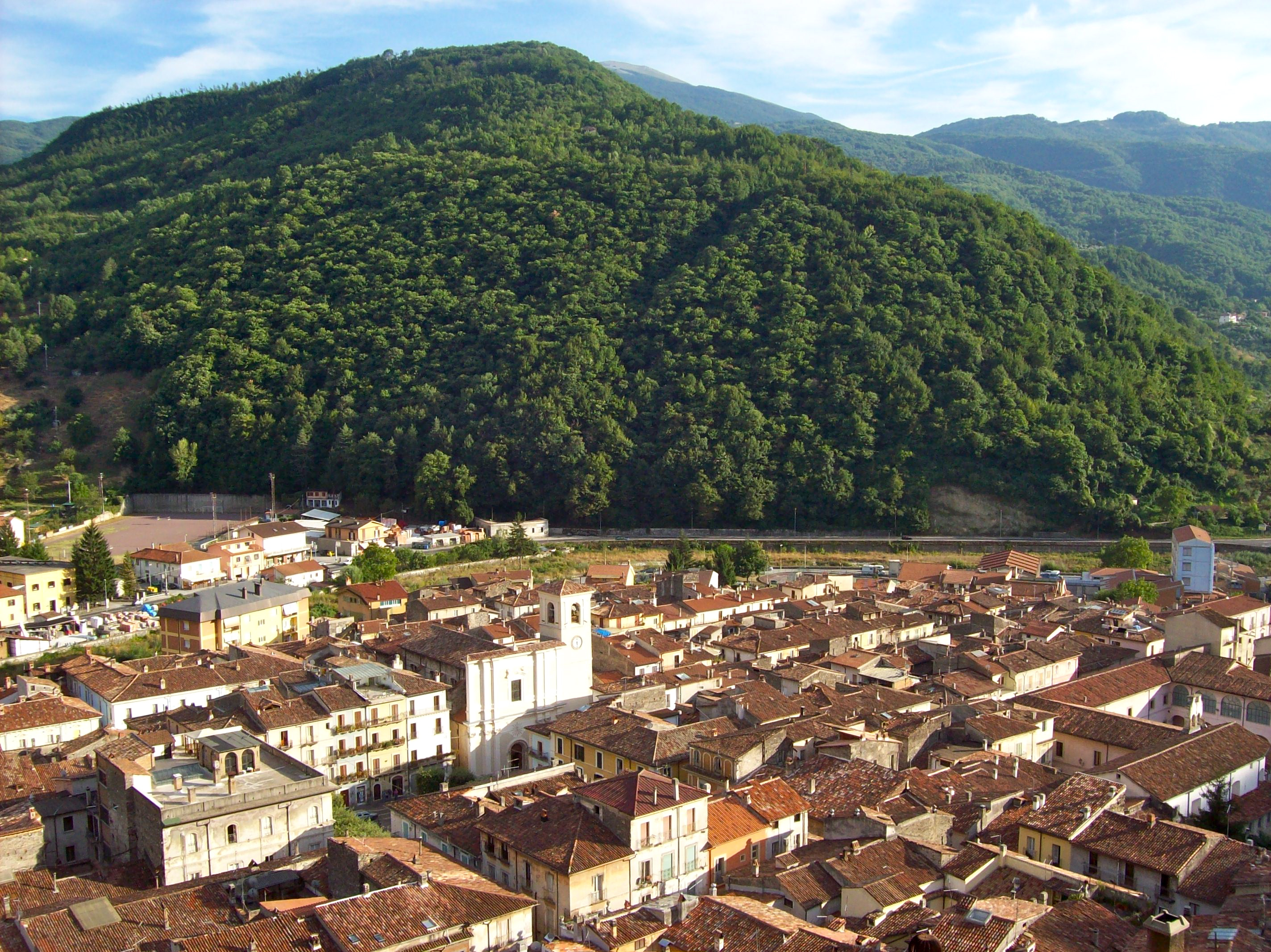
- View of Antrodoco

- Coat of arms

- Location within Italy Location within Lazio
- Coordinates: 42°25′N 13°05′E
- Country: Italy
- Region: Lazio
- Province: Rieti (RI)
- Frazioni: Rocca di Corno, Rocca di Fondi

Government
  - Mayor: Alberto Guerrieri

Area
  - Total: 63.9 km^{2} (24.7 sq mi)
- Elevation: 525 m (1,722 ft)

Population (31 March 2017)
  - Total: 2,542
  - Density: 39.8/km^{2} (103/sq mi)
- Demonym: Antrodocani
- Time zone: UTC+1 (CET)
  - Summer (DST): UTC+2 (CEST)
- Postal code: 02013
- Dialing code: 0746
- Patron saint: St. Anne
- Saint day: 26 July
- Website: Official website

Antrodoco (Sabino: 'Ndreócu) is a town and comune in the province of Rieti, in the Lazio region of central Italy. The name derives from the Latin Interocrea (between the mountains).

== Geography ==
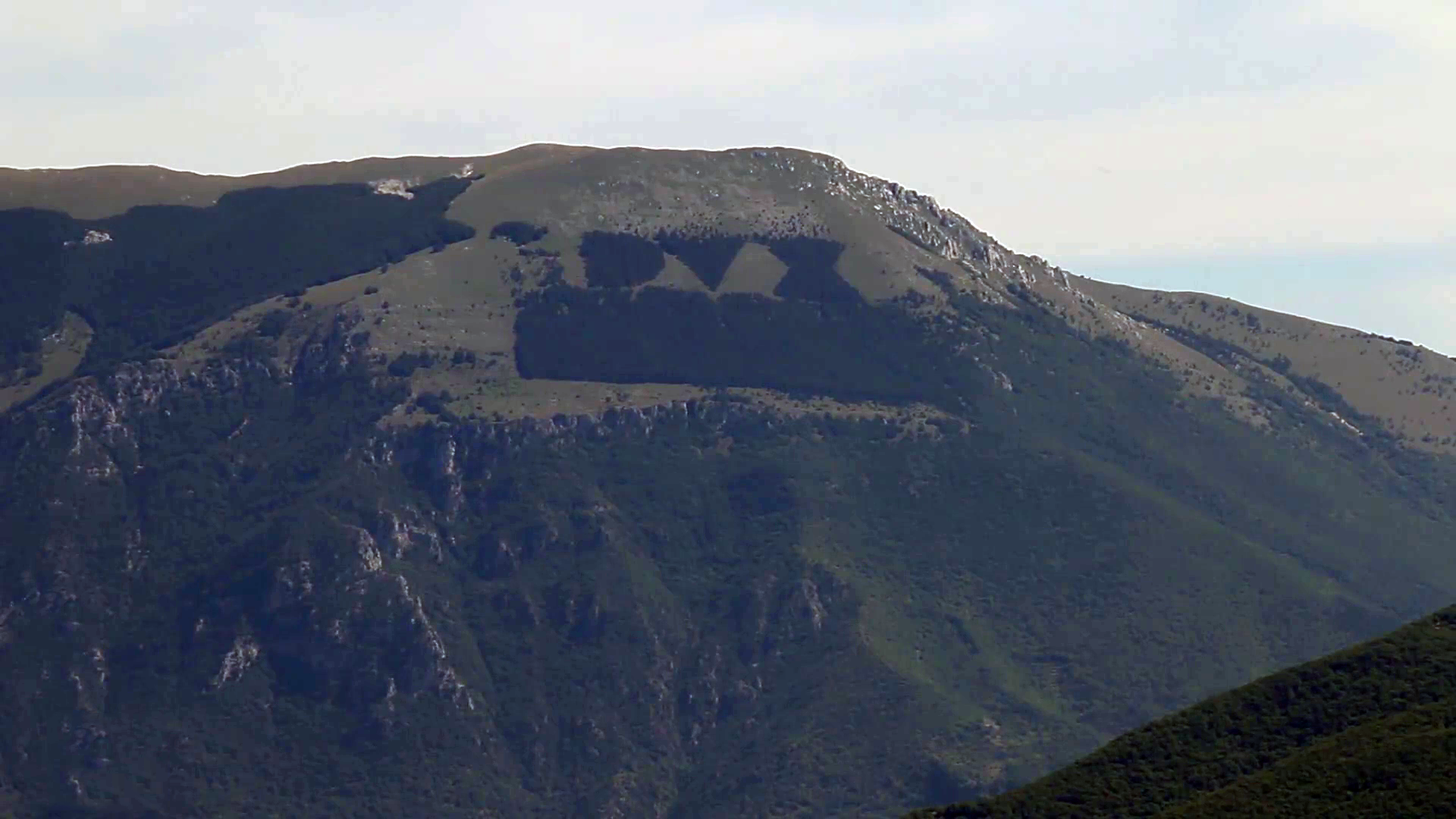
Monte Giano with the "DVX" inscription

Antrodoco is located along the Velino river, in the confluence point of two apennine valleys: the Velino valley, at North, and the Rio creek valley (a tributary of Velino) at East. Both are highly suggestive valleys, so narrow that they form canyons with sheer rock over the river: the first canyon is known as Gole del Velino, the latter as Gole di Antrodoco.

Monte Giano, the mountain where Gole di Antrodoco is located, is known for a pine tree forest with the shape of the word "DVX" (Latin for duce) which was planted in 1939 and is visible from miles of distance.

== Main sights ==
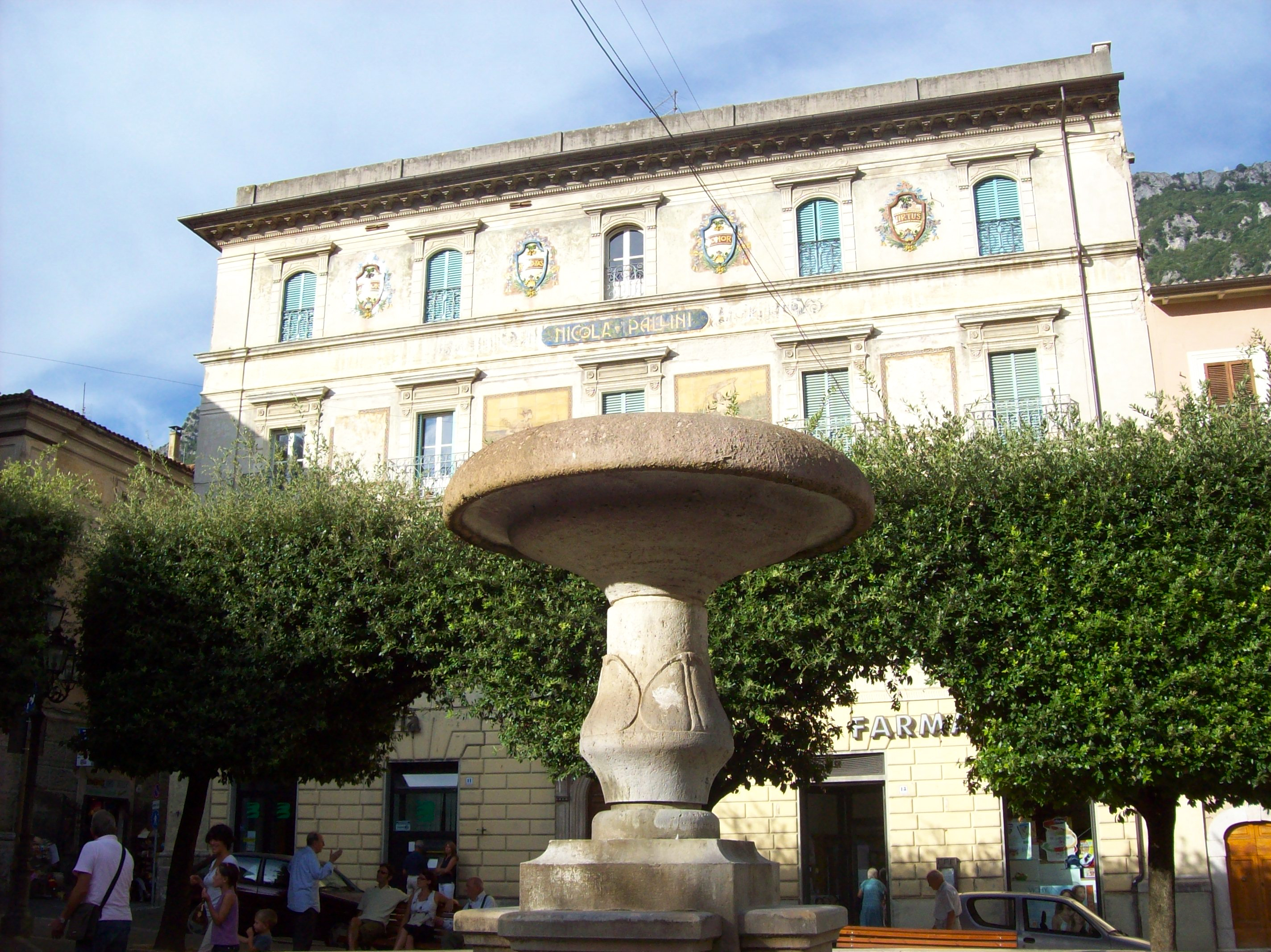
Piazza del Popolo square

- Church of Santa Maria Assunta
- Santa Maria Extra Moenia
- Santa Chiara
- Sant'Agostino

== Transport ==
Thanks to its position, Antrodoco has been an important transportation hub since the time of the Roman Civilization.

Antrodoco was crossed by the ancient Roman road, Via Salaria, and was the starting point of Via Caecilia. The same route is maintained by two modern state highways:

- Strada statale 4 Via Salaria connects Antrodoco with Rome and the province capital Rieti to the west, and with Amatrice, Ascoli Piceno and the Adriatic coast to the north (passing through the Gole del Velino canyon).
- Strada statale 17 dell'Appennino Abruzzese branches from the Salaria in Antrodoco and connects the town with L'Aquila, passing through Gole di Antrodoco.

Antrodoco has a station on the Terni–Sulmona railway, with trains to Terni, Rieti and L'Aquila.
