= Santa Maria Extra Moenia, Antrodoco =

Church building in Antrodoco, Italy

Coordinates: 42°24′43.0″N 13°04′25.4″E

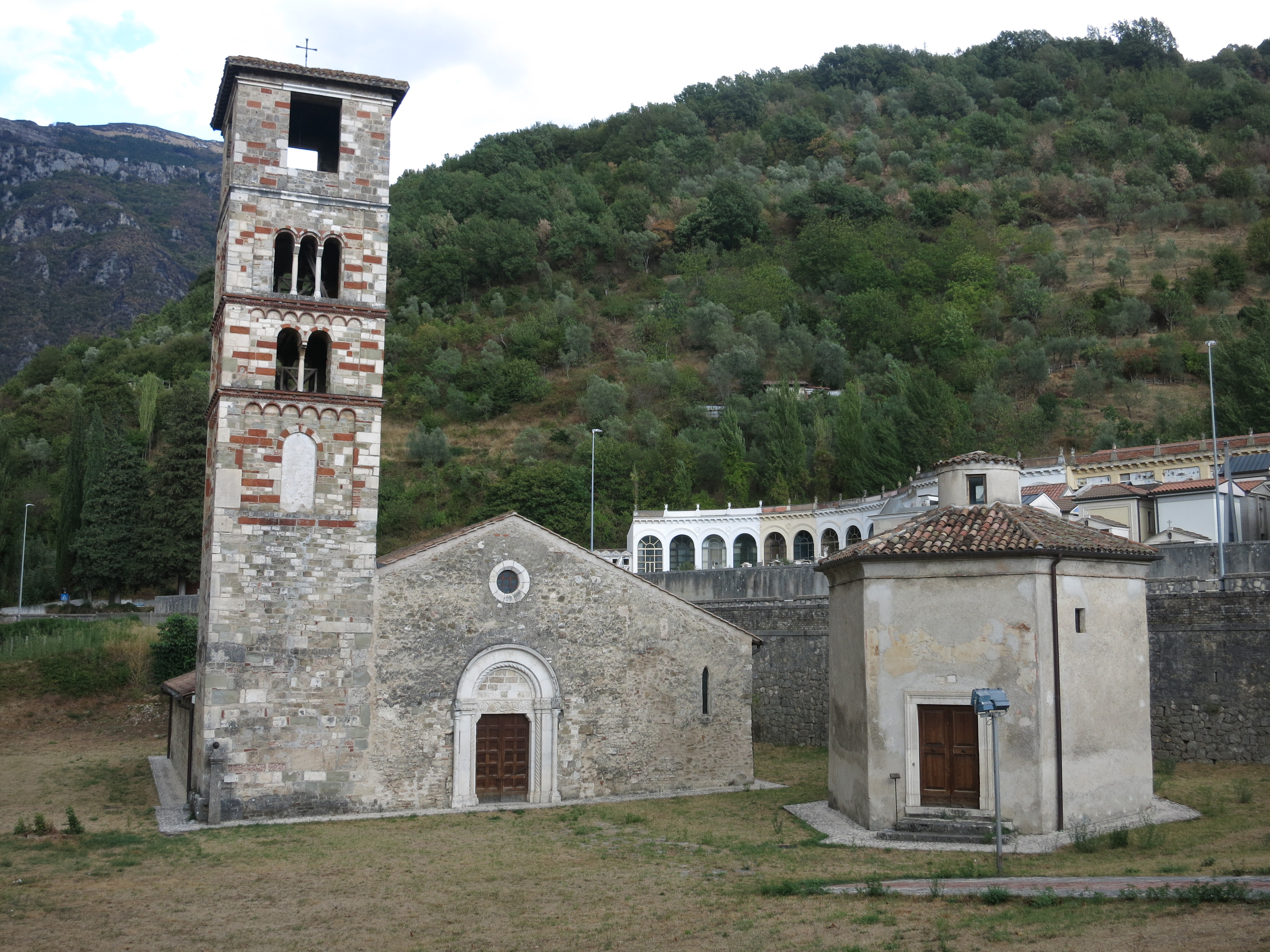
Facade, bell-tower, and baptistry

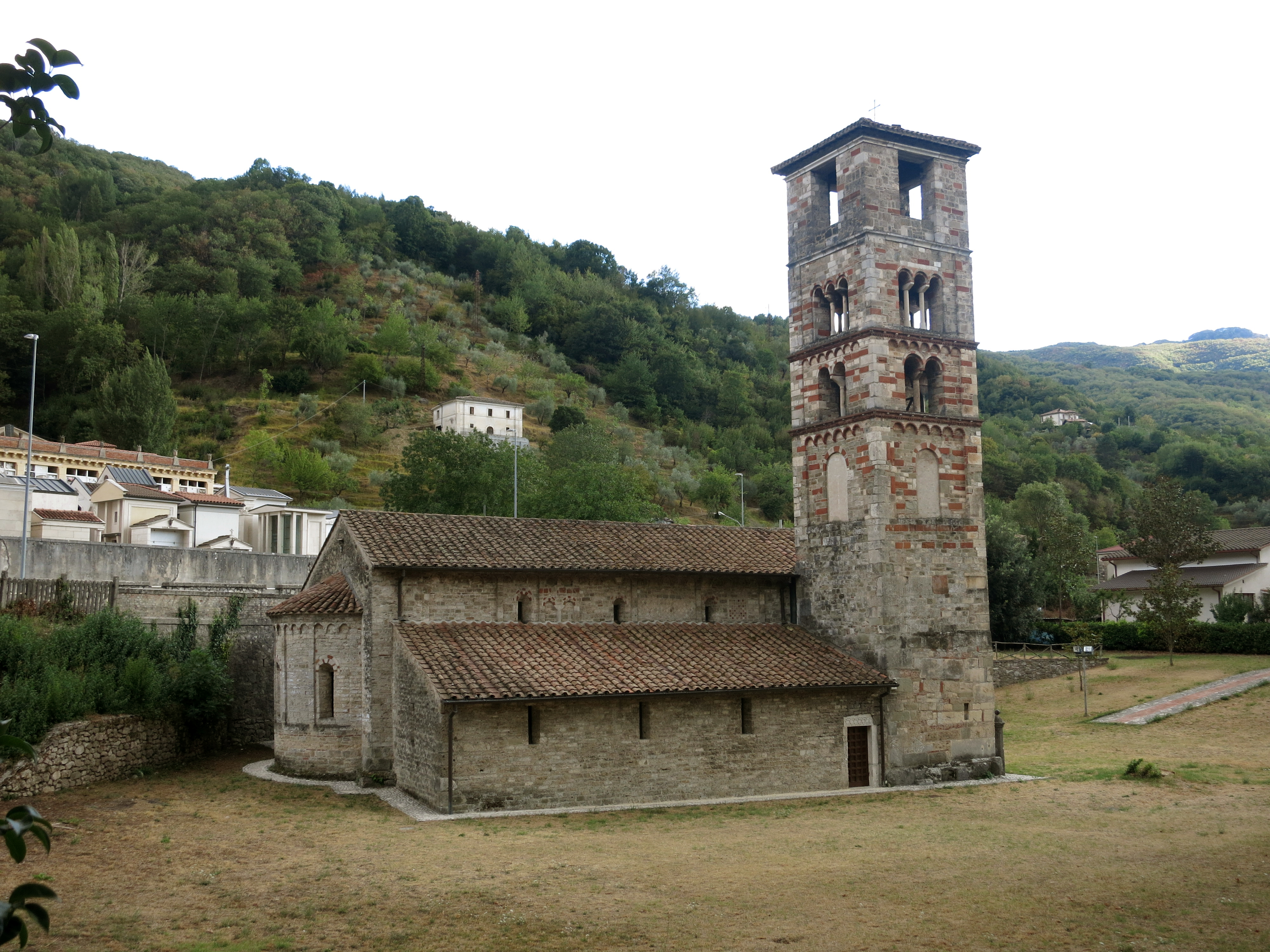
Side view, with view of apse

Santa Maria Extra Moenia (St Mary Outside the Walls), also called Santa Maria della Nave is an early Romanesque-style, Roman Catholic church complex located just outside to the South-West of the town of Antrodoco, province of Rieti, region of Lazio, central Italy. The complex includes a church and attached bell-tower with an adjacent but separate baptistry.

== History ==
A paleochristian church at the site was built here in the 5th century, putatively atop an Ancient Roman temple dedicated to Diana. The site then was adjacent to a Christian cemetery, but the present cemetery is now separated railroad tracks and the SS4 highway. The structures underwent various restorations including in the 9th, 10th, 11th, and 12th centuries. Documents note a reconstructed Santa Maria was reconsecrated in 1054 by Gerard, then Bishop of Rieti; and in 1178 under the rule of Frederick I, Holy Roman Emperor, was again rebuilt. In 1154, the church is mentioned by a bull of Pope Anastasius IV.

The exterior is made of brick and local gray stone. The portal with columns and pilasters has stone designs of animals and plants. Above the portal is a round oculus. The interior has three naves, leading to a semicircular apse. The attached bell-tower has mullioned windows, showing restoration occurring over centuries.

The interior wall of the apse is frescoed with a Redeemer Blessing. Among the other frescoes is a Marriage of St Catherine of Alexandria (early 15th century). The small hexagonal building in front and to the side of the church is the Baptistry of San Giovanni. It contains a series late 14th-century frescoes including ones depicting the Life of John the Baptist, Flight to Egypt, the Murder of the Innocents, and a Final Judgement.
