= Monte Terminillo =

Landform of the Abruzzi Apennine range in Italy

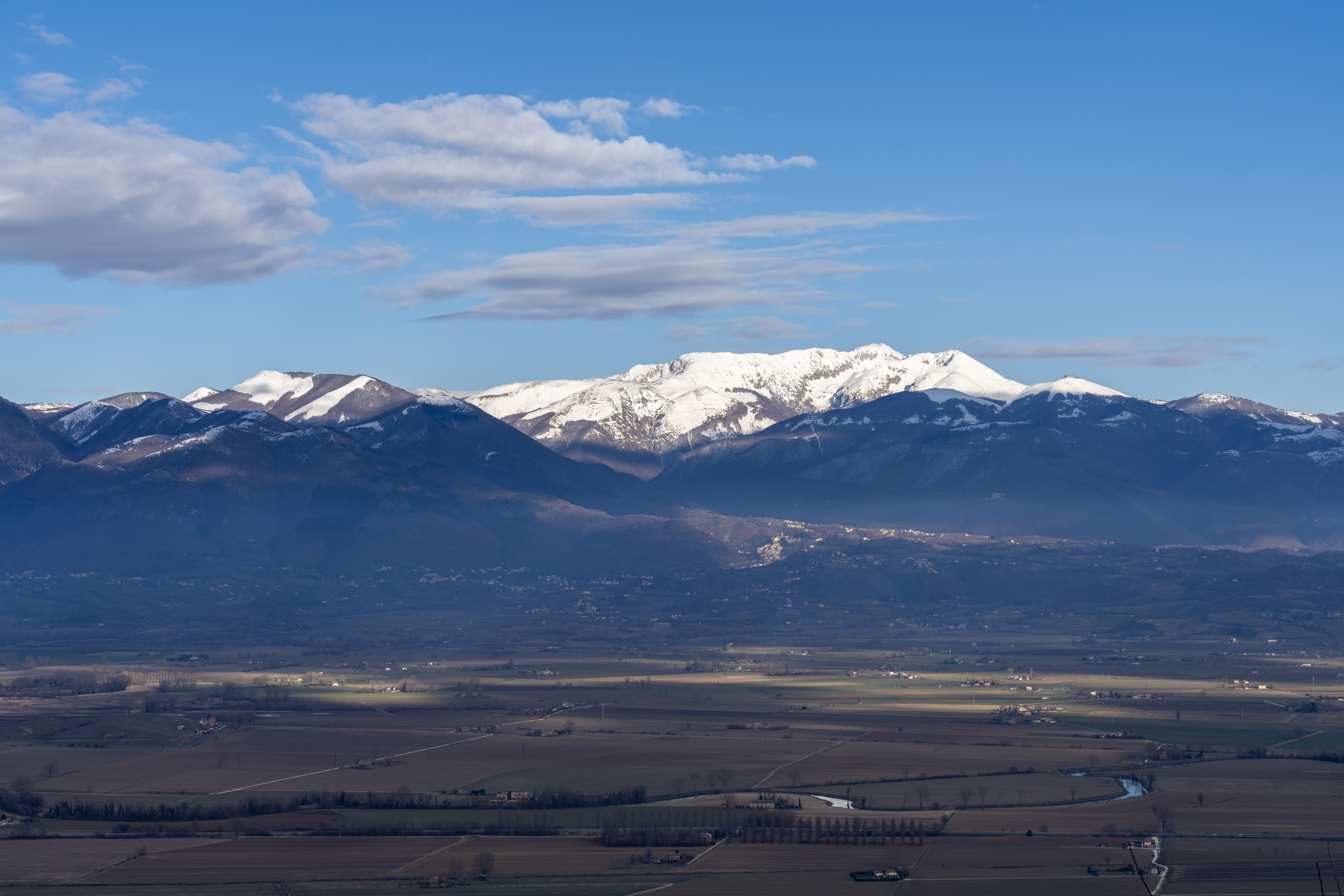
- Terminillo seen from Greccio

Highest point
- Elevation: 2,217 m (7,274 ft)
- Prominence: 1,163 m (3,816 ft)
- Listing: Ribu
- Coordinates: 42°29′N 13°00′E

Naming
- Language of name: Italian

Geography
- Location within Italy
- Location: Lazio, Italy
- Parent range: Apennines

Monte Terminillo is a massif in the Monti Reatini, part of the Abruzzi Apennine range in central Italy. It is located some 20 km from Rieti and 100 km from Rome and has a highest altitude of 2,217 metres (7,274 ft).

It is a typical Apennine massif, both for its morphology, articulated but not exceedingly sharp, and for the fauna and vegetation. Its slopes are separated by the neighbouring smaller massifs by deep valleys, including the Valle Leonina, leading to Leonessa, and the Ravara and Capo Scura valleys leading to that of the Velino River. On the opposite sides are the Valle dell'Inferno ("Hell's Valley") and Valle degli Angeli ("Angels' Valley") leading to Rieti's plain and the mounts of Cantalice.

The Terminillo is an active ski resort.

== Climate ==
Climate data for Monte Terminillo, elevation: 1,874 m or 6,148 ft, 1991–2020 normals
Month	Jan	Feb	Mar	Apr	May	Jun	Jul	Aug	Sep	Oct	Nov	Dec	Year
Mean daily maximum °C (°F)	0.8 (33.4)	0.8 (33.4)	2.9 (37.2)	5.5 (41.9)	10.7 (51.3)	14.5 (58.1)	17.9 (64.2)	18.6 (65.5)	13.2 (55.8)	9.6 (49.3)	4.9 (40.8)	1.7 (35.1)	8.4 (47.2)
Daily mean °C (°F)	−1.7 (28.9)	−1.9 (28.6)	0.2 (32.4)	2.7 (36.9)	7.3 (45.1)	11.3 (52.3)	14.4 (57.9)	15.1 (59.2)	10.1 (50.2)	6.9 (44.4)	2.4 (36.3)	−0.9 (30.4)	5.5 (41.9)
Mean daily minimum °C (°F)	−3.8 (25.2)	−4.1 (24.6)	−2.1 (28.2)	0.3 (32.5)	4.6 (40.3)	8.7 (47.7)	11.5 (52.7)	12.1 (53.8)	7.7 (45.9)	4.6 (40.3)	0.5 (32.9)	−2.8 (27.0)	3.1 (37.6)
Average precipitation mm (inches)	28.6 (1.13)	34.2 (1.35)	43.6 (1.72)	51.5 (2.03)	48.8 (1.92)	31.0 (1.22)	26.8 (1.06)	28.1 (1.11)	59.1 (2.33)	64.8 (2.55)	71.7 (2.82)	47.0 (1.85)	535.2 (21.09)
Average precipitation days (≥ 1.0 mm)	4.50	3.97	5.17	6.34	5.79	3.21	2.70	3.26	4.11	5.25	6.36	4.07	54.73
Average relative humidity (%)	76.3	76.3	78.9	78.7	77	74.9	69.6	69.4	78.8	77.1	81.3	79	76.4
Average dew point °C (°F)	−5.9 (21.4)	−5.9 (21.4)	−3.2 (26.2)	−0.6 (30.9)	3.6 (38.5)	7.0 (44.6)	8.9 (48.0)	9.4 (48.9)	6.6 (43.9)	2.8 (37.0)	−0.6 (30.9)	−4.5 (23.9)	1.5 (34.6)
Mean monthly sunshine hours	112.2	116.7	144.7	139	183.8	213.3	271.6	257.5	182.1	145.7	105	96.8	1,968.4
Source: NOAA, (Sun for 1981-2010)

== See also ==
- Sabena Flight 503
