= Velino =

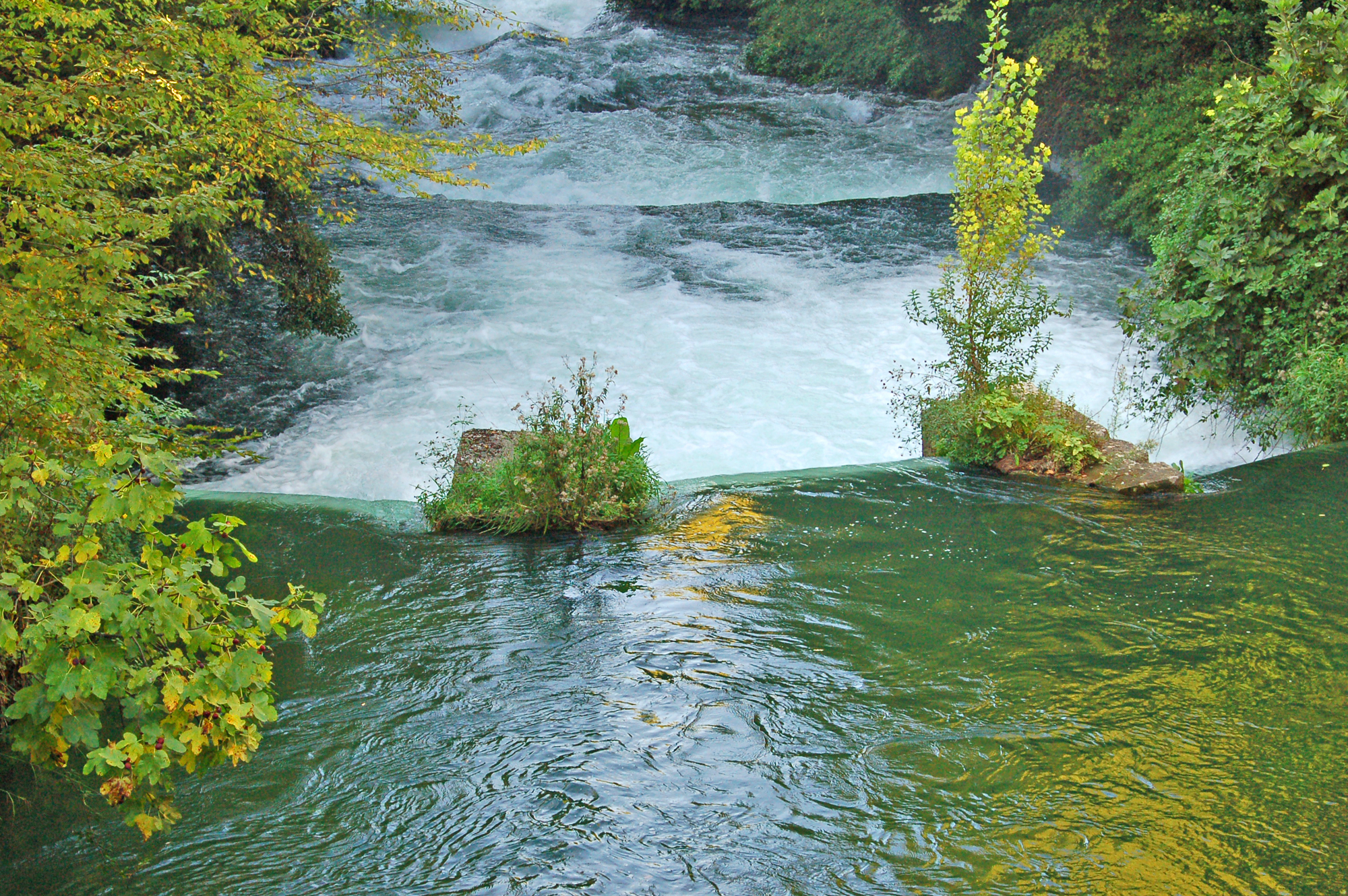
- The Velino River before the Cascata delle Marmore

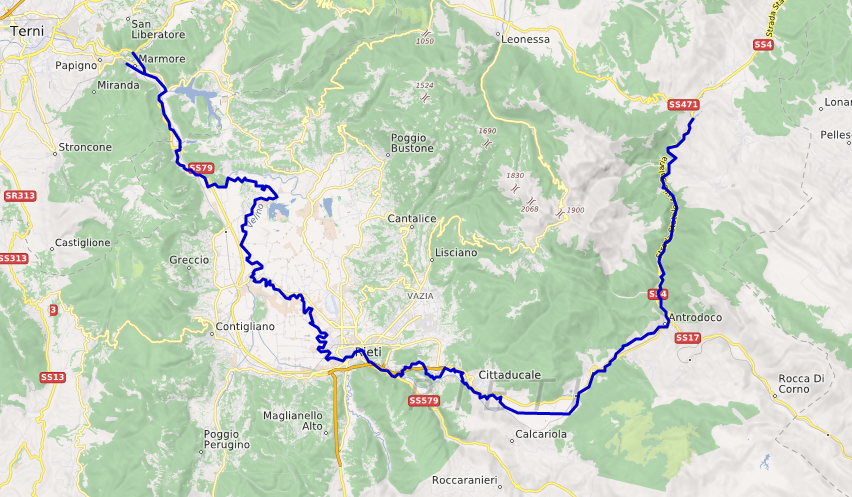

Location
- Country: Italy

Physical characteristics
- Source
  - location: Monte Pizzuto
- Mouth: Nera
  - coordinates: 42.5533°N 12.7138°E
- Length: 90 km (56 mi)
- Basin size: 2,238 km^{2} (864 sq mi)
- Discharge
  - average: 60 m^{3}/s (2,100 cu ft/s)

Basin features
- Progression: Nera→ Tiber→ Tyrrhenian Sea

The Velino is a river in central Italy, a tributary of the Nera. Its source is located on Monte Pozzoni's slopes (1,903 m) near Cittareale. Afterwards, it runs through a narrow valley next the Mount Terminillo, known as "Gole del Vento" ("Wind's Ravines") and, near Antrodoco, receives the Peschiera Springs, which have a discharge of some 18 m^{3}/s (9.5 m^{3}/s is sent to Rome through an aqueduct).

Then, it receives the waters of its left tributaries Salto and Turano, and then enters the plain of Rieti, where its discharge if further increased by other minor streams to reach 60 m^{3}/s. Near Papigno, it falls into the Nera forming the famous Cascate delle Marmore falls.

In pre-Roman times, the river ended in a marsh within the plain of Rieti. The falls were created by consul Manius Curius Dentatus and enlarged in medieval times, being updated to the current state in the 18th century by architect Andrea Vici.
