= Monti Reatini =

Mountain range in the central Apennines

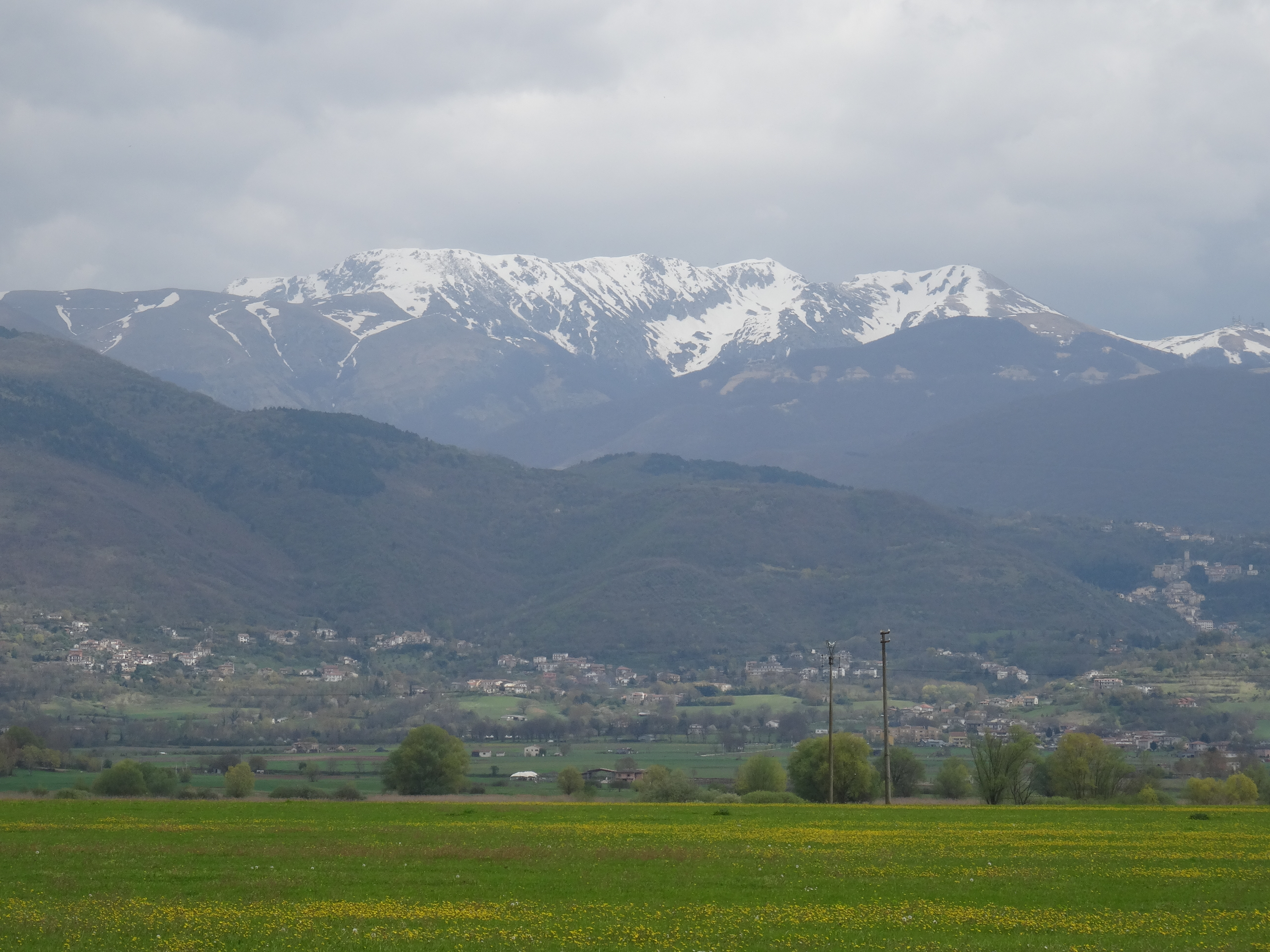

Highest point
- Elevation: 2,217 m (7,274 ft)
- Coordinates: 42°29′N 13°00′E

Geography
- Location within Italy
- Location: Italy
- Parent range: Abruzzi Apennines

Monti Reatini is a mountain range in the central Apennines, Italy.The highest peak is the Monte Terminillo (2217 m), home to ski resorts and a favorite destination of tourism
