= San Michele Arcangelo =

San Michele Arcangelo (Italian for "Saint Michael [the] Archangel") may refer to:

- San Michele Arcangelo ai Corridori di Borgo in Rome
- San Michele Arcangelo a Pietralata in Rome
- San Michele Arcangelo in Sant'Angelo in Lizzola
- San Michele Arcangelo ai Minoriti, Catania
- San Michele Arcangelo, Anacapri
- San Michele Arcangelo, Antegnate
- San Michele Arcangelo, Ausonia
- San Michele Arcangelo, Bolognola
- San Michele Arcangelo, Borgo d'Ale
- San Michele Arcangelo, Contigliano
- San Michele Arcangelo, Fermo
- San Michele Arcangelo, Grammichele
- San Michele Arcangelo, Greccio
- San Michele Arcangelo, Marsico Nuovo
- San Michele Arcangelo, Montasola
- San Michele Arcangelo, Naples
- San Michele Arcangelo, Ostiano
- San Michele Arcangelo, Paganico
- San Michele Arcangelo, Perugia
- San Michele Arcangelo, Potenza
- San Michele Arcangelo, Rivodutri
- San Michele Arcangelo, Sermoneta
- San Michele Arcangelo, Scicli
- San Michele Arcangelo, Trecasali
- San Michele Arcangelo, Venice
- San Michele Arcangelo, Verghereto
- San Michele Arcangelo, Volterra

== See also ==
- Michele (disambiguation)
- San Michele (disambiguation)
- Collegiata di San Michele Arcangelo (disambiguation)
- Hermitage of San Michele Arcangelo, Pescocostanzo
