= San Lorenzo, Contigliano =

Church building in Contigliano, Italy

Coordinates: 42°24′10.0″N 12°46′19.8″E

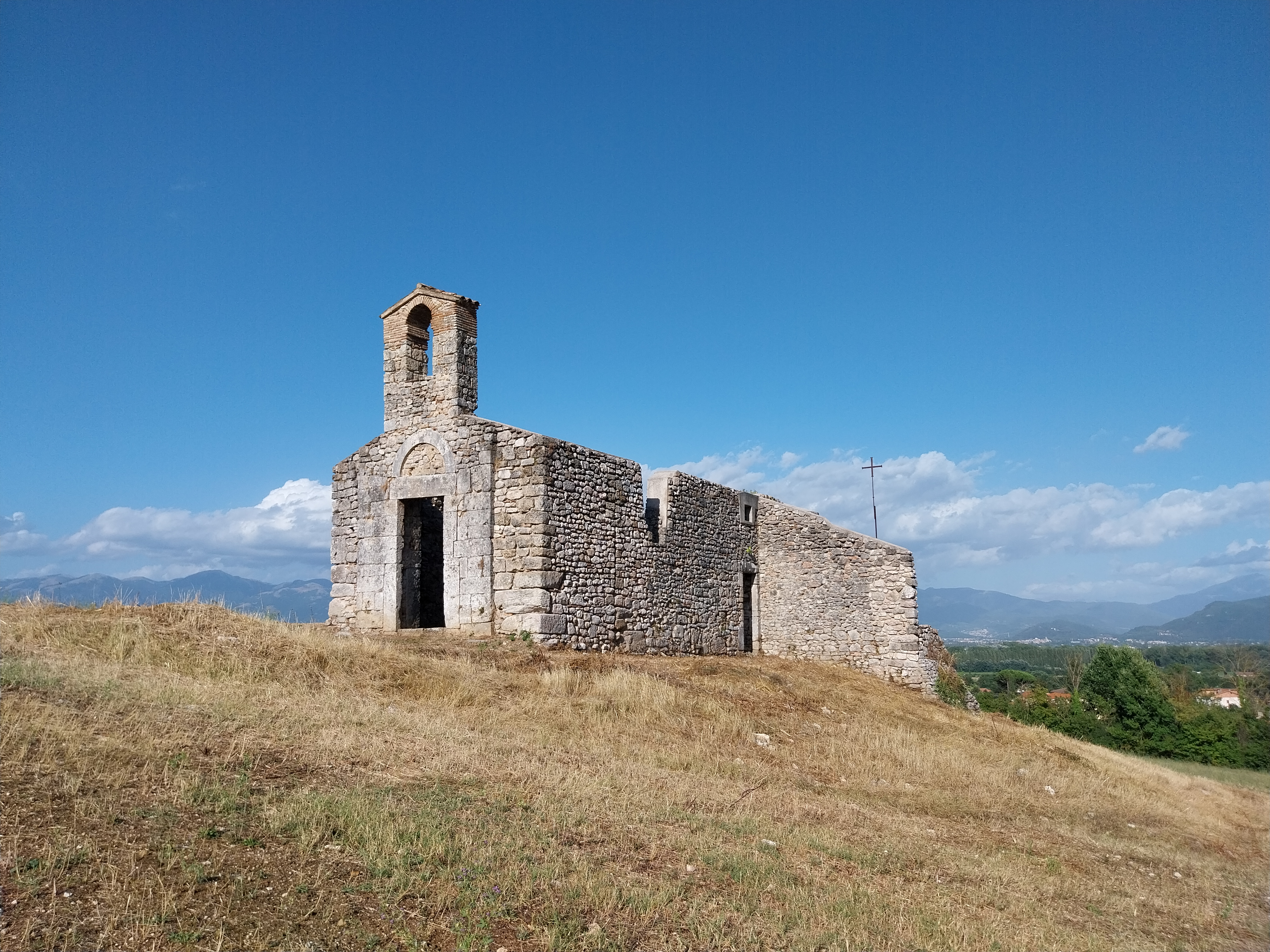
San Lorenzo

San Lorenzo in Quintiliano (Italian: St Lawrence) is a small Romanesque-style, Roman Catholic church, located on a hilltop just outside the town of Contigliano, in the province of Rieti, region of Lazio, Italy. The church has no roof, and remains a deconsecrated ruin.

== History ==
The stone church was built by the Cistercian order in the 12th century, at the site of a prior Ancient Roman Villa. The church soon fell into decay with the founding the larger church of San Michele Arcangelo inside the city walls. Made from hewn stones, the facade has a bell in the sail-type tympanum. Presently without a roof, restoration of the site began in 2014, replacing the altar and baptismal font to their original position.

In June of 1944, townspeople taken as hostages were massacred by the German army at this site.
