= San Salvatore, Casperia =

Roman Catholic church in Rieti province, Italy

Coordinates: 42°19′42″N 12°39′59″E

San Salvatore (Holy Saviour) is a Roman Catholic church and monastery located atop Monte Fiolo outside of the town of Casperia, province of Rieti, region of Lazio, central Italy. It is also known as the Convent of Monte Fioli.

== History ==
The first documented mention of this church is in 1343 by Cardinal Pietro Gomez de Barros, Bishop of Sabina. A Capuchin convent was established at the sight, but by 1868 the monastery was suppressed and the property assigned to the commune of Aspra. In 1882, the Seminario Lombardo acquired the convent and lands and pursued some refurbishments. In 1936, Monsignor Gulio Belvedere, secretary of the Pontifical Institute of Christian Archeology acquired the property, and assigned it the Benedictine Oblates of Priscilla (nuns), who still operated a spiritual retreats for priests in training as well as the lay public.

The interior of the church contains a main altarpiece depicting Saints Francis, Bernardino of Siena, Antony of Padua, and Carlo Borromeo in Adoration of the Virgin (1619) by Girolamo Bottacchioli. In addition there is a depiction of Michael Archangel defeating demons, alongside Saints Catherine, Alexandrina, Mary Magdalen, and Clare of Assisi. Behind the altar is a sarcophagus with the relics of Monsignor Belvedere with an inscription from the telegram of Pope John XXIII sent upon his death.
