= San Michele =

San Michele is the Italian name of Saint Michael. It may also refer to:

== Places in Italy ==
- San Michele all'Adige, a municipality of the Province of Trento, Trentino-Südtirol
- San Michele al Tagliamento, a municipality of the Province of Venice, Veneto
- San Michele di Ganzaria, a municipality of the Province of Catania, Sicily
- San Michele di Serino, a municipality of the Province of Avellino, Campania
- San Michele Mondovì, a municipality of the Province of Cuneo, Piedmont
- San Michele Salentino, a municipality of the Province of Brindisi, Apulia
- San Michele Tiorre, a hamlet of Felino (PR), Emilia-Romagna
- Dusino San Michele, a municipality of the Province of Asti, Piedmont
- Olivetta San Michele, a municipality of the Province of Imperia, Liguria

== Churches in Italy ==
- San Michele Arcangelo (disambiguation)
- San Michele e San Francesco, Carmignano
- San Michele, Cremona
- San Michele Visdomini, Florence
- San Michele in Foro, Lucca
- Church of San Michele, Maddaloni
- San Michele Abbey, Monticchio, an abbey in Basilicata
- San Michele Maggiore, Pavia
- San Michele in Borgo, Pisa
- San Michele in Isola, Venice
- San Michele Extra, Verona

== Other ==
- Isola di San Michele, an island cemetery of Venice
- Villa San Michele, on the island of Capri
