= Bolognola =

- Comune
- Comune di Bolognola
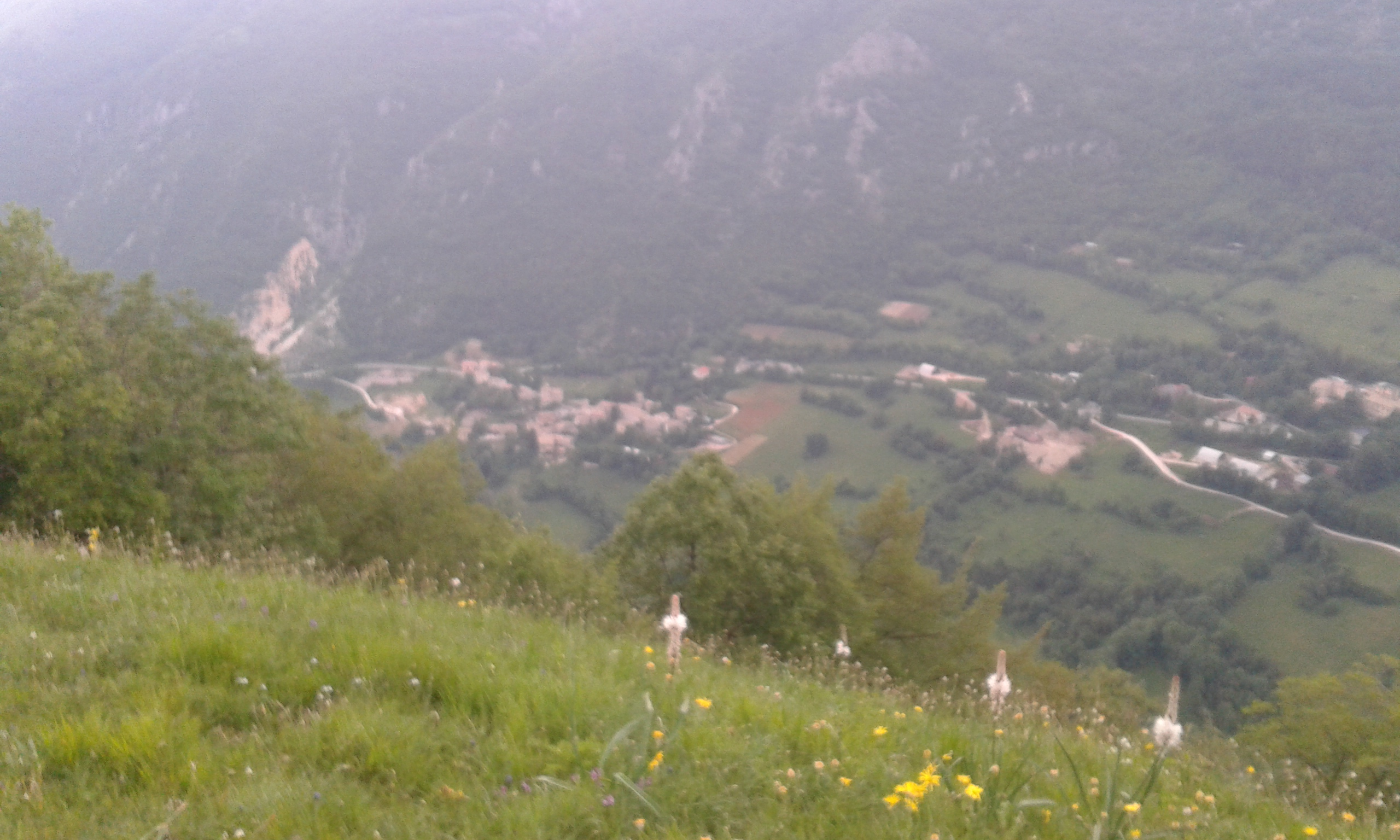

- Coat of arms

- Location within Italy Location within Marche
- Coordinates: 43°0′N 13°14′E
- Country: Italy
- Region: Marche
- Province: Macerata (MC)

Government
  - Mayor: Cristina Gentili

Area
  - Total: 25.88 km^{2} (9.99 sq mi)
- Elevation: 1,070 m (3,510 ft)

Population (30 April 2017)
  - Total: 138
  - Density: 5.33/km^{2} (13.8/sq mi)
- Demonym: Bolognolesi
- Time zone: UTC+1 (CET)
  - Summer (DST): UTC+2 (CEST)
- Postal code: 62033
- Dialing code: 0737
- Patron saint: St. Fortunatus

Bolognola is a comune (municipality) in the Province of Macerata in the Italian region Marche, located about 70 kilometres (43 mi) southwest of Ancona and about 40 kilometres (25 mi) southwest of Macerata.

Bolognola borders the following municipalities: Fiastra, Montefortino, Sarnano, Ussita.

== Main sights ==
The town is home to the church of San Michele Arcangelo.
