= Giulio Vergari =

Italian painter

Giulio Vergari was an Italian painter of the Renaissance period, active in the Marche in the early 16th century.

He was born in Amandola. A Canvas depicting a Madonna del Soccorso, wherein the Madonna wields a club against a demon afflicting a child is on display in the Pinacoteca Fortunato Duranti in Montefortino, Province of Fermo. He painted a polyptych now found in the church of San Michele Arcangelo, Bolognola.
