= Collegiata di San Michele Arcangelo =

Collegiata di San Michele Arcangelo may refer to:

- Collegiata di San Michele Arcangelo, Lucignano
- Collegiata di San Michele Arcangelo, Solofra

== See also ==
- San Michele Arcangelo (disambiguation)
