= Santa Maria del Colle =

Church of Santa Maria del Colle
- Basilica di Santa Maria del Colle
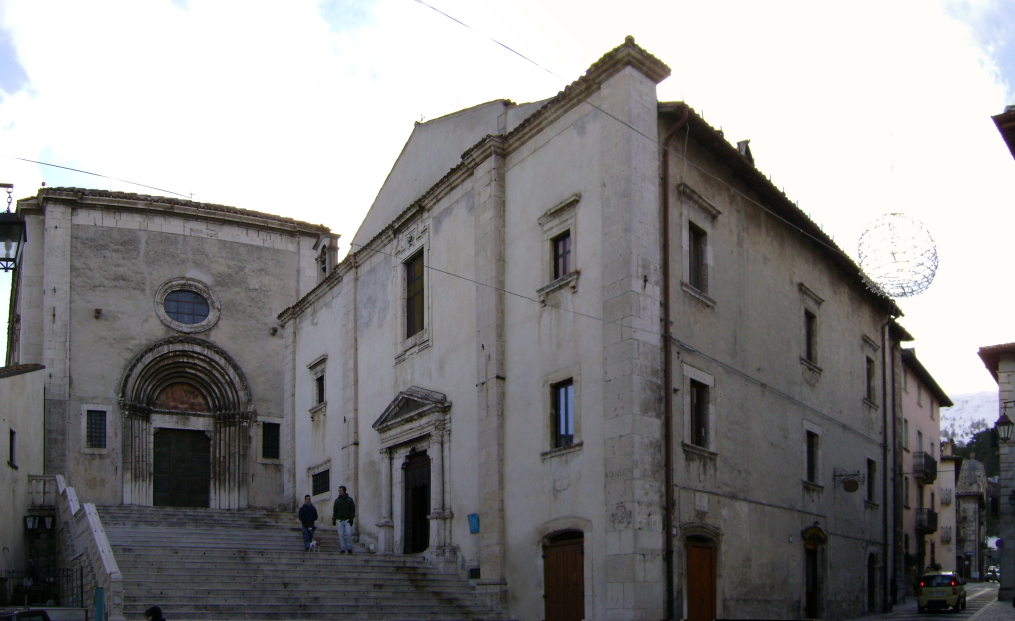
- View of the church

- Location within Abruzzo
- 41.889054°N 14.06519°E
- Location: Pescocostanzo
- Country: Italy
- Denomination: Catholic

History
- Status: Basilica

Architecture
- Functional status: Active
- Style: Renaissance
- Completed: 15th century

Administration
- Diocese: Sulmona-Valva

Basilica di Santa Maria del Colle (Italian for Basilica of Santa Maria del Colle) is a Renaissance basilica in Pescocostanzo, Province of L'Aquila (Abruzzo).

== History ==
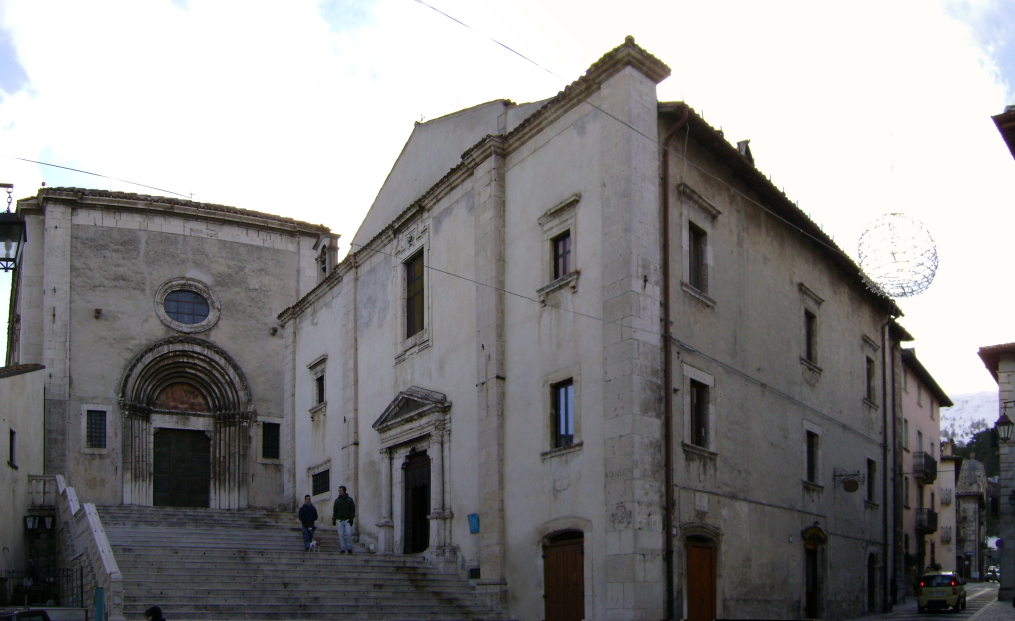
On the left, at the top of the staircase, the northern entrance of the basilica; on the right, the Church of Santa Maria del Suffragio dei Morti

The first temple, dating back to the 11th century and dependent on the Montecassino Abbey, was located outside the town center, perched on the Peschio, while the parish church was under the jurisdiction of the Bishop of Sulmona. In 1456, the church was destroyed by an earthquake but was rebuilt by 1466 in the new, more extensive town center, becoming the parish seat and thus linking the entire village to the Diocese of Cassino.

Between 1556 and 1558, the building was expanded to five naves of four bays, as it appears today, compared to the three naves and three bays of the 15th-century structure, and a new façade in Renaissance style was constructed, overlooking a large terrace. The ancient Romanesque-Gothic portal was moved in 1580 to the entrance of the northern side, at the top of a flight of stairs.

In the years 1691 to 1694, the Chapel of the Sacrament was built. The bell tower, dating back to the late 16th century, was restored in 1635 and 1855, when the octagonal spire was replaced with a quadrangular one. Already designated as a Collegiata, in 1978, Santa Maria del Colle was elevated to the dignity of a minor basilica.

== Architecture ==
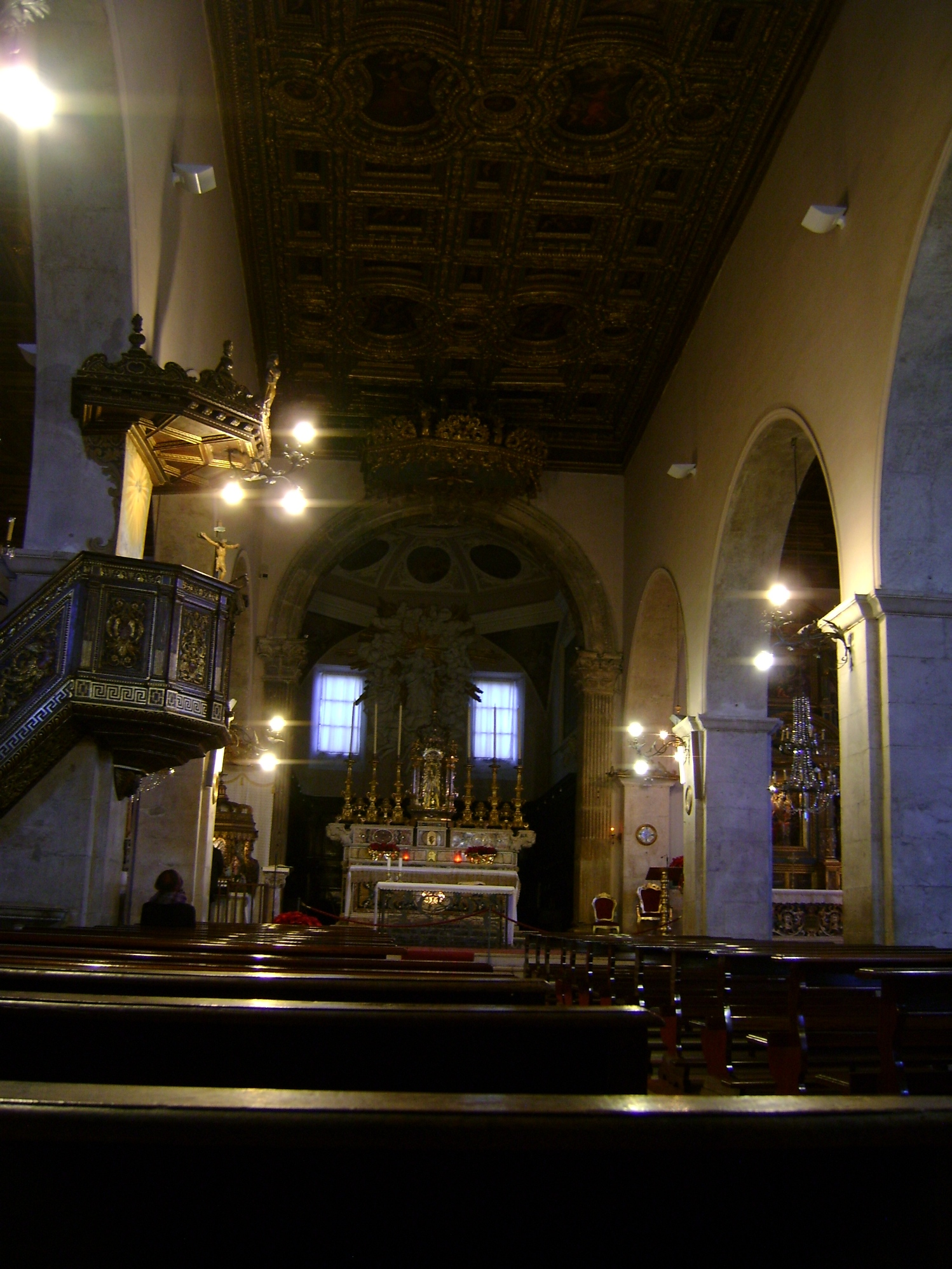
The central nave

The interior features architecture in stone, enlivened by the polychromy of the furnishings, with the carved, painted, and gilded wood of the statues (including the 13th-century Madonna del Colle), the pulpit, various altars, the choir loft (a work by Bartolomeo Balcone from Rome-Sulmona dating back to 1619), and the five coffered ceilings, mainly crafted by Carlo Sabatini of Anversa degli Abruzzi between 1670 and 1682, completed in 1742.

In marble are the antependia and the baptismal font, created by the local craftsmen Panfilo Rainaldi and Filippo Mannella. The basilica houses numerous oil paintings attributed to Tanzio da Varallo, including the notable Madonna dell'incendio sedato, as well as Giovanni Paolo Cardone and Francesco Peresi. The vault of the Chapel of the Sacrament is decorated with a fresco by the Neapolitan Giambattista Gamba. A 16th-century panel depicting the Madonna and Saints by Palma il Vecchio was stolen during the German occupation of 1943–44.

The majestic wrought iron gate, crafted by Sante di Rocco from Pescocostanzo, begun in 1699–1705 and completed in 1707 by his nephew Ilario, features figures of animals, humans, and angels. On the architrave of the craftsman's workshop, located at the foot of the staircase, is inscribed the motto ETENIM NON POTUERUNT MIHI (yet they could not defeat me). The bronze eagles of the stoups are the work of Cosimo Fanzago. The choir, the Chapel of the Sacrament, and the altar of Saint Elizabeth are adorned with stucco decorations by the Lombard craftsmen Gianni and Ferradini.

=== Exterior ===
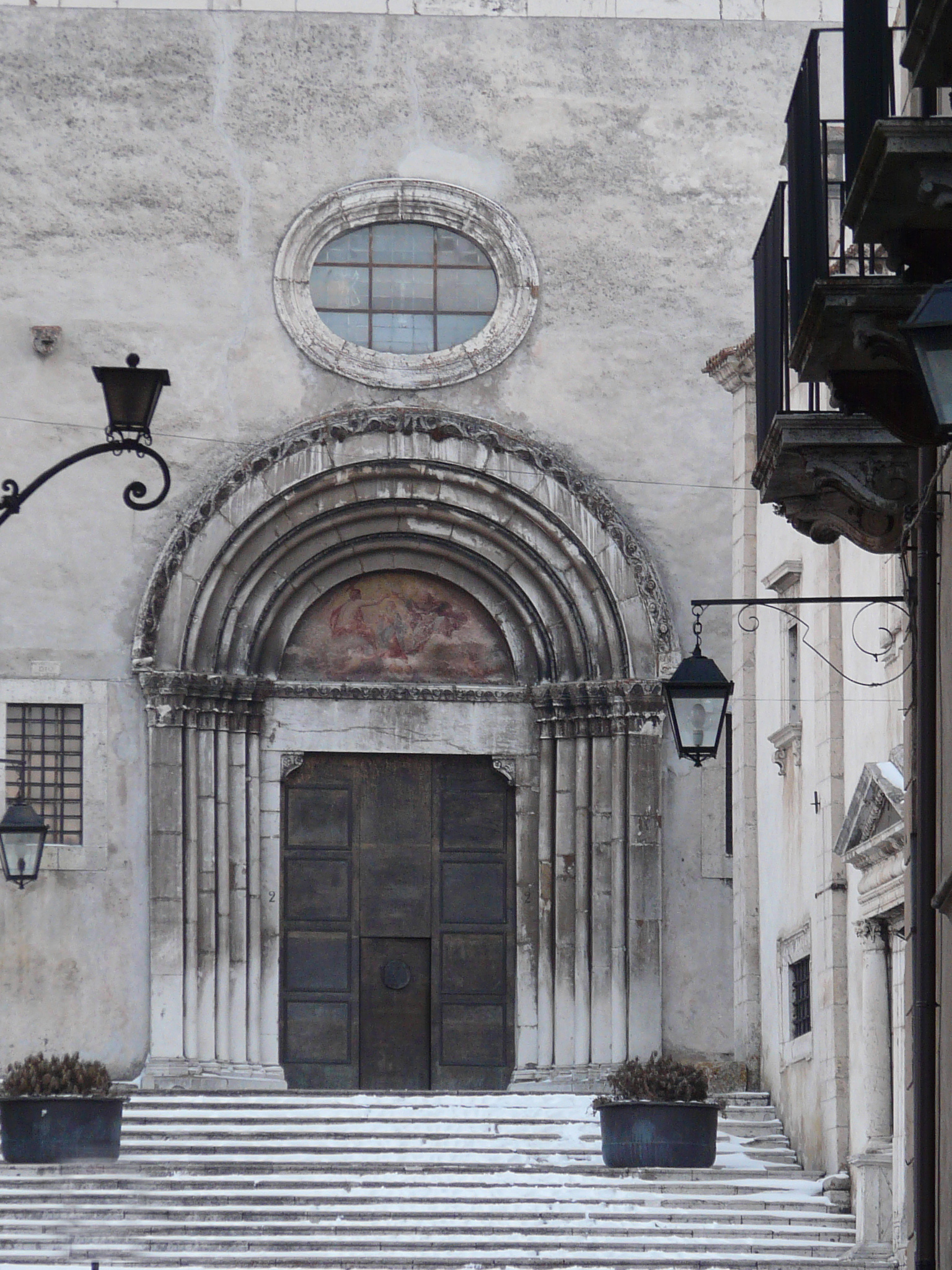
Facade facing the main street

From its elevated position, the church appears to oversee the town below through two facades. These facades follow the late Romanesque Aquilan style typical of Abruzzo, with a horizontal termination originating from the 13th and 14th centuries. They feature prominent stone pilasters at the sides, contrasting with the plastered background. The northern side facade, preceded by the staircase on the main street, has a two-tiered opening scheme, common in many churches in Pescocostanzo. This facade features a late medieval portal at the center, topped by an oval window, with two large, simple rectangular windows on either side. The portal is inspired by the main churches of L'Aquila (San Silvestro, San Pietro di Coppito, Santa Maria di Collemaggio, Santa Maria di Paganica) from the late 13th century. It consists of three orders of semicircular frames. The composition is capped by a larger, projecting frame adorned with rosettes and acanthus scrolls.

The main facade is more complex, repeating the tripartite scheme with a central portal and rose window, flanked by large rectangular windows of Renaissance character. Additionally, it features two small oval windows placed symmetrically higher than the rose window. The portal, dated 1558, is divided into two orders: the lower one has two fluted pilasters with Corinthian capitals, while the upper order has two pilasters framing an arch lunette. A high entablature caps the portal. The church has a longitudinal plan with five naves, based on Renaissance designs, incorporating Baroque interventions from the 18th century. The side bell tower is a rectangular tower, similar to the bell towers of the Church of Santa Maria della Misericordia in Pacentro and the Santissima Trinità in Popoli, and is topped with a pyramidal spire.

=== Cappellone of the Blessed Sacrament ===
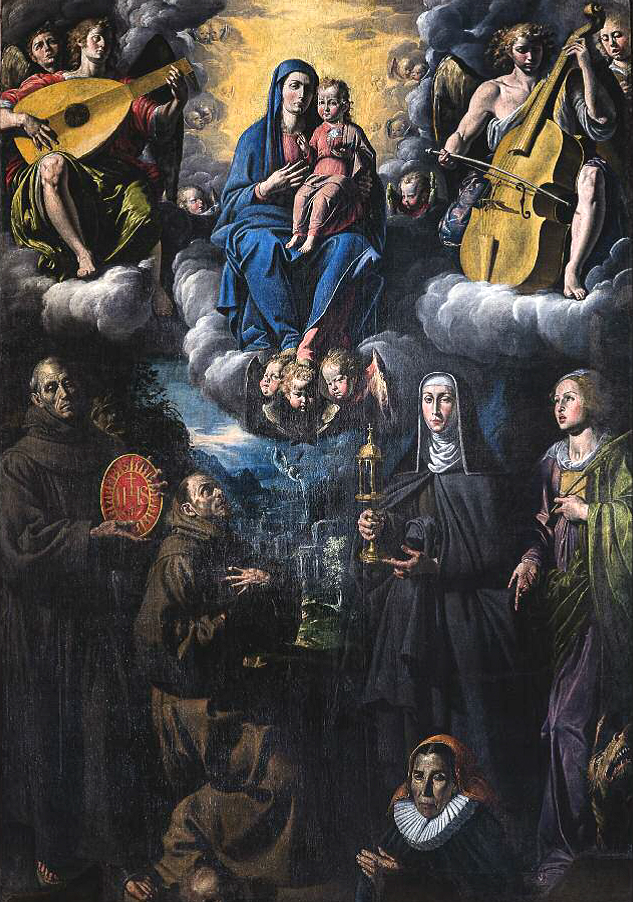
Madonna dell'incendio, work by Tanzio da Varallo

Located at the third bay near the presbytery, directly facing the side entrance, the chapel enhances the grandeur and brightness of the space. The chapel was built at the end of the 17th century and painted by Giambattista Gamba, an artist active in the early 18th century between Sulmona, Chieti, and Penne. It features a rectangular plan with rounded corners and an oval dome supported by four arches with large windows. The chapel contains three altars: one wooden and two marble.

- Altar of Santa Maria del Colle: Made of marble, it consists of a dossal created between 1568 and 1569 by Lombard masters and a mensa crafted by Pescocostanzo artisans during the 18th century. Originally part of the church's main altar, the dossal was transferred to the chapel following the relocation of the relics of San Felice da Cantalice from Rome to the collegiate church. The entire dossal is intricately carved without any unadorned surface. At the center is a bas-relief of the Assumption of the Virgin, surrounded by clouds and cherubs. The author of the marble altar is uncertain, though it is believed to be either Panfilo Ranalli or Nicodemo Mancini.
- Altar of the Holy Rosary: Created in the 16th century from wood, it is situated to the right of the entrance. It features a marble base with a wooden edicule housing a painting of the Madonna of the Rosary, created in 1580 by Paolo Cardone from L'Aquila. The chapel is richly decorated with stucco figures of Prophets and Cardinal Virtues, attributed to Gian Battista Gianni and Francesco Ferrandini, who also painted the Assumption on the apse's back wall. The ceiling decoration, by Francesco Antonio Borsillo of Larino, was refurbished in 1721 by Giambattista Gamba.

The theme depicted is "Glory in Paradise," following the architectural shape of the dome. Layers of soft clouds support spiraling rows of saints, narrowing towards the top, with the central image of the blessing Christ surrounded by angels carrying the Cross. The artist aimed to create an opening to the heavens, though the figures' sharply defined contours anchor them to the earthly realm. The chapel is enclosed by a wrought-iron gate by Norbero di Cicco, a local architect, made by blacksmith Santo di Rocco between 1699–1705 and completed in 1717 by Ilario di Rocco. It rests on a marble balustrade in the Fanzaghian style and consists of three parts divided by gilded wooden bands: the gate, the frieze, and the finial. The lower section features 33 square-section wrought-iron bars with bronze bases, capitals, and elements. The lower part of the two doors has a balustrade motif matching the marble side balustrade.

The frieze narrates horizontally: at the center, under a vine branch, a cherub lies on a cushion, embracing a puppy. On either side are symmetrical scenes with monstrous human-bust figures holding small sea monsters. Vine branches extend from their tails, with two cherubs climbing to escape two monkeys entangled in the scrolls. The finial has a triangular, symmetrical composition starting with two vases containing flowering branches. It is articulated into four orders:

- the first features a central battle between two anthropomorphic demons with legs and two lions, flanked by floral scrolls;
- the second shows two cherubs playing with two winged female figures, possibly angels;
- in the third order, two angels hold a monstrance, inviting adoration;
- at the top, the crowned monstrance triumphs.

The aim is to depict the struggle between Good and Evil and its eventual victory, symbolizing humanity's battle with sin, defeated only through the adoration of the Blessed Sacrament. The monstrance represents Divinity, the supreme Good, triumphing over evil forces with the symbolic contest of the Child, cherubs, and angels. The hard iron did not allow the realization of the soft lines or curves envisioned by the designer Santo di Rocco, resulting in a sparse and empty execution, though effective. This has led to legends, such as the Pescocostanzo blacksmiths using a special herb from the Maiella to soften the iron, and Ilario being assisted by his blind wife.

=== The Baptistery and the Pulpit ===
To the left of the internal staircase, there is a rectangular room covered by an oval dome and enclosed by a wrought iron gate created by Ilario di Rocco in 1753. The design is inspired by Rococo characteristics, giving the room an elegant and refined tone. At the center stands the baptismal font, a circular marble structure built by Filippo Mannella in 1753 using Neapolitan marble. The base, a tripod, supports a circular font adorned with colored marble inlays and winged cherubs. At the top is a polychrome wooden sculptural group depicting the Baptism of Christ. On either side of the internal staircase are two holy water stoups made in 1622. These consist of a marble basin and a bronze eagle, highlighting the contrast between different materials and the combination of natural and inanimate elements. It is believed that the designer was Cosimo Fanzago, due to the expressive naturalism, the originality of the idea, and its similarity to the pulpit of the Evangelists in the Duomo of Milan.

From the entrance, the wooden pulpit attached to one of the central nave pillars is also visible. It was crafted by Bartolomeo Balcone, a Roman who lived in Sulmona and created the choir of the Basilica of the Annunciation. The pulpit is made of walnut, with panels intricately carved and decorated with vegetal and anthropomorphic motifs, framed by Ionic pilasters. Below, a winged cherub supports the carved frames. A canopy, matching the shape of the pulpit and featuring a coffered design, covers the pulpit. At the top, a Madonna figure is prominent. Two other Baroque works are related to the pulpit.

=== The Badalone and the Choir Loft ===
The badalone is placed at the center of the choir and serves as a lectern, composed of a smooth wooden parallelepiped with rounded corners, adorned with a frieze and carved figures of telamons and caryatids at the corners. It is believed that this, too, was crafted by Balcone or one of his students. The choir loft occupies the entire back wall of the central nave. Constructed in 1612, it is an intricately carved, gilded, and colored wooden structure housing an organ with 12 registers arranged in three towers, with the central tower being taller and extending to the ceiling. The side arches are bordered by fluted and decorated semi-columns, topped with richly worked entablatures. The central arch is supported by a wooden structure flanked by lateral volutes and culminating in a broken circular pediment.

The organ balcony shares strong similarities with the pulpit and badalone, suggesting that it was also created by Balcone. The choir loft is divided into six symmetrical panels, with a central wooden display replicating a miniature organ carved in wood. The panels are separated by figures of telamons and caryatids, supporting a frieze with vegetal motifs. Inside, anthropomorphic figures from which vines extend are featured. The motifs are the same as those on the pulpit and badalone; however, the choir loft contrasts the rigidity and composure of the pulpit with a freer style and richer composition due to the use of beads, dentils, and ovolos.

=== The Ceilings ===
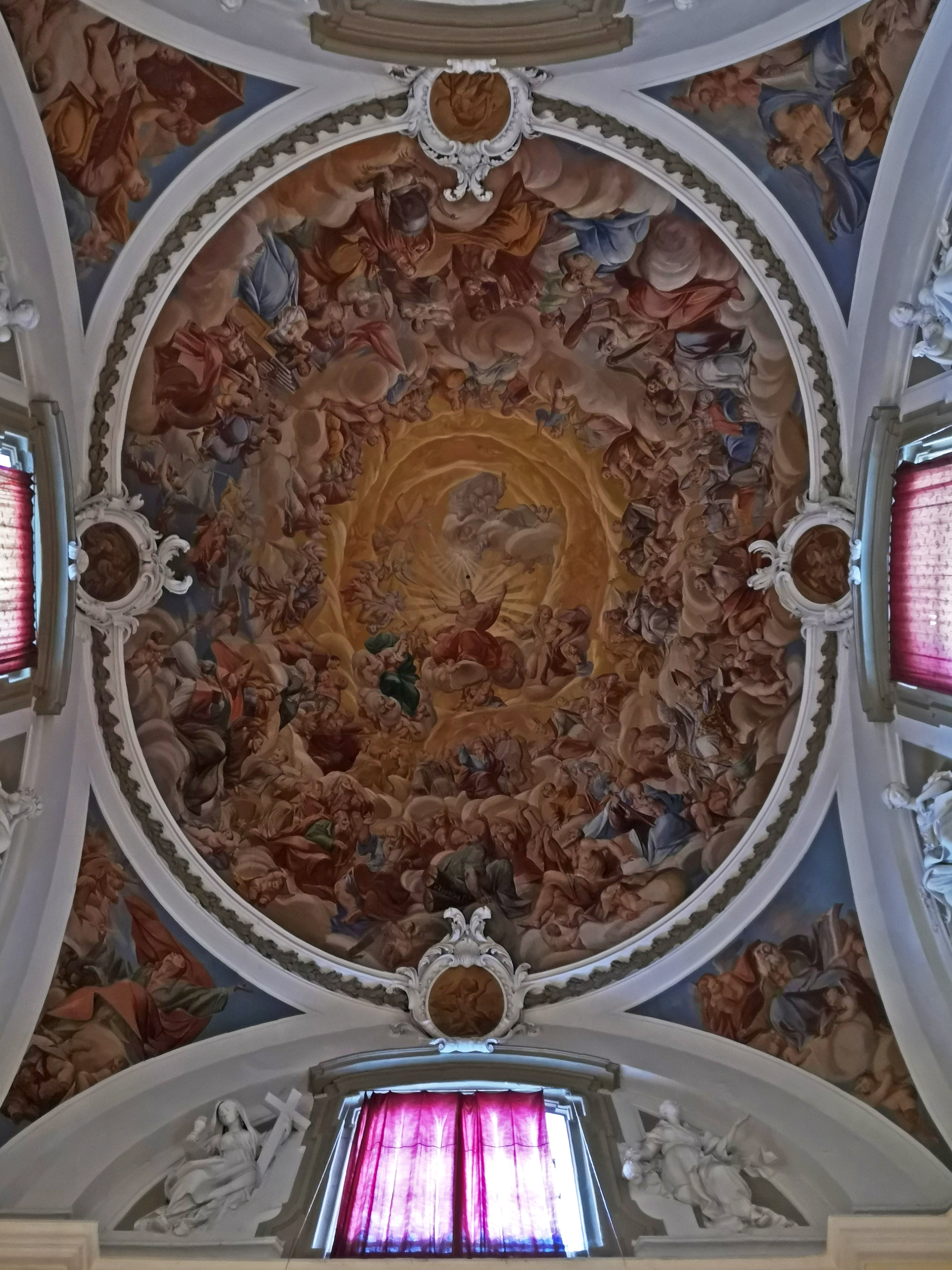
Cappellone del Santissimo Sacramento, fresco of the Assumption of Mary Queen of Heaven, by Giambattista Gamba

The most ornate ceiling is that of the central nave, created between 1670 and 1682 and designed by Carlo Sabatini. The gilding was done by the brothers Gioacchino and Giuseppe Petti of Oratino, while the oils belong to Giovannangelo Bucci. Architect Sabatini shows Neapolitan influences: the structure consists of intricately carved, lacquered, and gilded wood, divided into coffers. There are 85 coffers of various shapes—round, rectangular, and mixtilinear—designed to contain the paintings by Bucci. The frames that enclose these spaces are richly worked with ovolos and leaves. Eight large mixtilinear coffers, arranged transversely in four pairs, break the sequence of the rectangular panels.

The deep coffers create the impression that the paintings recede, and the choice of sky blue for the background color suggests an opening to the heavens. Red is also prominent, and the paintings depict joyful angels singing, playing music, and scattering flowers, giving the ceiling a heavenly appearance. It closely resembles the ceiling of the Chapel of the Holy Rosary in the Church of San Domenico in Penne, as well as the ceiling of the Basilica of San Bernardino in L'Aquila. The ceilings of the adjacent side naves were begun in the same year but completed in 1742, following Sabatini's design.

They share the same layout as the central ceiling, with a succession of coffers framed by cornices containing painted panels with vegetal and zoomorphic motifs. The continuity is interrupted by four large rectangular panels arranged lengthwise, housing oil paintings on canvas depicting biblical scenes. The ceilings of the other two outer naves show significant differences and appear to have been completed later, although documents indicate they existed by 1697. The left ceiling resembles the central one, suggesting it was created by Sabatini's school, while the other is more disorganized, with large, undecorated wooden compartments and canvases attributed to Remigio Sabatini (1718).

An octagonal dome defines the composition, featuring frescoes attributed to Giambattista Gamba, who also created the frescoes of the Cappellone. The paintings on the vault are arranged within variously shaped spaces—round, oval, mixtilinear—depicting the Scenes of the Life of the Virgin. At the center, in a space reflecting the octagon of the dome, is the Assumption of the Virgin into Heaven among angels. The stucco decoration was created by Giambattista Gianni and Francesco Ferrandini.

=== The Altars of the Basilica ===
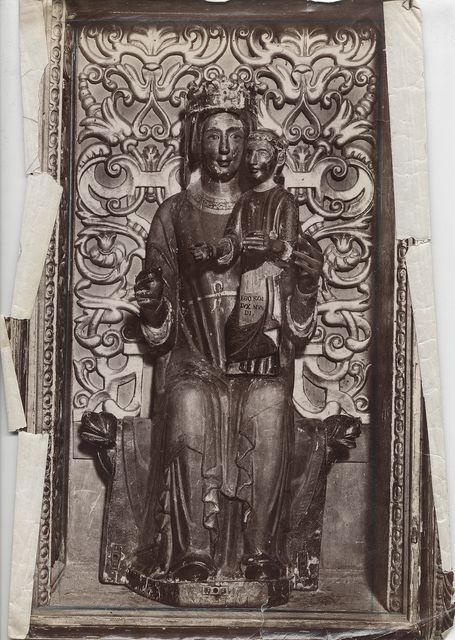
Historical photograph of the statue of Santa Maria del Colle, before restoration

Along the right nave are the altars of the Madonna of Loreto, Saint Paul, Saint Anne, and the Madonna of Pompeii (18th century). The most distinctive element is the antependium, which encapsulates much of their richness: in the altar of Saint Paul, the antependium has been replaced by a marble ark. Particularly refined is the antependium of Saint Anne, with light-colored vegetal motifs against a dark background. The antependium of the Madonna of Pompeii altar was created by Ranalli in 1717 and appears to model the work of Norberto di Cicco, specifically the altar of Saint Anthony in the Church of Jesus and Mary, also in Pescocostanzo.

Against the dark background, scrolls enriched with beads intertwine on the sides. At the center, a stucco frame encloses a geometric design. The high altar of the Madonna del Colle is located at the end of the side nave, from the 17th century; the antependium is by Ranalli, and the dossal is a 17th-century work by Palmerio Grasso. The intricate and gilded wooden structure is notable, with two recognizable parts. The lower section, which stands out for its extensive gilding, forms a central aedicule enclosed by a curved and broken pediment. Inside the aedicule is the rectangular niche intended to house the Madonna del Colle (12th century); the upper part features an aedicule with a triangular pediment, connected to the lower part by two enormous lateral volutes.

The main altar dedicated to Saint Felix of Cantalice was created by Giuseppe Cicco in 1668. The marble antependium features symmetrical vegetal decorations around the central opening, which houses relics, framed by a cherubic border. The upper part comprises a low altar piece, defined at the top by a cornice and at the sides by two cherub heads, a motif typical of Fanzago.

To the left of the high altar is that of the Holy Trinity, resembling that of Saint Anne's altar; in the right nave, there is the altar of the Crucifix by Ranalli (1738–39). The lower part is a composite structure reflecting Roman Baroque, while the upper part has Neapolitan reminiscences. At the center is the Crucifix within a concave space, with statues of Saint Blaise and Saint Barbara on either side. The interplay of concave niches' voids and solids seems reminiscent of Borromini's characteristics.

On the counter-facade of the right nave is the altar of Saint Catherine with a painting by Tanzio da Varallo; there are also two other altars dedicated to Saint Rita and Saint Peter, the latter reflecting the Mannerist style of 17th-century Pescocostanzo. The upper part consists of three separate aedicules, with the central one being larger and set back compared to the two lateral ones. These are enclosed by curved pediments and contain paintings: Tanzio da Varallo's canvas of the Madonna of the Quenched Fire, referring to an actual event in the town.

Remember the importance of the 12th-century votive statue of the Madonna del Colle, one of the oldest wooden statues in Abruzzo. It has been repainted multiple times to improve preservation, but the Byzantine-Romanesque style is still evident: the Virgin is seated on a throne, adorned in oriental drapery, crowned as the Queen of Heaven, with a fixed gaze and slight smile. She holds the Child, who is also depicted with a stylized smile and fixed, expressionless gaze, with exaggeratedly elongated arms, in a blessing gesture.

== Chapel of the Suffrage of the Dead ==
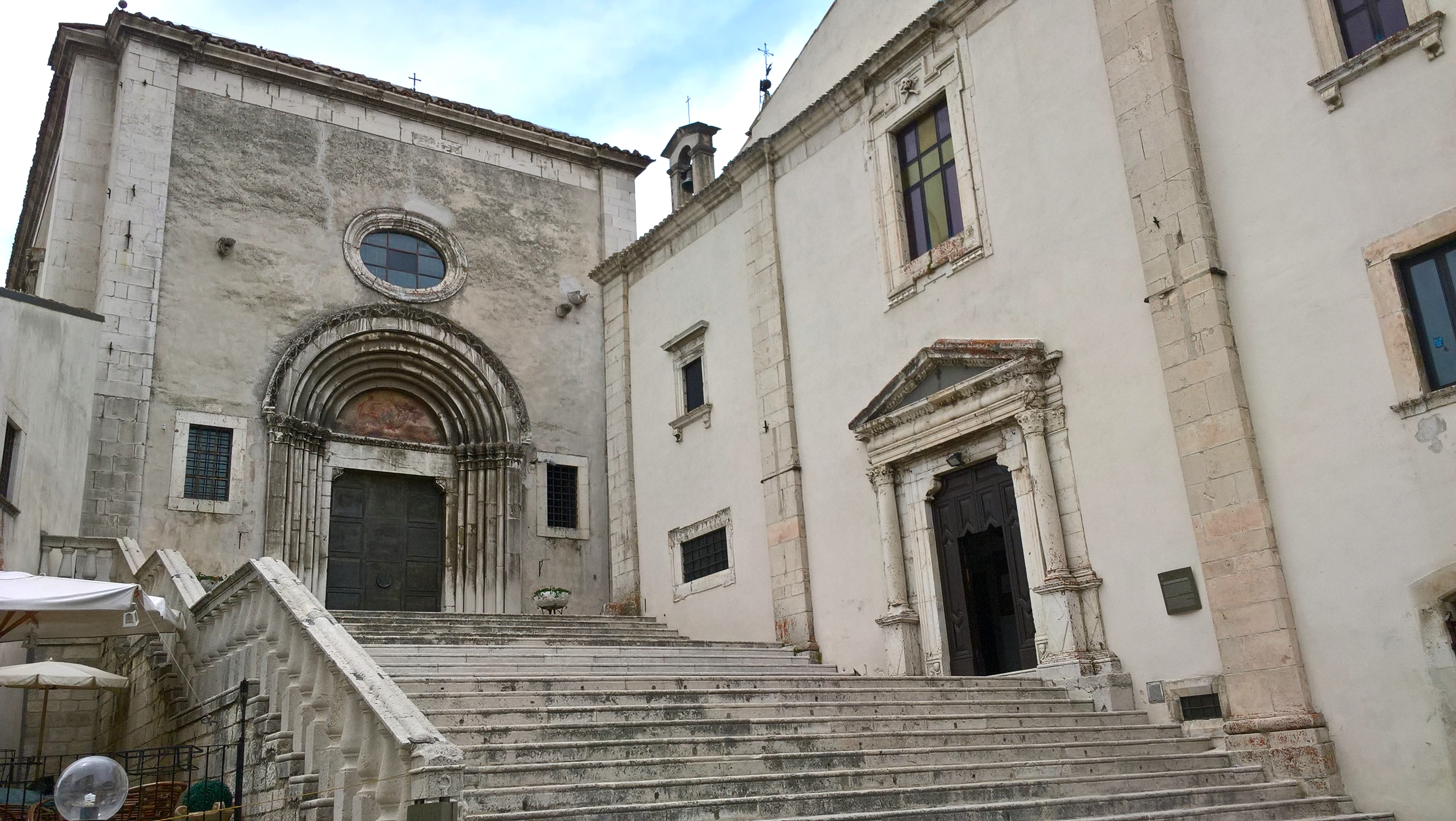
View of the left entrance to the basilica, and to the right, the Chapel of the Suffrage of the Dead

Adjacent to the Collegiate Church, it dates back to the 16th century, featuring a horizontally terminated facade, reproducing a type very common in Abruzzo. The facade is divided into three parts by flat stone pilasters, balancing the relationship between the limited height and width. At the center, a large rectangular window is above the portal, with other rectangular windows arranged in two orders. The 17th-century portal stands out, with a triangular pediment supported by columns on high bases, decorated with Baroque-style skulls flanked from behind. Inside, there is a fine and sumptuous walnut altar carved by Palmerio Grasso between 1647 and 1649, completed by Ferdinando Mosca in 1716; the wooden coffered ceiling was made between 1637 and 1639 by Pescocostanzans Bernardino D'Alessandro and Falconio Falconi, with paintings on canvas done between 1640 and 1657. Also of great interest are the two torch holders on either side of the altar, in carved and gilded wood by Rocco Falconio (1693).

== Curiosities ==
Baptism ceremonies are celebrated according to the Ambrosian Rite, brought by Lombard craftsmen who immigrated to Pescocostanzo in the 15th and 17th centuries. A scene with Nino Manfredi from the film Straziami ma di baci saziami (1968) was shot on the staircase outside the basilica.

== Bibliography ==
- Sabatini, Francesco; Ghisetti Giavarina, Adriano; Casale, Vittorio (2015). Vittorini, Marta; Colangelo, Anna; Conte, Floriana (eds.). La basilica di Santa Maria del Colle a Pescocostanzo. Ortona: Edizioni Menabo. ISBN 978-88-95535-63-0.
