= San Michele Arcangelo, Montasola =

Roman Catholic сhurch in Montasola, Italy

Coordinates: 42°23′10.3″N 12°40′50.4″E

San Michele Arcangelo is the Roman Catholic church in town of Montasola, in the province of Rieti, region of Lazio, Italy. It is adjacent to the oratory of Opera Pia Cimini.

== History ==
A church at the site was likely present from early medieval times, and during some decades of the 20th-century, it shared parish functions with Santi Pietro e Tommaso. It was however for many years in ruins. Restoration took place in the 19th century, under local patronage of persons emigrating from the town. The interior has a single nave and has an original pavement. The church has three altars. The main altarpiece depicts the Virgin. On the right, the altar is dedicated to St Anne, while on the left to Mary Magdalen. The marble holy water font is ancient, and has Romanesque artwork.

The adjacent baroque oratory was endowed in 1712 by Francesco Cimini, and was once attached to a hospital. It is said that Cimini discovered by chance a treasure of gold in his bakery in Rome, and this allowed him to endow this oratory. The interior is rich in polychrome marble and has a painting depicting the Holy Conception attributed to the school of Antonio Gherardi. The wooden cruxifix is of high quality. The marble putti of the balustrade are attributed to followers of Bernini. The balustrade was derived from the church of Santa Maria Murella.
