= Sant'Antonio, Contigliano =

Building in Contigliano, Italy

Coordinates: 42°24′31.4″N 12°45′53.4″E

Sant’Antonio da Padova (Italian: St Antony of Padua) is a small Roman Catholic Church, located at Piazza Sant'Antonio just outside what were the medieval walls of the town of Contigliano, in the province of Rieti, region of Lazio, Italy.

== History ==
The present church was built in 1734. The exterior has a subdued stucco decoration, including garlands in the triangular tympanum. The interior is highly decorated with white marble and gilded stucco. The ceiling is frescoed with trompe-l’oeil architecture, and grotteschi. The main altarpiece depicts St Antony praying to the child Jesus, painted by Girolamo Troppa. The Confraternity of Sant’Antonio is located adjacent to the church.
