= Casperia =

- Comune
- Comune di Casperia
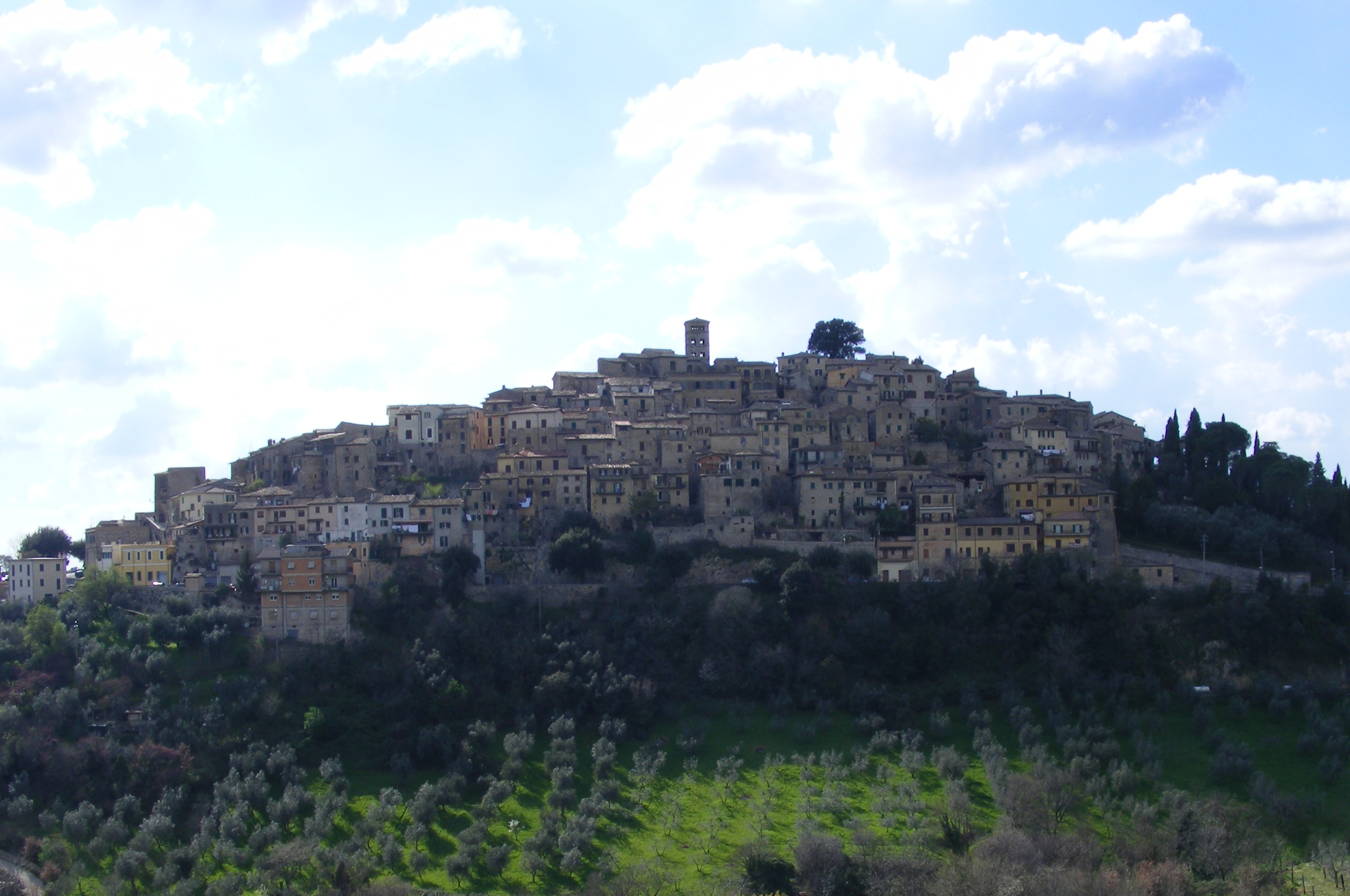
- View of Casperia

- Coat of arms

- Location within Italy Location within Lazio
- Coordinates: 42°20′N 12°40′E
- Country: Italy
- Region: Lazio
- Province: Province of Rieti (RI)
- Frazioni: Santa Maria in Legarano, San Vito di Casperia, Paranzano

Area
  - Total: 25.4 km^{2} (9.8 sq mi)
- Elevation: 397 m (1,302 ft)

Population (December 2004)
  - Total: 1,164
  - Density: 45.8/km^{2} (119/sq mi)
- Demonym: Casperiani o aspresi
- Time zone: UTC+1 (CET)
  - Summer (DST): UTC+2 (CEST)
- Postal code: 02041
- Dialing code: 0765
- Website: www.comunedicasperia.it

Casperia is a comune (municipality) in the Province of Rieti in the Italian region of Latium, located about 50 kilometres (31 mi) northeast of Rome and about 20 kilometres (12 mi) southwest of Rieti. As of 31 December 2004, it had a population of 1,164 and an area of 25.4 square kilometres (9.8 sq mi).

The municipality of Casperia contains the frazioni (subdivisions, mainly villages and hamlets) Santa Maria in Legarano, San Vito di Casperia, and Paranzano.

Casperia borders the following municipalities: Cantalupo in Sabina, Contigliano, Montasola, Rieti, Roccantica, Torri in Sabina.

Among the church buildings are the Santissima Annunziata, San Giovanni Battista, Santa Maria in Legarano, Madonna della Neve, San Vito Martire, and the church and convent of San Salvatore.

== Demographic evolution ==
Historical population

Year	Pop.	±%
1861	1,376	—
1871	1,386	+0.7%
1881	1,436	+3.6%
1901	1,680	+17.0%
1911	1,602	−4.6%

Year	Pop.	±%
1921	1,720	+7.4%
1931	1,665	−3.2%
1936	1,722	+3.4%
1951	1,639	−4.8%
1961	1,352	−17.5%

Year	Pop.	±%
1971	1,145	−15.3%
1981	1,035	−9.6%
1991	1,032	−0.3%
2001	1,081	+4.7%

Source: Data from ISTAT
