= Montasola =

- Comune
- Comune di Montasola
- Location within Italy Location within Lazio
- Coordinates: 42°23′N 12°41′E
- Country: Italy
- Region: Lazio
- Province: Rieti (RI)

Government
  - Mayor: Vincenzo Leti

Area
  - Total: 12.6 km^{2} (4.9 sq mi)
- Elevation: 604 m (1,982 ft)

Population (31 December 2010)
  - Total: 420
  - Density: 33/km^{2} (86/sq mi)
- Demonym: Montasolini
- Time zone: UTC+1 (CET)
  - Summer (DST): UTC+2 (CEST)
- Postal code: 02040
- Dialing code: 0746
- Website: Official website

Montasola is a comune (municipality) in the Province of Rieti in the Italian region of Latium, located about 60 kilometres (37 mi) northeast of Rome and about 15 kilometres (9 mi) west of Rieti.

Montasola borders the following municipalities: Casperia, Contigliano, Cottanello, Torri in Sabina, Vacone.

Among the churches in the town are: Santa Maria Murella, Santi Pietro e Tommaso, and San Michele Arcangelo.

== Santa Maria Murella ==
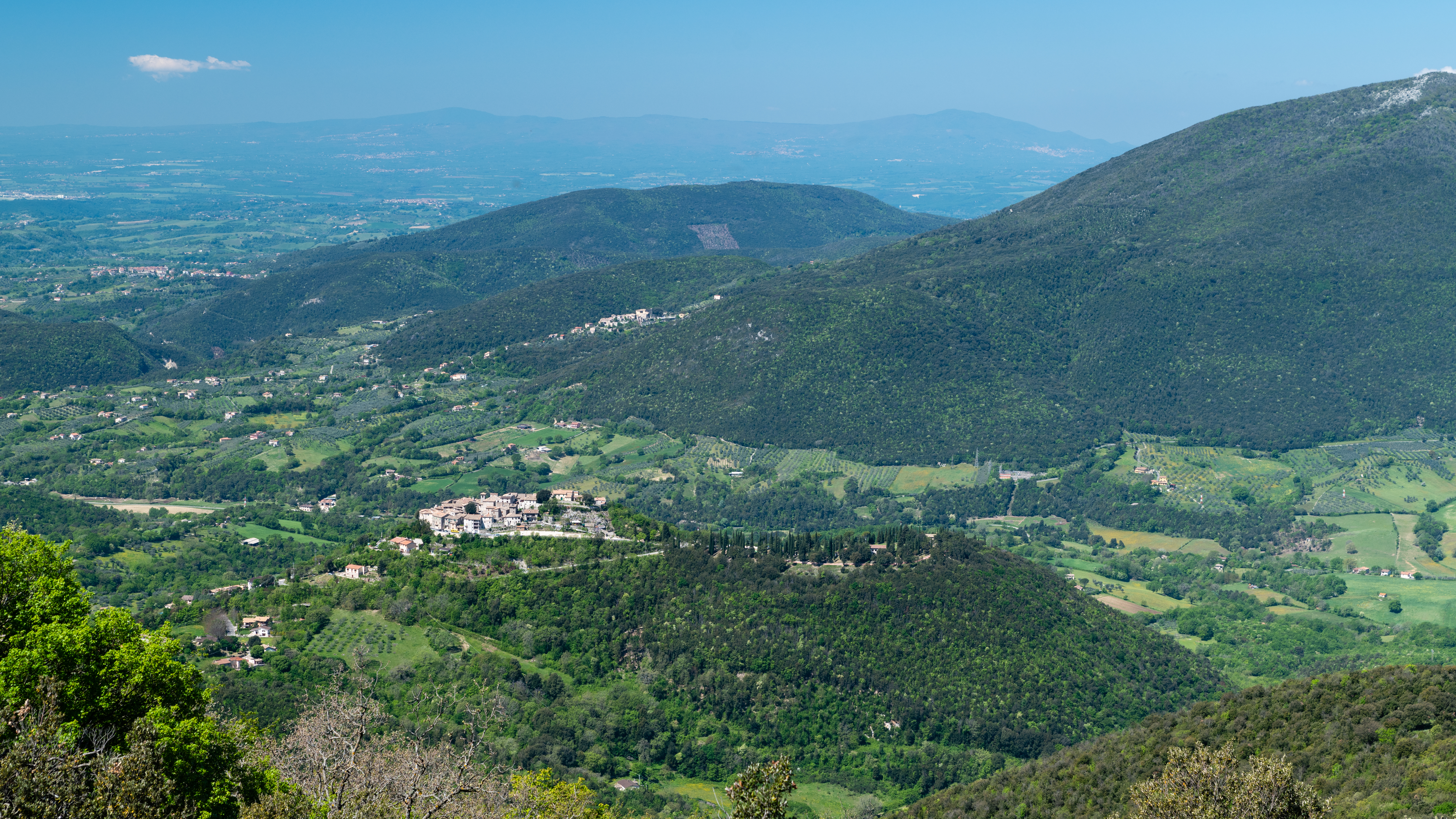
Montasola, Latium, Italy

Santa Maria Murella is a Roman Catholic church located just outside of Montasola. The church was built using Ancient Roman ruins, and was located at the site of the Roman city of Laurum. The name Murella derives from the former Roman walls from which the stones for the church were derived. It is suspected that the site once housed a pagan temple. The first construction was likely in the 12th-century, although inscription on the facade date to the 14th-century; the building served as parish church a that time. The facade has some Romanesque sculpted carving in bas-relief. Flanking the mullioned window in the facade are two lions, with an eagle above.

A major restoration was pursued in 1693, patronized by Angelo Bonelli. Many of the canvases from this time have been moved to the present parish church of Santi Pietro e Tommaso. A number of burials occurred in the walls of the church. The church property is still used for burials.
