= Contigliano =

- Comune
- Comune di Contigliano
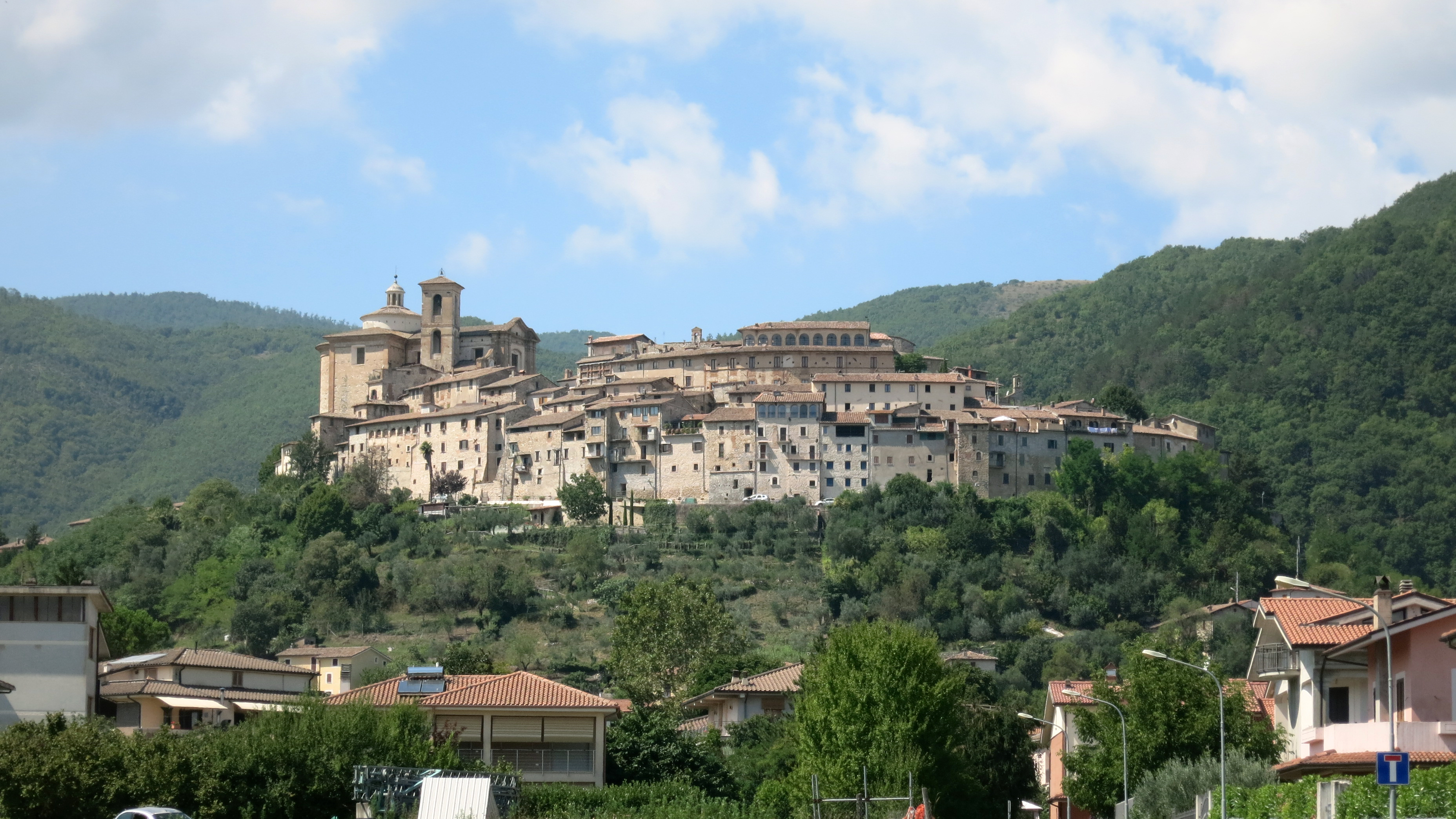
- View of Contigliano

- Location within Italy Location within Lazio
- Coordinates: 42°25′N 12°46′E
- Country: Italy
- Region: Lazio
- Province: Rieti (RI)

Government
  - Mayor: Angelo Toni

Area
  - Total: 53.5 km^{2} (20.7 sq mi)
- Elevation: 488 m (1,601 ft)

Population (30 June 2017)
  - Total: 3,833
  - Density: 71.6/km^{2} (186/sq mi)
- Demonym: Contiglianesi
- Time zone: UTC+1 (CET)
  - Summer (DST): UTC+2 (CEST)
- Postal code: 02043
- Dialing code: 0746
- Website: Official website

Contigliano is a comune (municipality) in the Province of Rieti in the Italian region of Lazio, located about 60 kilometres (37 mi) northeast of Rome and about 8 kilometres (5 mi) west of Rieti.

Contigliano borders the following municipalities: Casperia, Colli sul Velino, Cottanello, Greccio, Montasola, Rieti.

The most important church in town is the church of San Michele Arcangelo. Among the other churches, is the church of Sant'Antonio, San Lorenzo, and the Abbey of San Pastore.

== Transport ==
Contigliano has a station on the Terni–Sulmona railway, with trains to Terni, Rieti and L'Aquila.

== See also ==
- Abbey of San Pastore

This link includes genealogical information about some of the families of Contigliano.

- https://www.castelnuovodiportogenealogy.com/
