= Santa Maria in Legarano =

Church in Legarano, Italy

Santa Maria in Legarano is a Roman Catholic church, located in the frazione of Legarano north of the town of Casperia, in the province of Rieti, region of Lazio, Italy. The church is dedicated to the Birth of the Virgin.

== History ==
The church was built in early medieval centuries at the site of a rustic Ancient Roman villa. It remained a parish church until 1409, when it was made part of a Gesuati Convent. The entrance to the church is striking because it is approached by a long external stone staircase rising to a 16th-century sculpted portal in a wall. From there, a narrow passage between tall bushes lead to the facade portico. Inside the portico, in the lunette above the entrance, is a fresco of the Annuciation (1561) completed by the brothers Lorenzo and Bartolomeo Torresani.

The church has a single nave. In the left apse is a fresco depicting the Marriage of the Virgin attributed to Alessandro Torresani, son of Lorenzo. In the left transept are 16th-century terracotta statues depicting Mary and Joseph and a nativity scene (presepe). In the chapel on the left, on the right, is a fresco depicting the Last Judgement by the Torresani brothers.

In the central apse is a polychrome statue of the Madonna and Child (1489), signed by Carlo l'Aquilano. The 15th-century frescoes depict the Madonna and Child and on the ceiling, Christ in a Mandorla.

In the right apse is a 15th-century polychrome crucifix. Two paintings depict Saint John the Baptist and St Sebastian, painted by followers of Antoniazzo Romano, they are painted on a reliquary built into the wall.

The Gesuati order was suppressed in 1668, and the convent was closed.
