= Santissima Annunziata, Casperia =

Church building in Casperia, Italy

Coordinates: 42°20′12″N 12°40′12″E

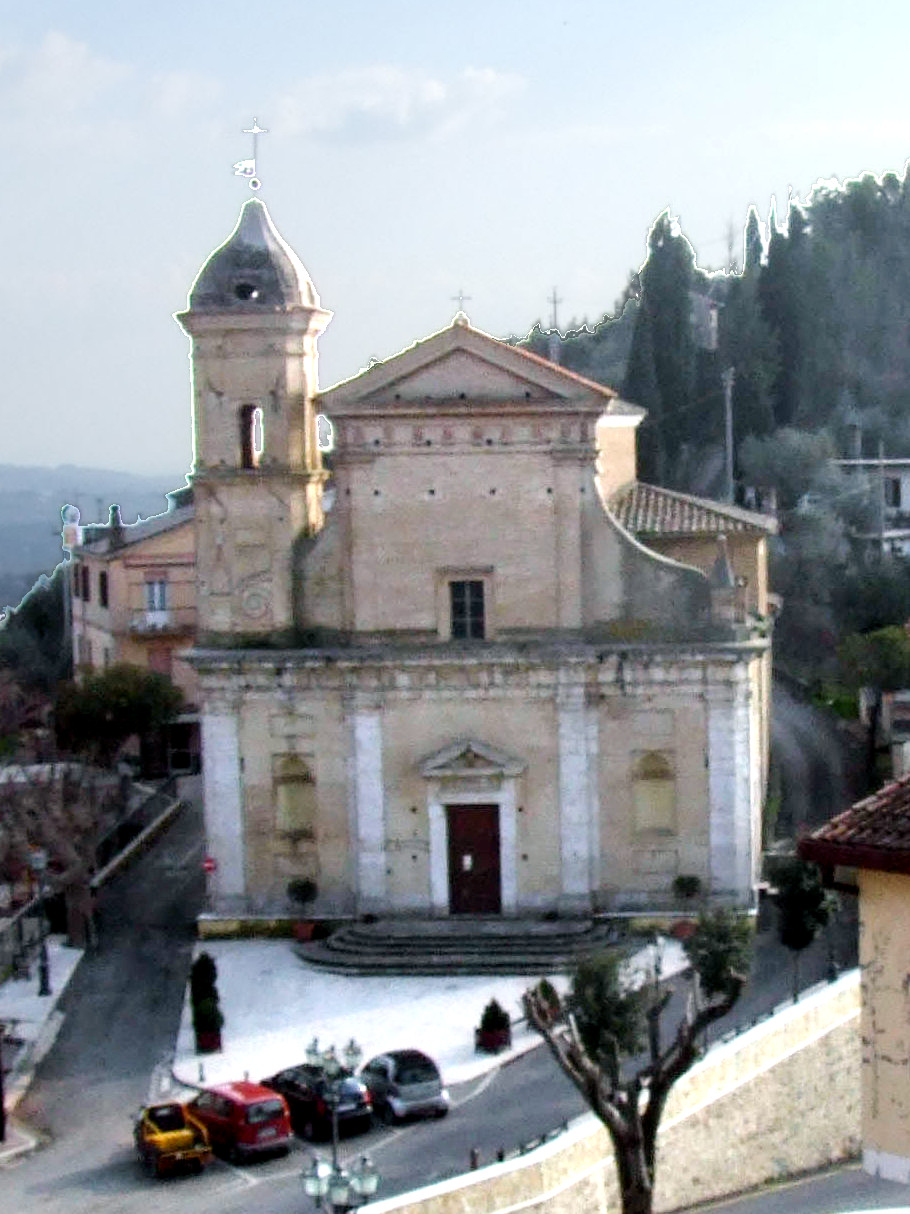

The church of the Santissima Annunziata is a baroque-style, Roman Catholic church located on piazzale Oddo Valeriani in the town of Casperia, in the province of Rieti, region of Lazio, Italy.

== History ==
Construction of the present church, at the site of an earlier structure, began in 1609 and was not completed until 1661, under the patronage of Girolamo Saraceni. The interior has four altars. The main altarpiece is a masterwork of the painter Giovanni Battista Salvi, called Sassoferrato, and depicting The Annunciation. It is flanked by two columns of the rose-colored marble of Cottanello. The Chapel of St Francis Xavier, erected by the Senapi family, has a 17th-century canvas depicting the Circumcision of Jesus.
