= Hermitage of Saint Anthony =

Hermitage in Pescocostanzo, Italy

- Eremo di Sant'Antonio
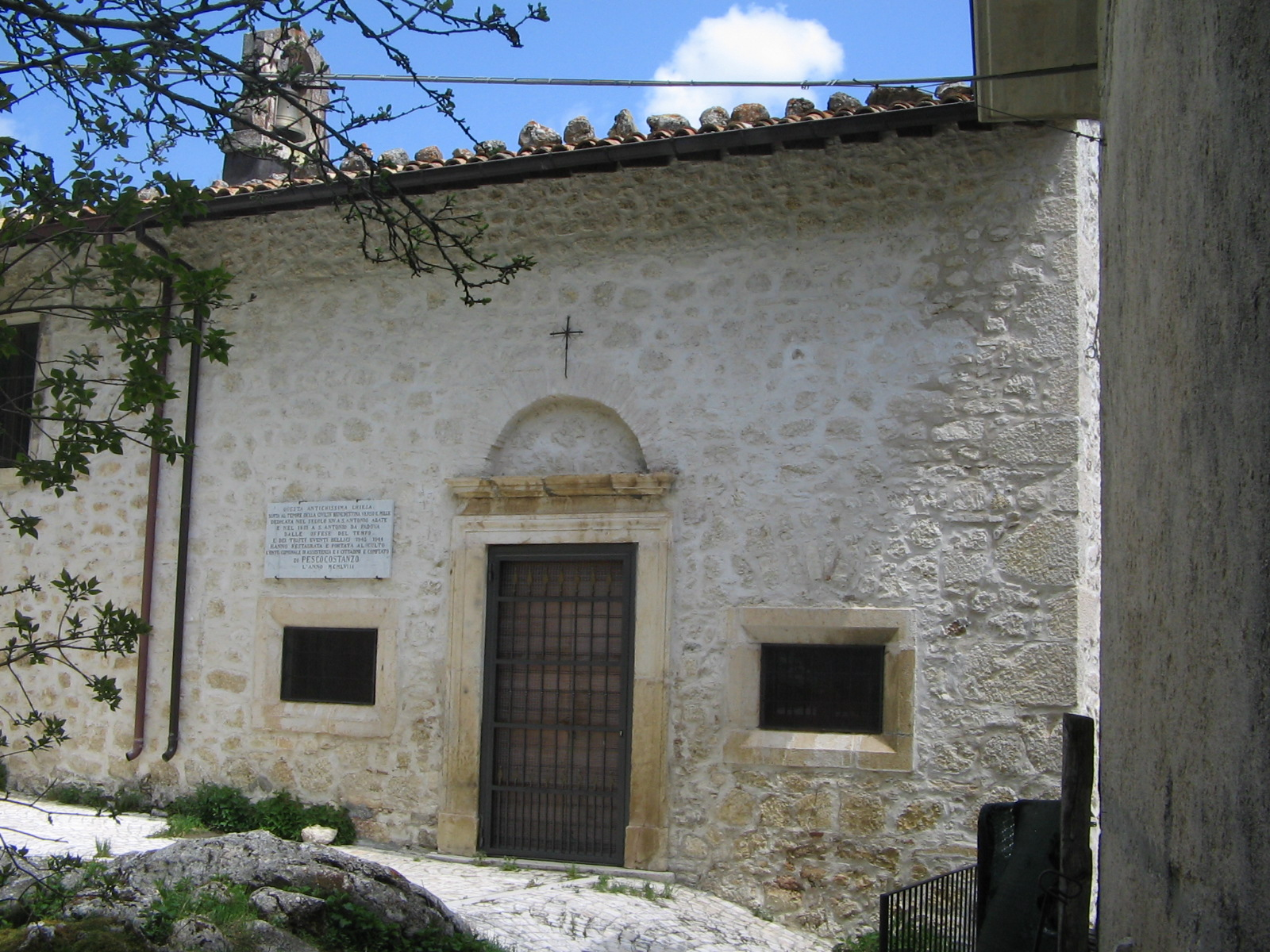
- View of the hermitage

- Location within Abruzzo

Religion
- Affiliation: Roman Catholic
- Province: Province of L'Aquila
- Region: Abruzzo

Location
- Municipality: Pescocostanzo
- State: Italy
- Interactive map of Hermitage of Saint Anthony
- Coordinates: 41.946686°N 14.031164°E

Architecture
- Completed: 12th-century

Eremo di Sant'Antonio (Italian for Hermitage of Saint Anthony) is an hermitage located in Pescocostanzo, Province of L'Aquila (Abruzzo, Italy).

== History ==
The Hermitage of Sant'Antonio was built within the "Bosco di Sant'Antonio" towards the end of the 14th century, with construction completed in the early 15th century, as indicated by some external and internal decorative elements of the building. The hermitage was first documented in a papal bull from 1536. Like the surrounding forest, it was initially consecrated to Jupiter during the pagan era and, following the conversion to Catholicism during the Middle Ages, was later dedicated first to Saint Anthony the Abbot and then to Saint Anthony of Padua. In 1577, it underwent its first restoration, carried out by the peasants of the nearby town of Pescocostanzo, as evidenced by the inscription on the architrave of the building's main facade.

== Architecture ==
Externally, the hermitage comprises a church and some residential buildings arranged on two levels. The main facade features a portal with an adjoining architrave, above which a plaque commemorates the 1577 restoration and a series of four 13th-14th century windows in grey stone. The entire complex is covered by a continuous gable roof from which a bell gable emerges. Inside, there is an altar with a late-14th century wooden statue of Saint Anthony the Abbot and a painting of Saint Anthony of Padua; the entire space also leads to a small sacristy.
