= San Michele Arcangelo, Contigliano =

Church building in Contigliano, Italy

Coordinates: 42°24′32.8″N 12°45′57.5″E

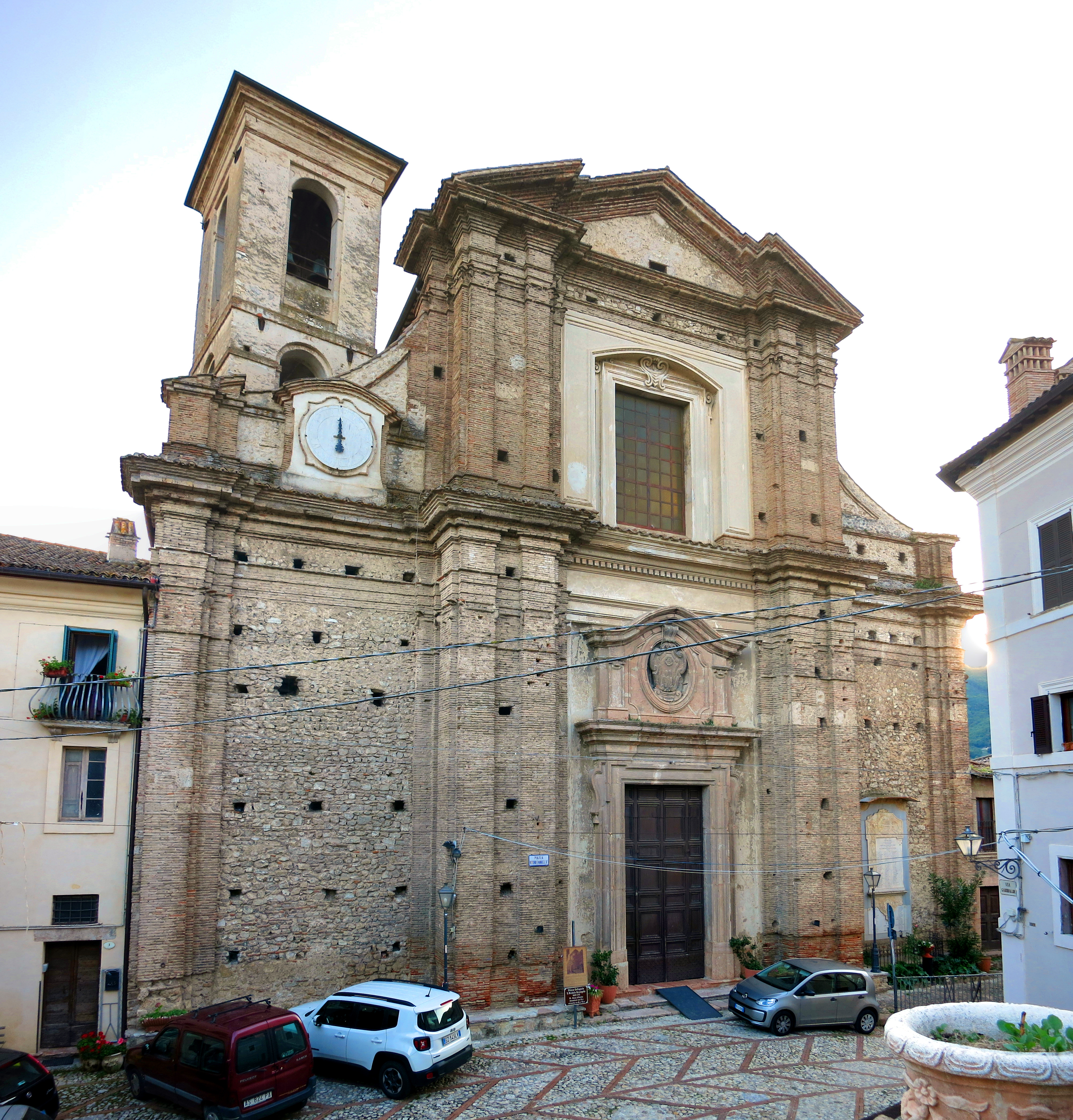
Facade

San Michele Arcangelo (Italian: St Michael the Archangel) is a Baroque-style, Roman Catholic church located on Via Cavour in the town of Contigliano, in the province of Rieti, region of Lazio, Italy.

== History ==
The present church was begun in 1683, dedicated to St Michael Archangel, and replacing an older church of the same name. Saint Michael, considered a patron of high places and warriors, was particularly favored by Lombards. This church soon gained the title of Collegiate Church, allowing it to train priests. The consecration of the 1683 church was by the bishop of Rieti Monsignor Ippolito Vicentini (1671-1701). Another reconstruction and reconsecration took place in 1747 by the bishop Antonino Serafino Camarda (1724-1754). The facade presently faces North-East.

The interior has rich stucco decoration, including for capitals of the pilasters. At the apse, the walls have polychrome marble and gilded capitals. The main altarpiece depicts St Michael Archangel vanquishing Satan painted by Filippo Zucchetti. The main altar is surrounded by wooden choir stalls, completed in the 18th century by Venanzio di Nunzio of Pescocostanzo.

Among the side altarpieces in chapels are a Miracle of St Vincent Ferrer, by Onofrio Avellino. The background in this painting is a view of the town in 1707. Other paintings include a St Jerome in the Desert by a follower of Caravaggio; a St Antony of Padua' by Pasqualino da Casperia. The church organ dates from the 18th century and was completed in 1748 by Adriano and Ranuzio Fedeli.
