= Hermitage of San Michele Arcangelo, Pescocostanzo =

Hermitage in L'Aquila, Italy

Coordinates: 41.9105°N 14.0628°E

Hermitage of San Michele Arcangelo
- Eremo di San Michele Arcangelo
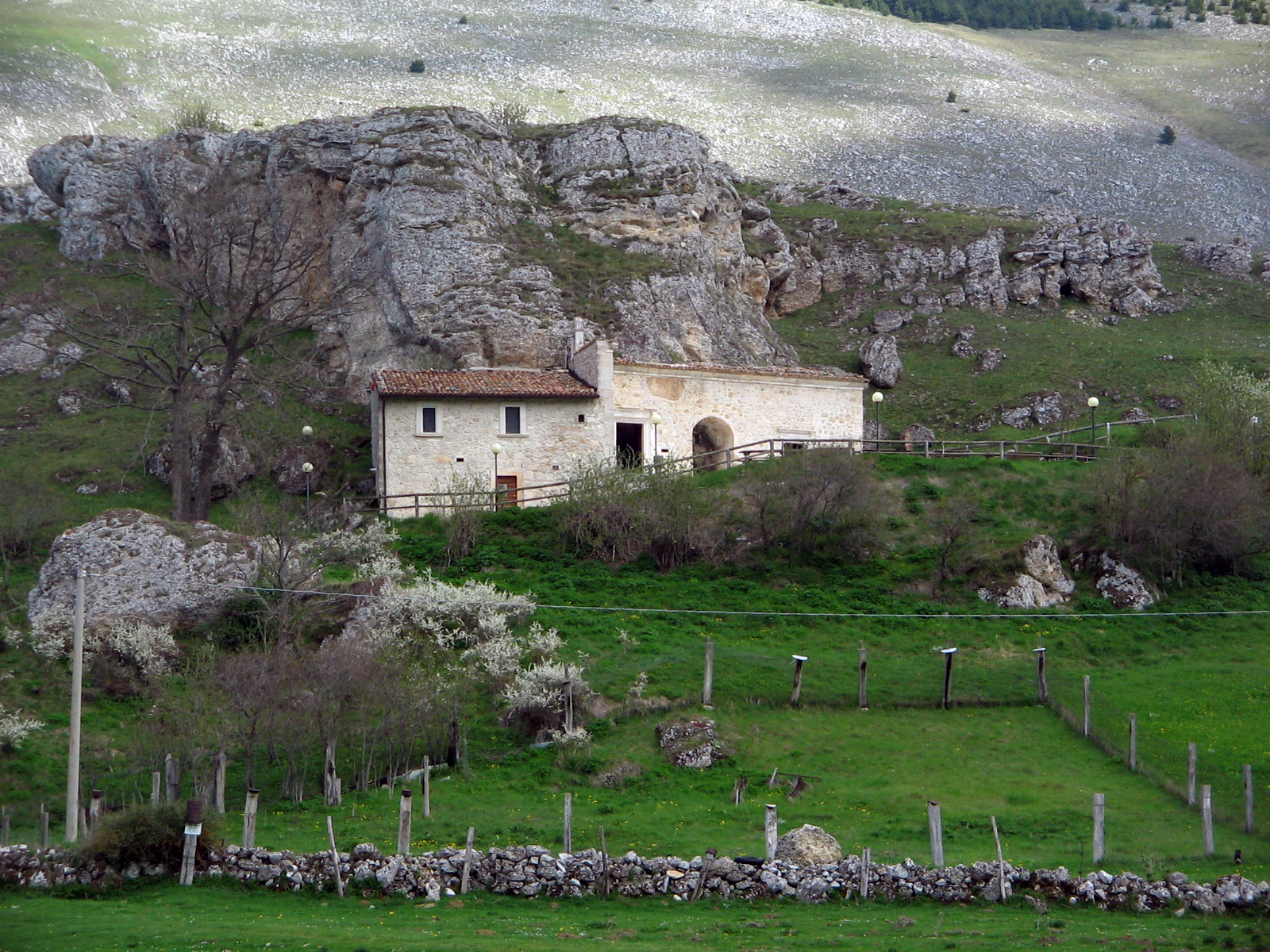
- View of the hermitage

- Location within Abruzzo

Religion
- Affiliation: Roman Catholic
- Province: Province of L'Aquila
- Region: Abruzzo

Location
- Municipality: Pescocostanzo
- State: Italy
- Interactive map of Hermitage of San Michele Arcangelo

Architecture
- Completed: 12th-century

Eremo di San Michele Arcangelo (Italian for Hermitage of San Michele Arcangelo) is an hermitage located in Pescocostanzo, Province of L'Aquila (Abruzzo, Italy).

== History ==
Located on the slopes of Monte Pizzalto, along the Quarto Grande Plateau, at an altitude of 1266m, the site was dedicated to Hercules in Classical antiquity, but after the conversion to Christianity, it was dedicated to Saint Michael the Archangel. First documented in a papal bull of 1183 by Pope Lucius III, it was used as a washhouse by the women of nearby Pescocostanzo in 1536 and as a military base by the Germans during World War II. The building was restored in 1598, as evidenced by the inscription on the architrave of the portal.

== Architecture ==
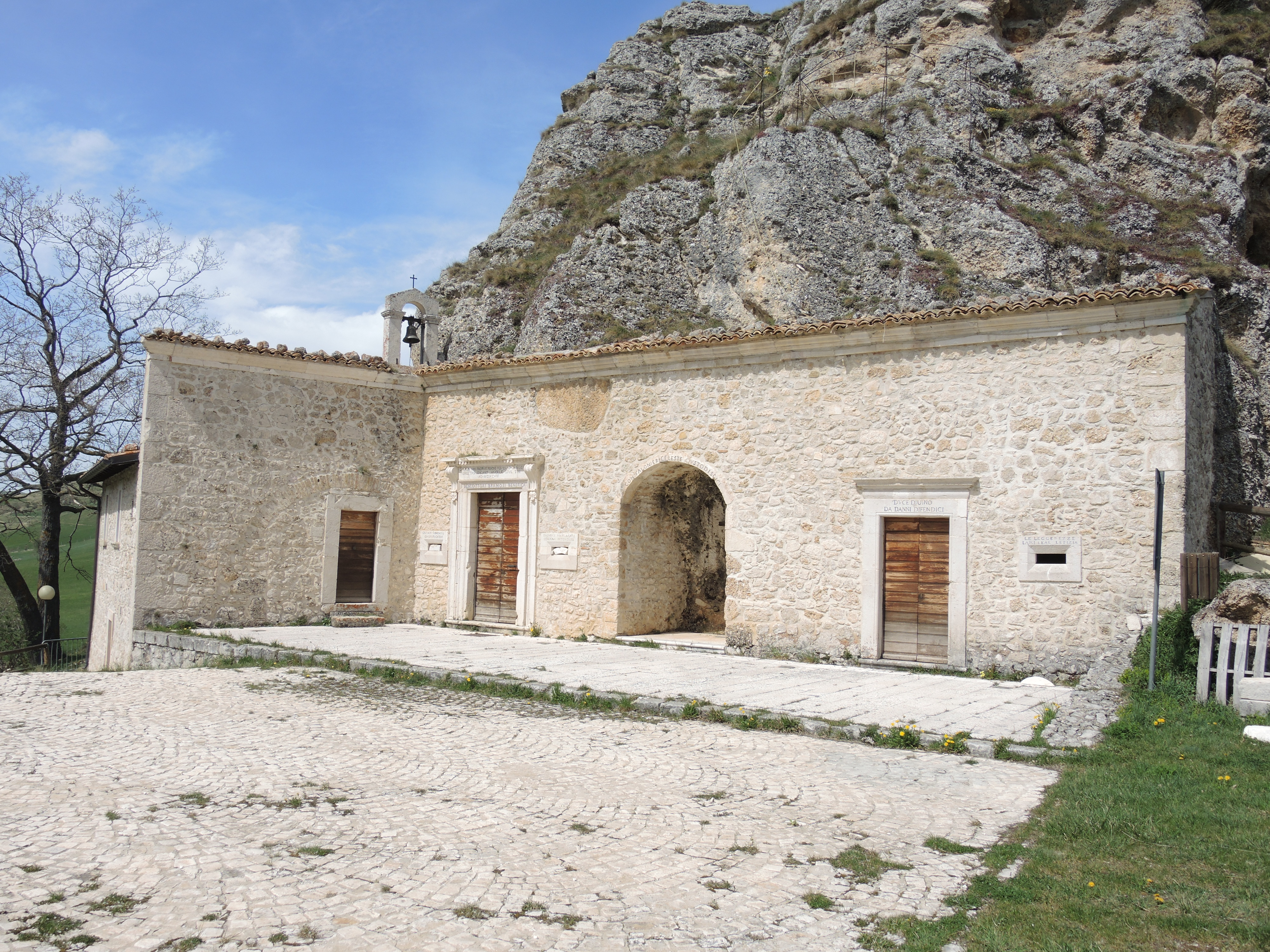
External view of the hermitage

The hermitage consists of the worship church and a residential area, both located at an angle and carved into the rock. On the larger side, dedicated to worship, there are small splayed openings and two doors. The larger door on the left leads to the church, while the smaller door on the right leads to the Ricciardelli family funeral chapel, a noble family from Pescocostanzo. There is also a round-arched niche between the two doors with several inscriptions, one of which commemorates the 1598 restoration. Inside, the church has a rocky vault and a stone floor ending with an intricately carved stone parapet. The interior features a small column at the entrance and the remains of an altar, with a nearby niche that once held a stone statue of the saint, now preserved in the church of Madonna del Rosario, along with decorative marble slabs.

The residential area, historically used as a shelter by shepherds during transhumance, is spread over two floors, each comprising two interconnected rooms. The upper floor is at the same level as the church and features a barrel vault, remnants of a stone seat, a round niche, and two splayed windows. The lower floor, accessible via a hatch or a door, contains a single window and a flat ceiling, and unlike the upper floor, it is not carved into the rock.
