= Pescocostanzo =

- Comune
- Comune di Pescocostanzo
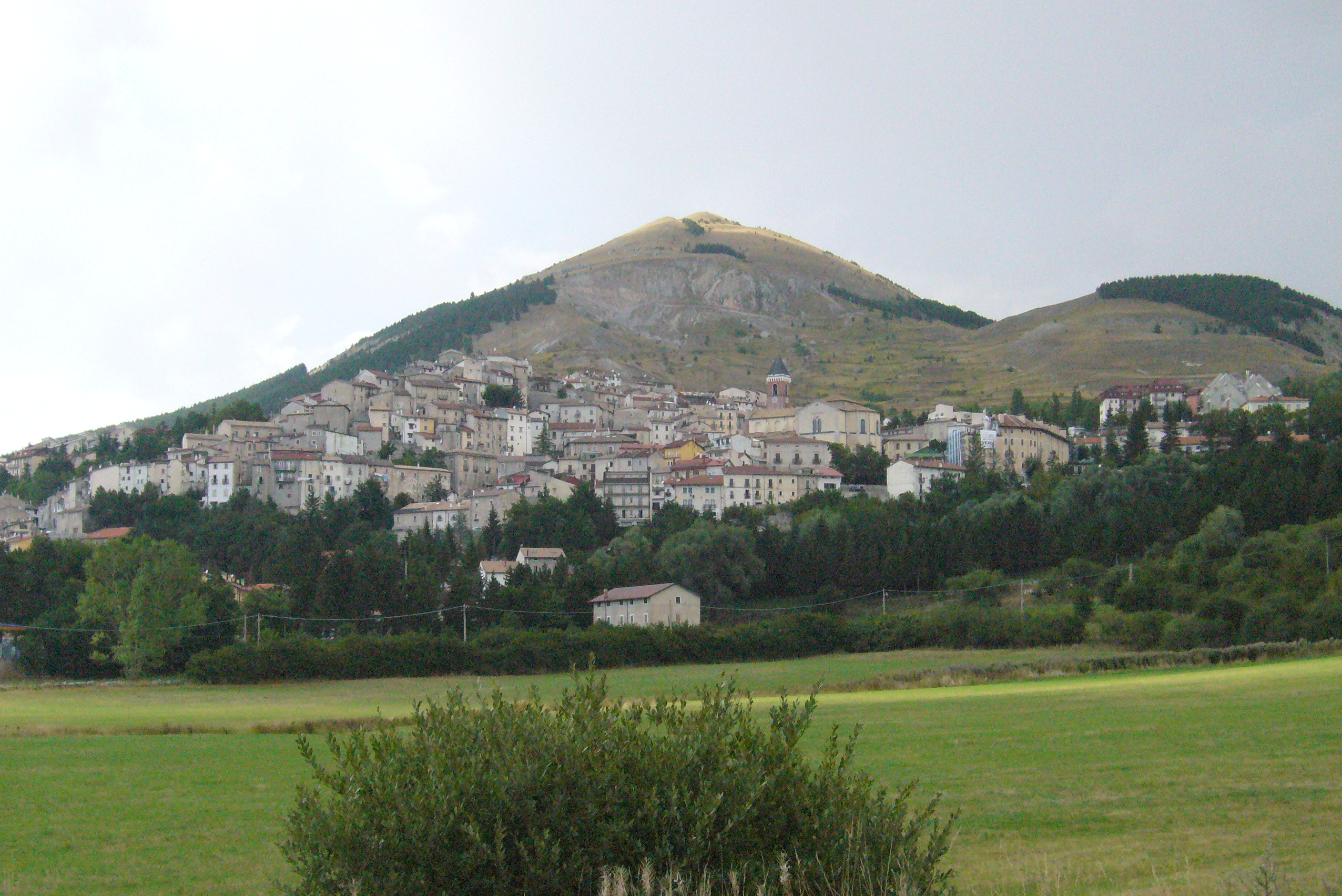

- Location within Italy Location within Abruzzo
- Coordinates: 41°53′14″N 14°3′59″E
- Country: Italy
- Region: Abruzzo
- Province: L'Aquila (AQ)
- Frazioni: Sant'Antonio Bosco

Area
  - Total: 52.16 km^{2} (20.14 sq mi)
- Elevation: 1,395 m (4,577 ft)

Population (1 January 2007)
  - Total: 1,196
  - Density: 22.93/km^{2} (59.39/sq mi)
- Demonym: Pescolani
- Time zone: UTC+1 (CET)
  - Summer (DST): UTC+2 (CEST)
- Postal code: 67033
- Dialing code: 0864
- ISTAT code: 066070
- Patron saint: San Felice
- Saint day: 8 August
- Website: Official website

Pescocostanzo is a comune and town of 1038 inhabitants in the Province of L'Aquila in the Abruzzo region of Italy. It is a tourist destination, attracting people from all over Italy due to its landscape and environment. It is part of the Maiella National Park and is one of I Borghi più belli d'Italia ("The most beautiful villages of Italy"). In winter, Pescocostanzo is a destination for skiers and snowboarders, and has its own ski resort. The towns of Roccaraso and Rivisondoli are close by.

== Gallery ==
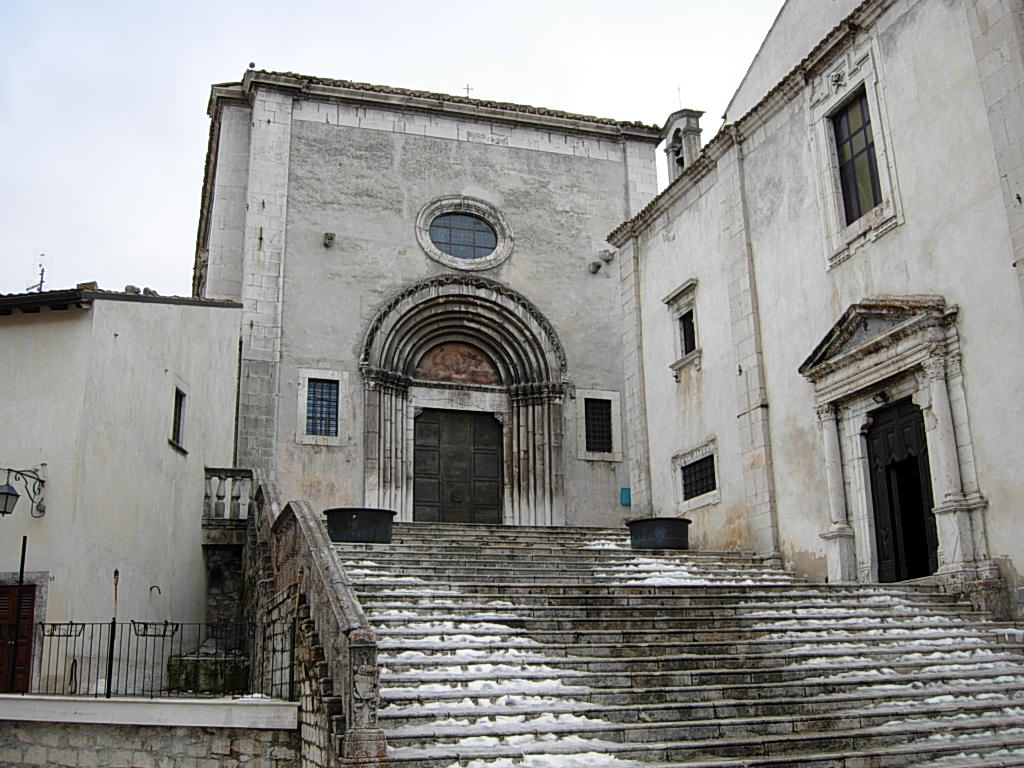
Basilica della Madonna del Colle

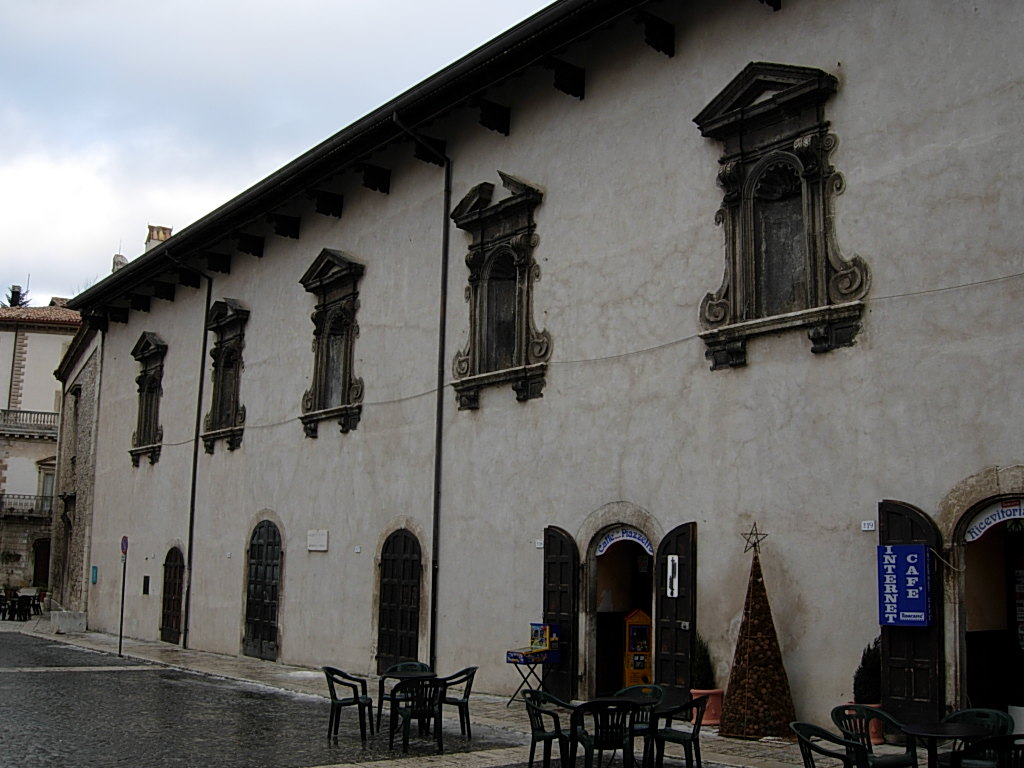
Palazzo Fanzago

== Climate ==
Climate data for Pescocostanzo, elevation 1,371 m (4,498 ft), (1991-2020)
Month	Jan	Feb	Mar	Apr	May	Jun	Jul	Aug	Sep	Oct	Nov	Dec	Year
Record high °C (°F)	14.2 (57.6)	17.0 (62.6)	19.2 (66.6)	21.5 (70.7)	26.5 (79.7)	30.0 (86.0)	33.5 (92.3)	33.5 (92.3)	30.5 (86.9)	23.5 (74.3)	19.9 (67.8)	17.1 (62.8)	33.5 (92.3)
Mean daily maximum °C (°F)	3.3 (37.9)	3.4 (38.1)	6.5 (43.7)	10.6 (51.1)	15.1 (59.2)	19.5 (67.1)	22.4 (72.3)	22.9 (73.2)	17.2 (63.0)	13.7 (56.7)	8.5 (47.3)	4.0 (39.2)	12.3 (54.1)
Daily mean °C (°F)	0.5 (32.9)	0.3 (32.5)	3.2 (37.8)	6.7 (44.1)	11.0 (51.8)	15.1 (59.2)	17.7 (63.9)	18.1 (64.6)	13.2 (55.8)	10.0 (50.0)	5.4 (41.7)	1.3 (34.3)	8.5 (47.3)
Mean daily minimum °C (°F)	−2.3 (27.9)	−2.8 (27.0)	−0.2 (31.6)	2.9 (37.2)	6.8 (44.2)	10.6 (51.1)	13.0 (55.4)	13.4 (56.1)	9.1 (48.4)	6.4 (43.5)	2.4 (36.3)	−1.3 (29.7)	4.8 (40.6)
Record low °C (°F)	−18.5 (−1.3)	−15.6 (3.9)	−14.5 (5.9)	−10.2 (13.6)	−5.5 (22.1)	0.0 (32.0)	1.2 (34.2)	2.0 (35.6)	−2.0 (28.4)	−7.0 (19.4)	−12.0 (10.4)	−18.8 (−1.8)	−18.8 (−1.8)
Source 1: Istituto Superiore per la Protezione e la Ricerca Ambientale
Source 2: Regione Abruzzo

== See also ==
- Santa Maria del Colle
- Hermitage of Saint Anthony
- Hermitage of San Michele Arcangelo
