= Santi Pietro e Tommaso, Montasola =

Roman catholic church in Lazio, Italy

Coordinates: 42°23′08.4″N 12°40′51.1″E

Santi Pietro e Tommaso is the Roman Catholic parish church in town of Montasola, in the province of Rieti, region of Lazio, Italy.

== History ==
The church at the site was first commissioned in 1191 by Pope Celestine III, and was dependent on the Abbey of Farfa. The marble inscription in the portal dates a major refurbishment or restoration in 1721. The church has five altars, with the main altar dedicated both to the eucharist and the assumption of the Virgin. In the central niche of the apse is a wooden statue of the Virgin, standing beside on a St Antony and a cult statue of the Virgin. The rose marble balustrade was installed in 1923, and derives from the former church of Santa Maria Murella.

Along the right wall, the first altarpiece is a 16th-century canvas depicting the Virgin of the Rosary, St Dominic, and a nun. The canvas is surrounded by 15 smaller depiction of the mysteries of the Rosary. The 14th-century apse frescoes are attributed to Domenico Rainaldi. They depict the Virgin and Child with Saints Peter and Francis.

The first altarpiece on the left, dedicated to Santa Maria in Cecalupi, also known as Santa Maria della Neve (Holy Mary of the Snows). The fresco depicts the Virgin with Saints Eusebius and John the Baptist. The second altarpiece on the left has an altar dedicated to St Prospero, derived from the former church of San Antonino. The canvas dates to the 16th century.

The holy water font derives from the 1400s. The framed cassettes in the ceiling date to the 16th-century and include a canvas derived also from Santa Maria Murella, depicting the Virgin and Child with Saints Peter and Charles Borromeo and a donor. It is suspected the donor is Angelo Bonelli, 17th-century patron of the former church. The facade is simple, and shows evidence of the multiple reconstructions.
