= San Michele Arcangelo, Bolognola =

Church in Bolognola, Italy

Coordinates: 42°59′36″N 13°13′42″E

San Michele Arcangelo is a Roman Catholic church located in the center of the town of Bolognola, province of Macerata, region of Marche, Italy.

== History ==
The church and its tall bell tower were rebuilt in a Gothic Revival-style after avalanches in 1930 and 1934 destroyed the prior church. The church contains a polyptych by Giulio Vergari of Amandola and a fresco detached from the razed church of Santa Maria a Piè del Sasso depicting the Crucifixion.
