= San Michele Arcangelo, Greccio =

Church building in Greccio, Italy

Coordinates: 42°26′42″N 12°45′08″E

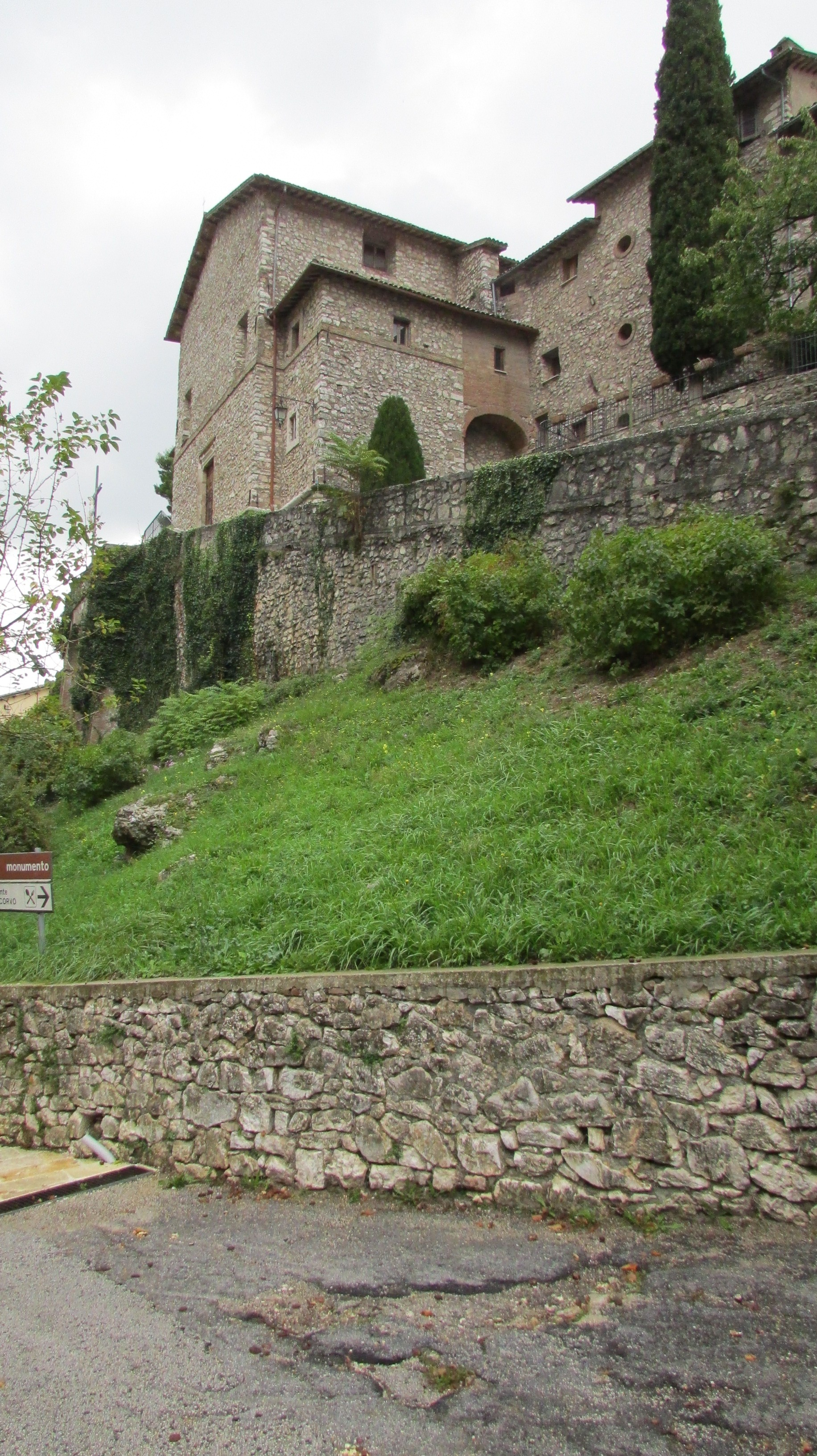
St Michael the Archangel 10-13 790.jpg

San Michele Arcangelo (Italian: St Michael the Archangel) is a Baroque-style, Roman Catholic parish church located in the center of the town of Greccio, in the province of Rieti, region of Lazio, Italy.

== History ==
Likely the site had a church since the early medieval times, and is cited on a hill that rises above the town. The church suffered from looting and damage by Napoleonic French troops in 1799, and remained closed until 1808, when Bernasconi of Rieti, and later the engineer Fedeli pursued a restoration completed in 1825. The interiors were refurbished in a baroque style. During the second world war, the roof was restored, as well as consolidation of the walls, damaged by the 1915 earthquake.

The interior has a number of 16th-century artworks. The interior has a single nave with two lateral chapels, dedicated respectively to St Antony of Padua and the Virgin of the Immaculate Conception. This latter chapel, on the left, has a stucco decoration from 1636 by Gregorio Grimani. The main altar is dedicated to St Michael Archangel, patron of the town, and the main altarpiece is a 19th-century depiction. On the walls and ceiling are frescoes depicting the Last Supper and Pentecost. A gilded silver Calyx from the 19th century is on display.

The bell-tower, erected in the 17th-century at the site of a former tower linked to the walls of the ancient town. Nearby is the church of Santa Maria Del Giglio, also decorated in baroque style. It contains a canvas depicting an Adoration by the Shepherds attributed to Carlo Maratta, and another depicting the Madonna and Child with Saints Joseph and Aloyisus Gonzaga painted in 1784 by B. Raoni. Finally a 19th-century canvas depicts the Martyrdom of Franciscan Missionaries in Morocco by Zoffoli.
