= San Michele Arcangelo, Rivodutri =

Church in Rivodutri, Italy

San Michele Arcangelo is the Roman Catholic parish church in the center of the town of Rivodutri, in the province of Rieti, region of Lazio, Italy.

== History ==
A church at the site was likely present from early medieval times, and is documented in 1252 in a list of churches under the bishop of Rieti. Churches dedicated to St Michael were favored by the Lombards, and often located in mountain-top sites.

The present church was rebuilt at this site after a 1703 earthquake, work continued until 1769. In 1775 the clock was added to the bell-tower. The church has a single nave with a square apse, and has two chapels on either side. The first on the right has a depiction of the Madonna del Buon Consiglio (1756) by Pietro Bada. The second is dedicated respectively to the Santissima Pietà and the Holy Rosary. This chapel holds a prized canvas depicting La Pietà with Saints Matthew and Francis (1626-1626) by Vincenzo Manenti. On the walls are depiction of the Mysteries of the Rosary. The main altar has a large display of the Crucifixion including depictions of two co-patrons of the town, the martyred saints Abdon e Sennen. The second chapel on the left has frescoes detached from the former Chiesa dell’Annunziata, damaged by the earthquake of 1948. On the bell-tower, below the clock, is a small bas-relief of St Michael slaying the Dragon, this likely derives from the original church.
