= Santissima Trinità, Forano =

Church in Forano, Italy

Coordinates: 42.296658°N 12.595450°E

The church of the Santissima Trinità is a Baroque-style, Roman Catholic church located on Piazza Vittorio Emanuele 26 the center of the town of Forano, province of Rieti, region of Lazio, central Italy.

== History ==
The then Duke of Forano, Luigi Strozzi, patronized construction of this church between 1675 and 1682. The cost was 12,000 scudi, and it utilized material from the then vacant Castello di Colle Nero. It replaced the older former parish church, Santa Maria del Transito, which located adjacent to the Palazzo Baronale, which has a posterior facade about 50 meters south of this church. The oval enclosure of houses around the former palace, delimited the first medieval town walls, and thus housed the former parish church. The town's former parish church was converted into the Duke's personal chapel. The former altars and artworks of the older church were transferred to this church. The older structure had been deconsecrated and the ruins collapsed in the 1930s.

Santa Trinita has a worn brick facade, meant to have been faced with stone or marble. The church was damaged in the 1915 Avezzano earthquake, and reopened five years later. The frieze in front reads SS[Santissimi] TRINITA ET B[eata] MARIAE VIRGINI. The second floor has a modern stained glass depiction of the Virgin. The interior has marble and stucco decoration. The painting in the apse was commissioned by Strozzi from Girolamo Troppa and depicts the Coronation of the Virgin with Saints Jerome and Antony.
