= Castelnuovo della Daunia =

- Comune
- Comune di Castelnuovo della Daunia
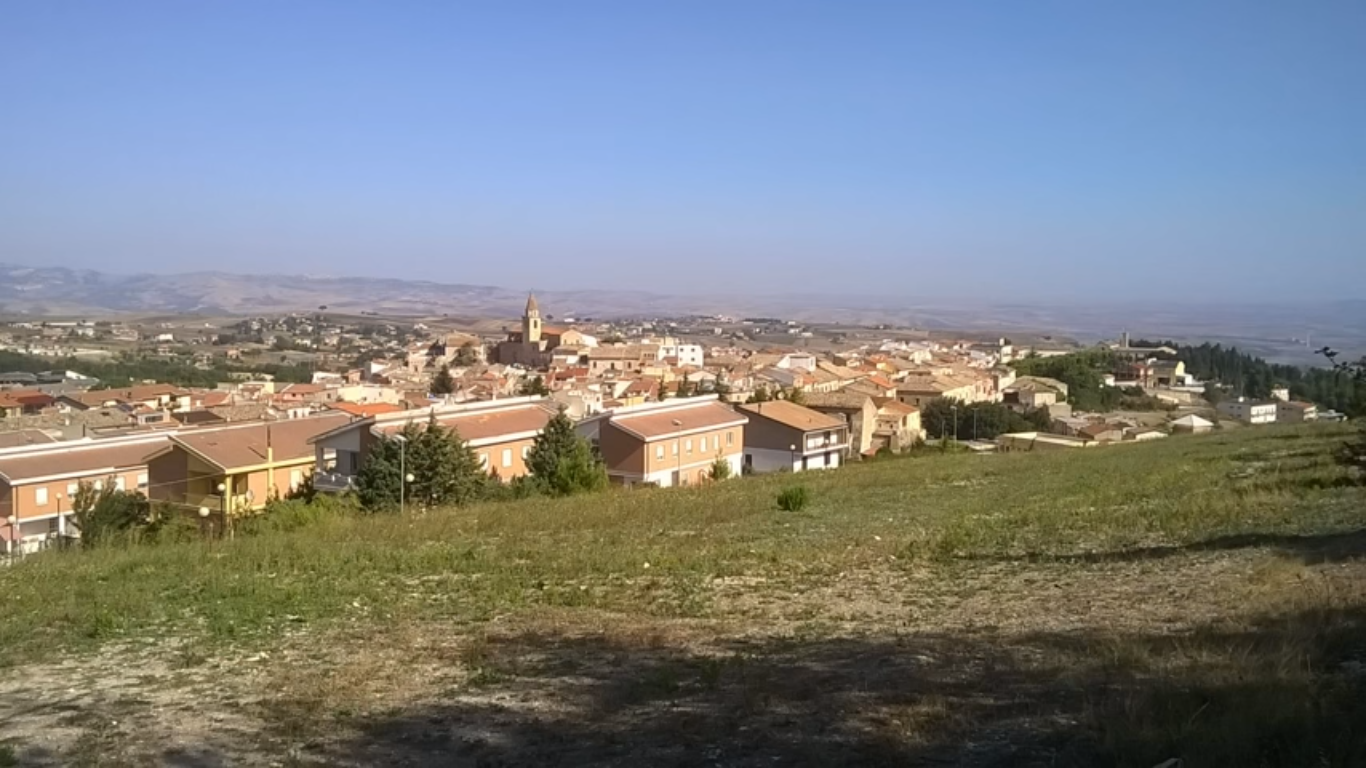
- View of Castelnuovo della Daunia

- Location within Italy Location within Apulia
- Coordinates: 41°35′N 15°7′E
- Country: Italy
- Region: Apulia
- Province: Foggia (FG)

Government
  - Mayor: Guerino De Luca

Area
  - Total: 61.49 km^{2} (23.74 sq mi)
- Elevation: 600 m (2,000 ft)

Population (28 February 2017)
  - Total: 1,414
  - Density: 23.00/km^{2} (59.56/sq mi)
- Demonym: Castelnovesi
- Time zone: UTC+1 (CET)
  - Summer (DST): UTC+2 (CEST)
- Postal code: 71034
- Dialing code: 0881
- Patron saint: Santa Maria della Murgia
- Saint day: 15 September
- Website: Official website

Castelnuovo della Daunia (until 1863 just called "Castelnuovo") is an Italian municipality (comune) with 1365 inhabitants (December 31, 2018) in the province of Foggia in Puglia, Italy.

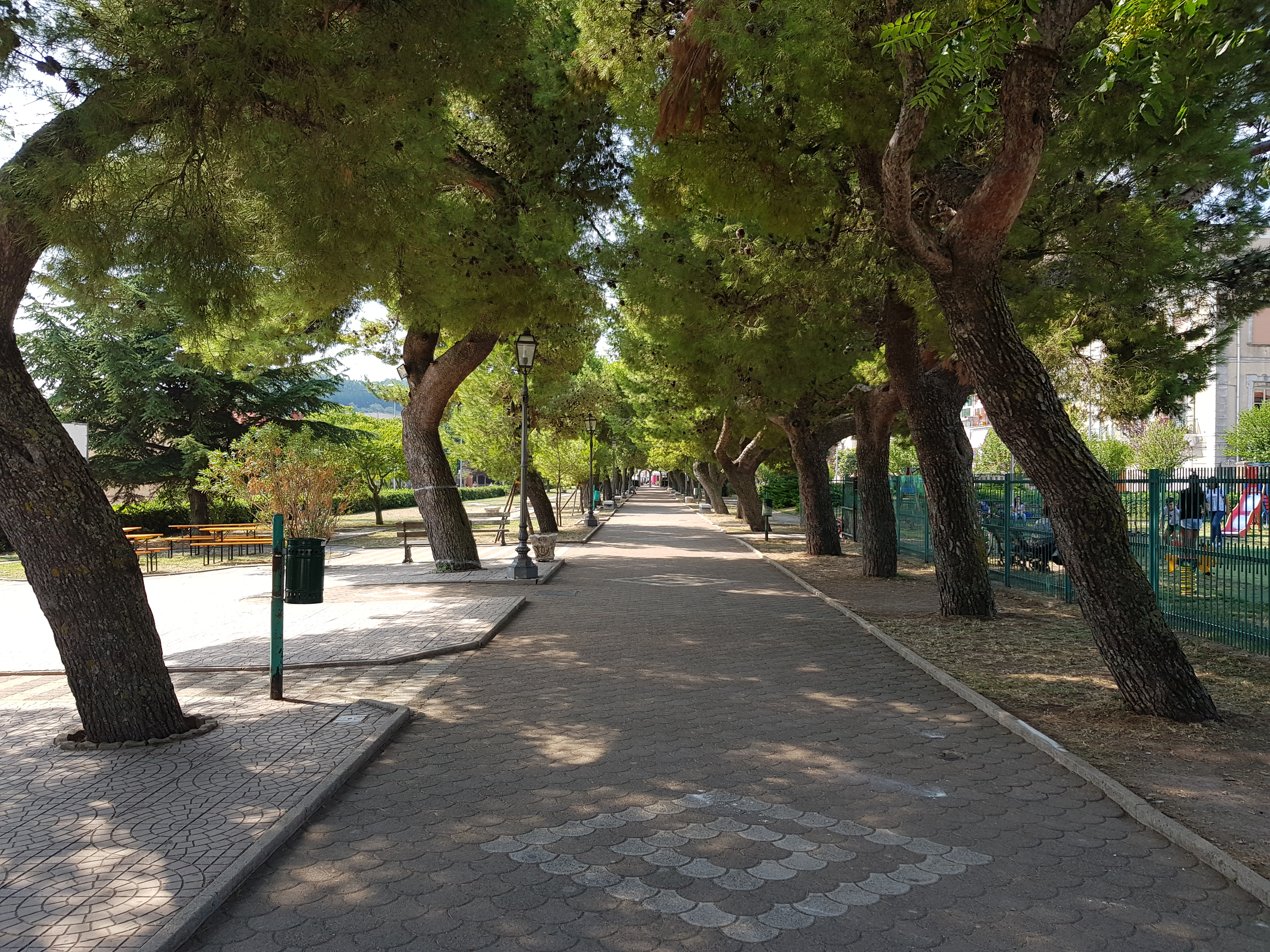
The park Villa Comunale in Castelnuovo della Daunia.

The municipality is located approximately 38 kilometers northwest away from Foggia and it borders directly on the province of Campobasso (Molise). The town is known for its good air quality and mineral water from the La Cavallina spring.

Years ago, the water was used to be sold all over Italy.

== History ==
The municipality was founded by the Schiavone, Furthermore, it was settled by a maturity of slavs. The palazzo baronale, the current place of the town hall, was built in the 11th century. The place received the name "Castelnuovo" during the 15th century. Numerous Albanians - who fled from the Turkish massacres in their hometown - immigrated to Castelnuovo between 1468 and 1476. This led to an intolerance towards the refugees which made it difficult for them to live together.

On 18 April 1863, the town council decided to give the place a surname in order to distinguish the municipality from the other municipalities with the same name. The new name "Castelnuovo della Daunia" emphasizes the belonging to the Monti Dauni mountain range.

== Places ==
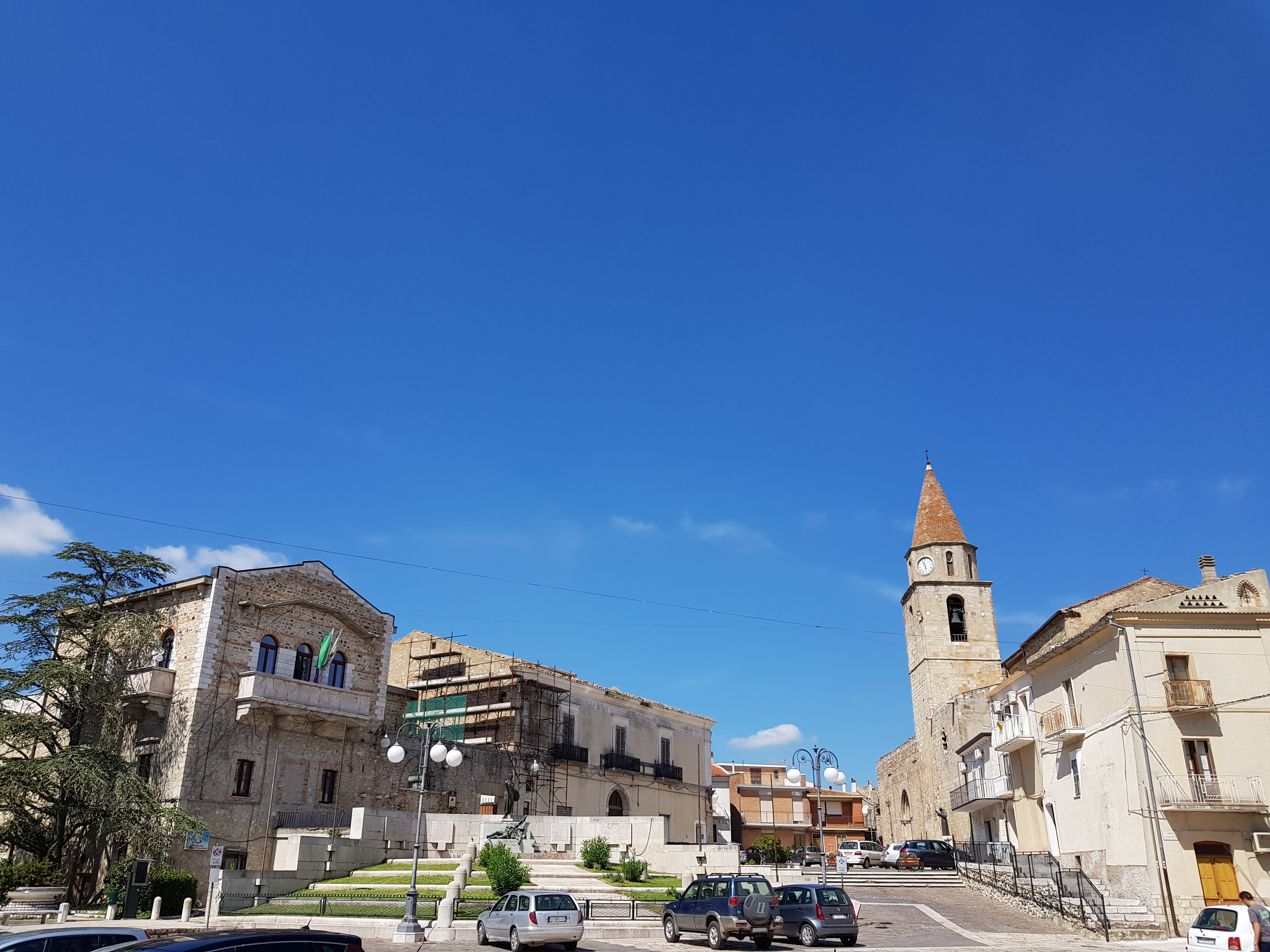
The Piazza Plebiscito with a view of the town hall and the Santa Maria della Murgia church.

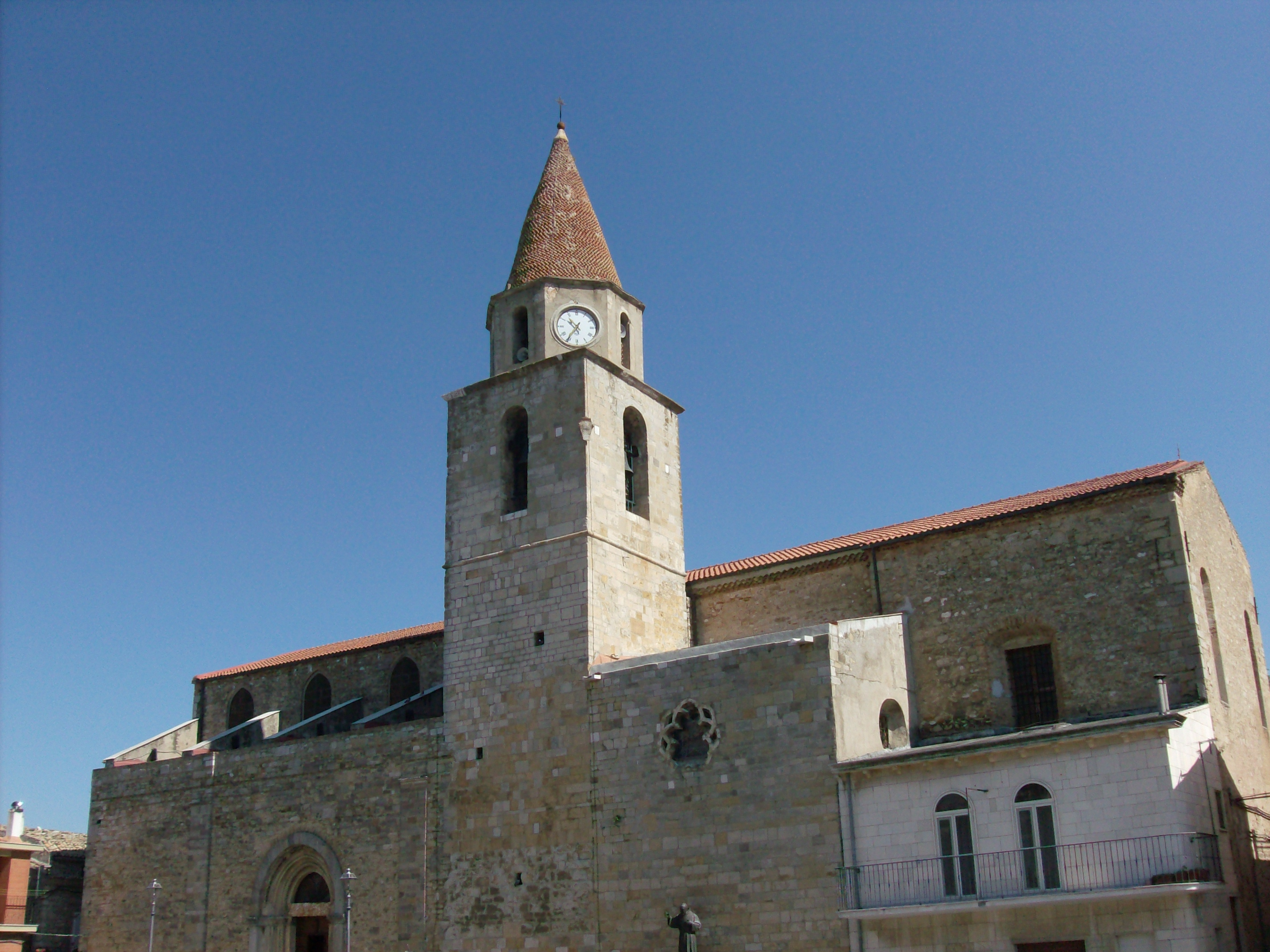
The church Santa Maria della Murgia.

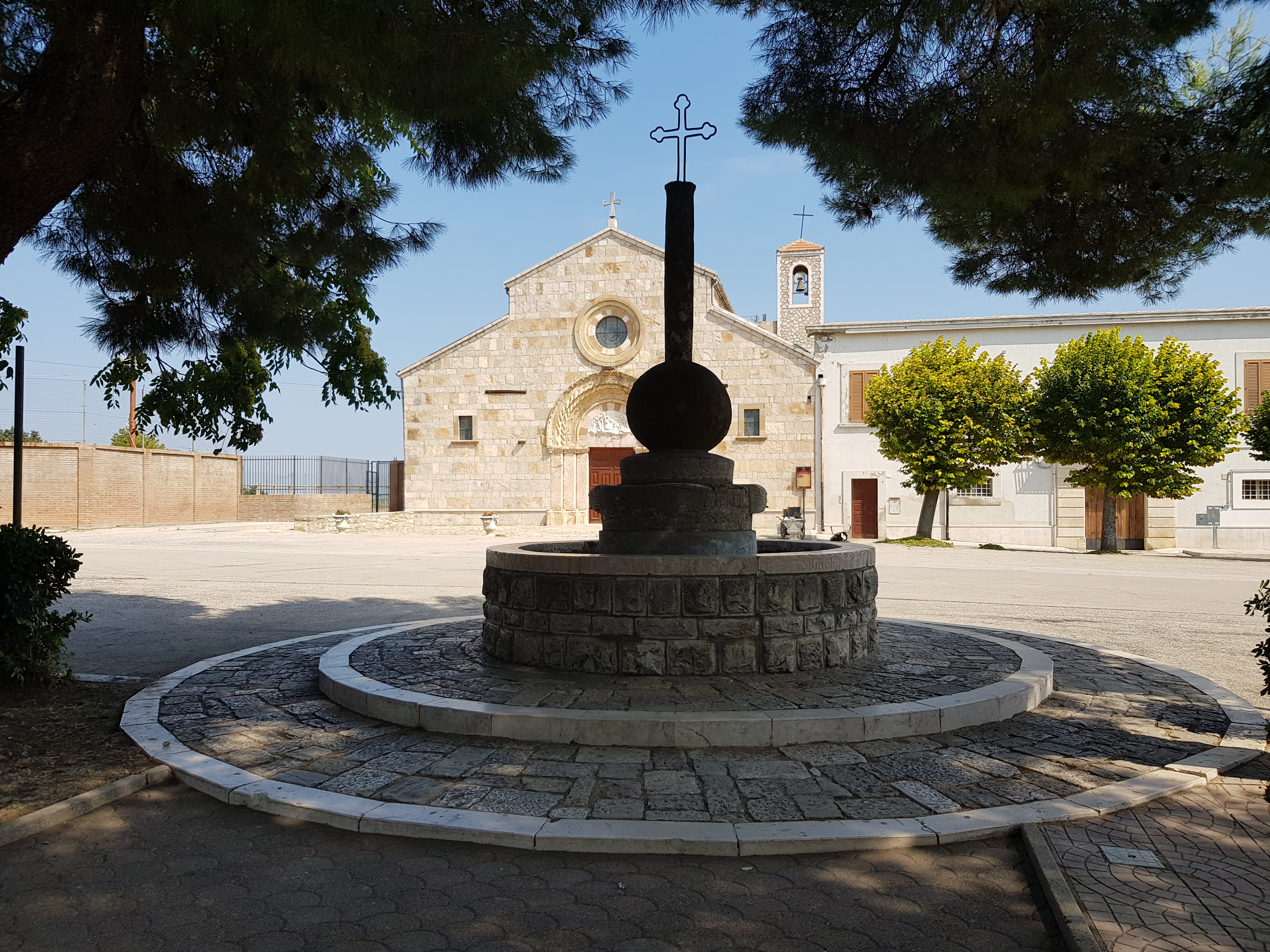
The Convento Santa Maria Maddalena.

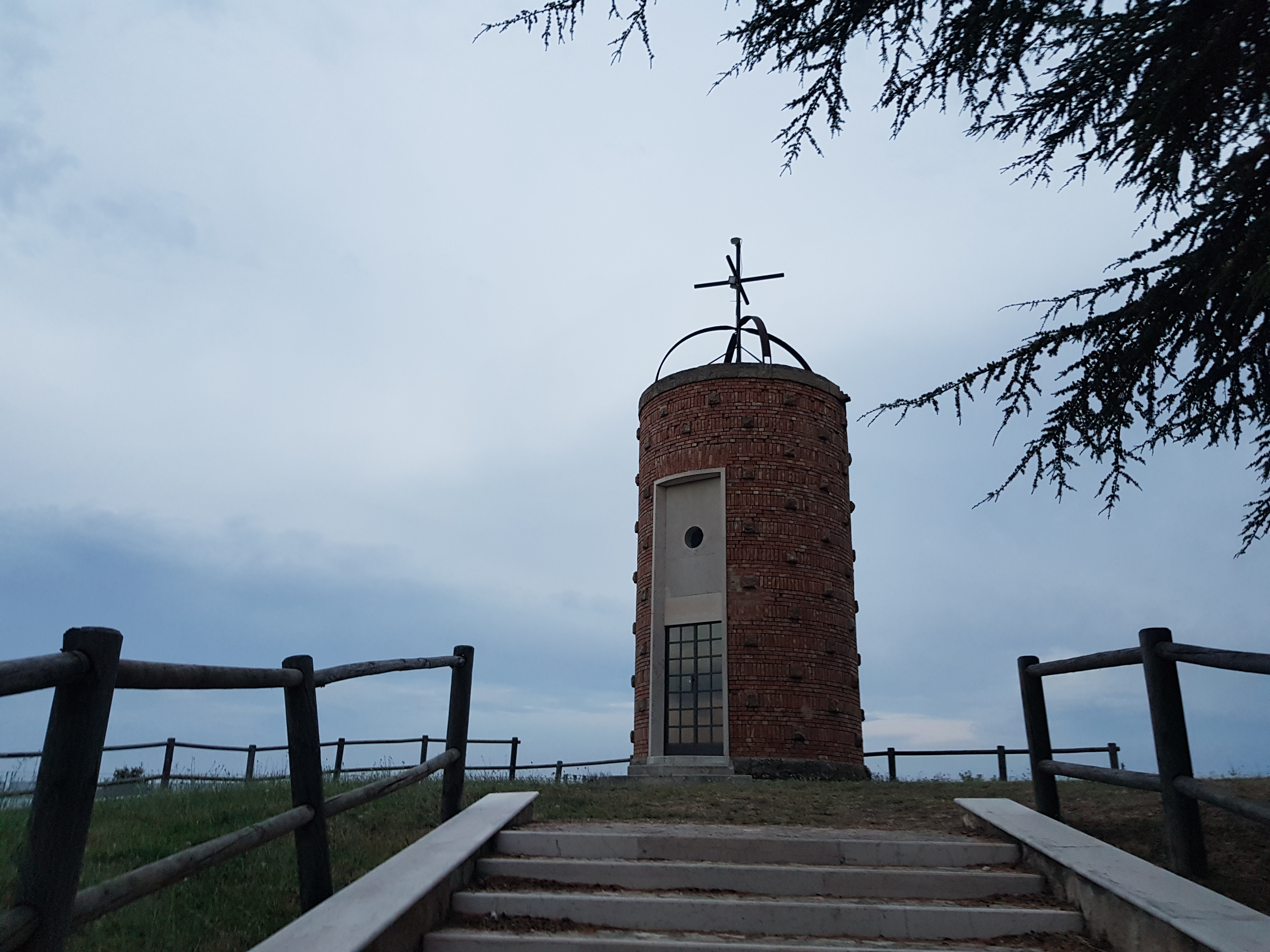
The chapel and viewpoint La Cappellina.

== Politics ==
Since 27 May 2014, the mayor from Castelnuovo della Daunia is Guerino De Luca.

== Problems ==
Castelnuovo della Daunia faces two major problems.

=== Emigration ===
Like many other smaller municipalities in Italy, Castelnuovo della Daunia also has to deal with the consequences of the population's emigration from the village. In 1951, the town had a population of over 3600 inhabitants. In 2016 it reached a total of approximately 1400 inhabitants. A reason therefor include a lack of future perspectives, especially for young people.

=== Ruins & Public funds ===
In the past few years, the place had increased media coverage when various grievances were uncovered. On 28 September 2015, the Italian journal "Fatto Quotidiano" reported that Castelnuovo della Daunia has a high negative record of ruins. In addition, the journal reported the waste of public funds. About ten million euro were spent on the construction of the infrastructure and buildings which never were commissioned. It includes a prison, an amphitheater and an entire holiday complex with several vacation homes. Moreover, the Italian satirical show "Striscia la Noteia" targeted therefor the municipality several times.

In an interview, the mayor Guerino De Luca denied that Castelnuovo della Daunia was a "village of waste". He stated that the construction of the prison was commissioned by the Italian Ministry of Justice and that the failed planning of them were the reason for the lack of success. According to him, the local government of Castelnuovo della Daunia was not involved. In addition to that, he referred to the public investments that were working well for years like the local thermal facility.

== Websites ==
- Official website from Castelnuovo della Daunia
- Castelnuovo della Daunia - Collection of Images, videos and more.
- Location on the world map
- Italian National Institute of Statistics (Istat)
