= Forano =

- Comune
- Comune di Forano
- Location within Italy Location within Lazio
- Coordinates: 42°18′N 12°36′E
- Country: Italy
- Region: Lazio
- Province: Province of Rieti (RI)

Area
  - Total: 17.5 km^{2} (6.8 sq mi)
- Elevation: 218 m (715 ft)

Population (Dec. 2004)
  - Total: 2,697
  - Density: 154/km^{2} (399/sq mi)
- Demonym: Foranesi
- Time zone: UTC+1 (CET)
  - Summer (DST): UTC+2 (CEST)
- Postal code: 02044
- Dialing code: 0765
- Website: Official website

Forano is a comune (municipality) in the province of Rieti, in the Italian region of Latium, located about 45 kilometres (28 mi) north of Rome and about 25 kilometres (16 mi) southwest of Rieti. As of 31 December 2004, it had a population of 2,697 and an area of 17.5 square kilometres (6.8 mi^{2}).

Forano borders the following municipalities: Cantalupo in Sabina, Filacciano, Poggio Catino, Poggio Mirteto, Ponzano Romano, Selci, Stimigliano, Tarano.

The Roman Catholic parish church is Santissima Trinità.

== Demographic evolution ==
Historical population

Year	Pop.	±%
1861	992	—
1871	1,151	+16.0%
1881	1,284	+11.6%
1901	1,465	+14.1%
1911	1,846	+26.0%

Year	Pop.	±%
1921	1,854	+0.4%
1931	1,887	+1.8%
1936	2,100	+11.3%
1951	2,353	+12.0%
1961	2,369	+0.7%

Year	Pop.	±%
1971	2,120	−10.5%
1981	2,164	+2.1%
1991	2,364	+9.2%
2001	2,453	+3.8%

Source: Data from ISTAT
