= Tarano =

- Comune
- Comune di Tarano
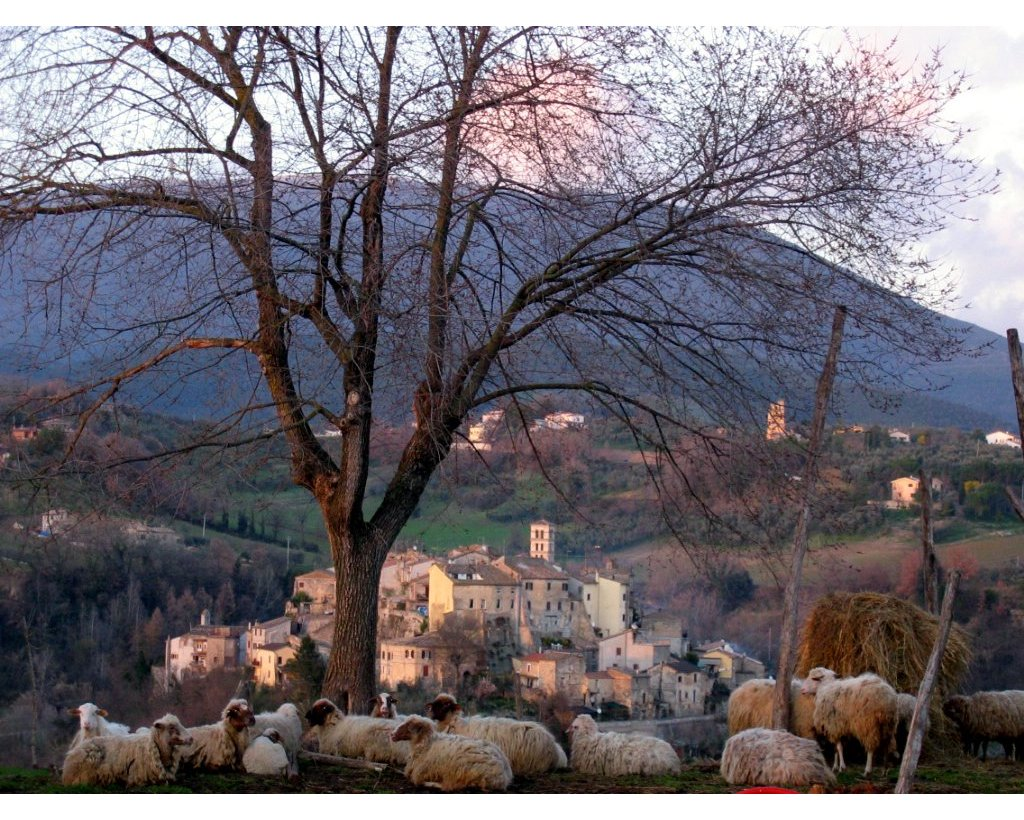
- View of Tarano

- Location within Italy Location within Lazio
- Coordinates: 42°21′N 12°36′E
- Country: Italy
- Region: Lazio
- Province: Province of Rieti (RI)

Area
  - Total: 20.1 km^{2} (7.8 sq mi)
- Elevation: 234 m (768 ft)

Population (Dec. 2004)
  - Total: 1,296
  - Density: 64.5/km^{2} (167/sq mi)
- Time zone: UTC+1 (CET)
  - Summer (DST): UTC+2 (CEST)
- Postal code: 02040
- Dialing code: 0765

Tarano is a comune (municipality) in the Province of Rieti in the Italian region of Latium, located about 50 kilometres (31 mi) north of Rome and about 25 kilometres (16 mi) west of Rieti. On 31 December 2004, it had a population of 1,296 and an area of 20.1 square kilometres (7.8 mi^{2}).

Tarano borders the municipalities of Collevecchio, Forano, Montebuono, Selci, Stimigliano, and Torri in Sabina.

== Demographic evolution ==
Historical population

Year	Pop.	±%
1861	904	—
1871	997	+10.3%
1881	1,095	+9.8%
1901	1,438	+31.3%
1911	1,585	+10.2%

Year	Pop.	±%
1921	1,587	+0.1%
1931	1,595	+0.5%
1936	1,710	+7.2%
1951	1,704	−0.4%
1961	1,479	−13.2%

Year	Pop.	±%
1971	1,133	−23.4%
1981	1,077	−4.9%
1991	1,141	+5.9%
2001	1,198	+5.0%

Source: Data from ISTAT
