= Ponzano Romano =

- Comune
- Comune di Ponzano Romano
- Location within Italy Location within Lazio
- Coordinates: 42°15′N 12°34′E
- Country: Italy
- Region: Lazio
- Metropolitan city: Rome (RM)

Area
  - Total: 19.3 km^{2} (7.5 sq mi)
- Elevation: 205 m (673 ft)

Population (Dec. 2004)
  - Total: 1,061
  - Density: 55.0/km^{2} (142/sq mi)
- Time zone: UTC+1 (CET)
  - Summer (DST): UTC+2 (CEST)
- Postal code: 00060
- Dialing code: 0765

Ponzano Romano is a comune (municipality) in the Metropolitan City of Rome in the Italian region of Latium, located about 40 kilometres (25 mi) north of Rome. As of 31 December 2004, it had a population of 1,061 and an area of 19.3 square kilometres (7.5 mi^{2}).

Ponzano Romano borders the following municipalities: Civita Castellana, Civitella San Paolo, Collevecchio, Filacciano, Forano, Nazzano, Sant'Oreste, Stimigliano.

== Demographic evolution ==
Historical population

| Year | Pop. | ±% |
|---|---|---|
| 1861 | ? | — |
| 1871 | 816 | — |
| 1881 | 883 | +8.2% |
| 1901 | 1,022 | +15.7% |
| 1911 | 1,121 | +9.7% |

| Year | Pop. | ±% |
|---|---|---|
| 1921 | 1,152 | +2.8% |
| 1931 | 1,109 | −3.7% |
| 1936 | 1,164 | +5.0% |
| 1951 | 1,205 | +3.5% |
| 1961 | 1,021 | −15.3% |

| Year | Pop. | ±% |
|---|---|---|
| 1971 | 884 | −13.4% |
| 1981 | 890 | +0.7% |
| 1991 | 906 | +1.8% |
| 2001 | 1,028 | +13.5% |

Source: Data from ISTAT
