= Montebuono =

- Comune
- Comune di Montebuono
- Coat of arms

- Location within Italy Location within Lazio
- Coordinates: 42°22′N 12°36′E
- Country: Italy
- Region: Lazio
- Province: Rieti (RI)
- Frazioni: Fianello, S.Andrea

Government
  - Mayor: Claudio Antonelli

Area
  - Total: 19.6 km^{2} (7.6 sq mi)
- Elevation: 325 m (1,066 ft)

Population (2008)
  - Total: 945
  - Density: 48.2/km^{2} (125/sq mi)
- Demonym: Montebuonesi
- Time zone: UTC+1 (CET)
  - Summer (DST): UTC+2 (CEST)
- Postal code: 02040
- Dialing code: 0765
- Website: Official website

Montebuono is a comune (municipality) in the Province of Rieti in the Italian region of Latium, located about 50 kilometres (31 miles) north of Rome and about 20 kilometres (12 mi) west of Rieti.

Montebuono borders the following municipalities: Calvi dell'Umbria, Collevecchio, Magliano Sabina, Tarano, Torri in Sabina.
