= Selci, Italy =

Selci
- Comune
- Comune di Selci
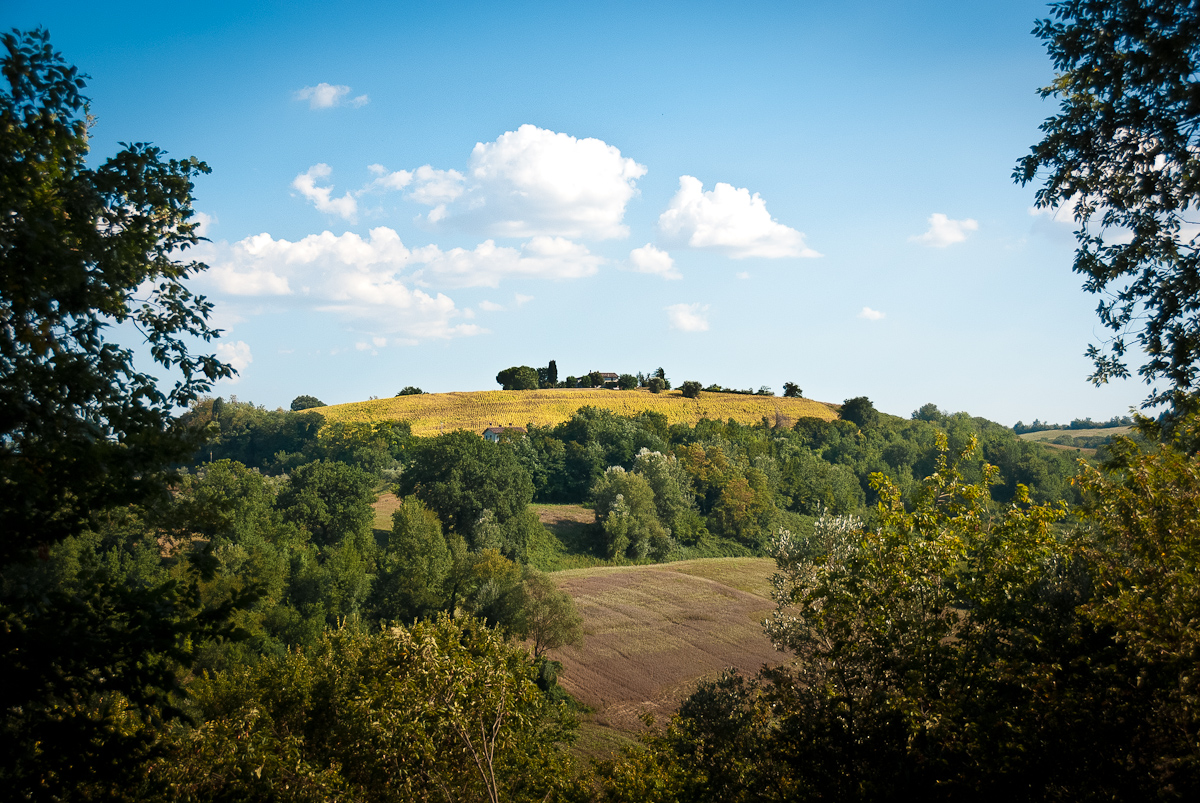
- Selci countryside

- Location within Italy Location within Lazio
- Coordinates: 42°19′N 12°37′E
- Country: Italy
- Region: Lazio
- Province: Province of Rieti (RI)

Area
  - Total: 7.8 km^{2} (3.0 sq mi)
- Elevation: 204 m (669 ft)

Population (Dec. 2004)
  - Total: 1,038
  - Density: 130/km^{2} (340/sq mi)
- Time zone: UTC+1 (CET)
  - Summer (DST): UTC+2 (CEST)
- Postal code: 02040
- Dialing code: 0765
- Website: Official website

Selci (Italian: [ˈseltʃi]) is a comune (municipality) in the Province of Rieti in the Italian region of Latium, located about 45 kilometres (28 mi) north of Rome and about 25 kilometres (16 mi) southwest of Rieti. As of 31 December 2004, it had a population of 1,038 and an area of 7.8 square kilometres (3.0 mi^{2}).

Selci borders the following municipalities: Cantalupo in Sabina, Forano, Tarano, Torri in Sabina.

== Demographic evolution ==
Historical population

Year	Pop.	±%
1861	1,068	—
1871	1,103	+3.3%
1881	1,088	−1.4%
1901	1,193	+9.7%
1911	1,086	−9.0%

Year	Pop.	±%
1921	1,076	−0.9%
1931	1,268	+17.8%
1936	1,332	+5.0%
1951	1,301	−2.3%
1961	1,147	−11.8%

Year	Pop.	±%
1971	969	−15.5%
1981	972	+0.3%
1991	937	−3.6%
2001	1,000	+6.7%

Source: Data from ISTAT
