= Communist Combatant Units =

- Unità Comuniste Combattenti
- Leaders: Paolo Bonano, Stefano Neri
- Dates active: 1976–1977
- Active regions: Italy
- Political position: far left

The Communist Combatant Units (Unità Comuniste Combattenti, UCC) was an Italian terrorist group committed to far left. It was formed in 1976 between Lazio, Tuscany and Lombardy after a split of the Communist Armed Formations and the joining of veterans from experiences among the extra-parliamentary left. Its members were mostly students, professionals and employees while the acknowledged leaders were Paolo Bonano, Stefano Neri and Romano Bandoli.

== Ideals and actions ==
UCC was dedicated to attacks against small and medium enterprises (considered as guilty also for the unreported employment), against those who were considered as means of oppression of capital on work. UCC had a particular attention of the problems related to factories of Southern Italy and the struggle against the calculation instruments.

The most notable actions were the injuring of the general director Vittorio Morgera of Poligrafico dello Stato and the raid on the headquarter of Florence of the Associazione delle Piccole e Medie Industrie, both occurred on 29 March 1977. Other notable raids were those in the Calculation Center of Sapienza University of Rome, in the Intersind headquarter of Palermo, in the offices of Tecnotessille in Prato and in the Datamont calculation center of Montedison in Milan.

In 1977, the group was dissolved and some members joined Prima Linea.

In July 1977, the police forces discovered a refuge in the countryside near Vescovio (located in Torri in Sabina, Rieti) where UCCs stored weapons and imprisoned kidnapped people. In June 1984, the Assize Court of Appeal of Rome issued 26 sentences against the UCCs, with a period of reclusion between 2 and 31 years.

UCC had been active in Calabria, Campania, Lazio, Lombardy, Piedmont, Tuscany and Sicily while 102 people had been investigated by the Italian judiciary.

== See also ==
- Years of lead
- Communist terrorism
- Communist Combatant Cells
