= Stimigliano =

- Comune
- Comune di Stimigliano
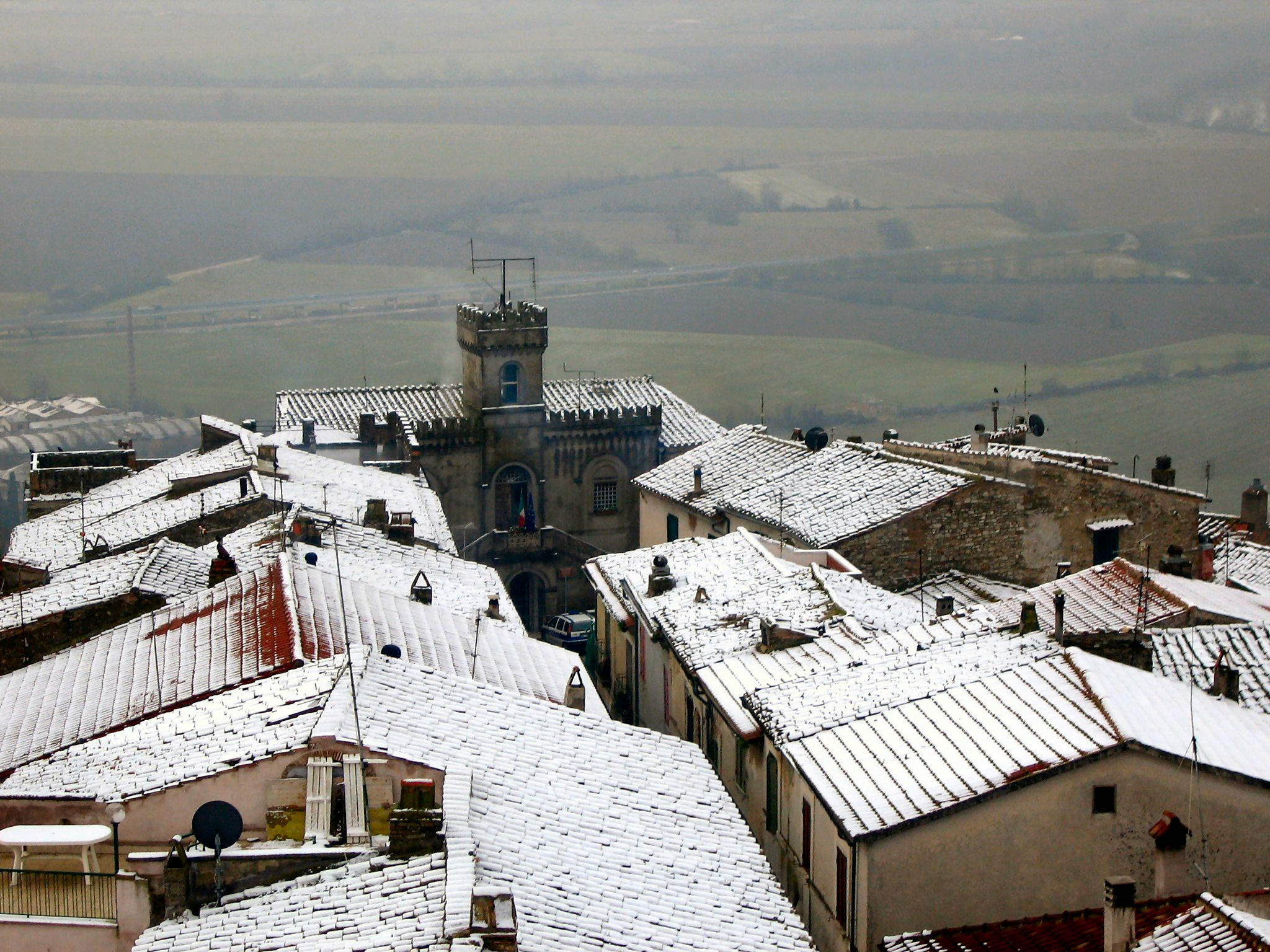
- View of Stimigliano

- Location within Italy Location within Lazio
- Coordinates: 42°18′N 12°34′E
- Country: Italy
- Region: Lazio
- Province: Province of Rieti (RI)

Area
  - Total: 11.38 km^{2} (4.39 sq mi)
- Elevation: 207 m (679 ft)

Population (Gen 2018)
  - Total: 2,321
  - Density: 204.0/km^{2} (528.2/sq mi)
- Time zone: UTC+1 (CET)
  - Summer (DST): UTC+2 (CEST)
- Postal code: 02048
- Dialing code: 0765

Stimigliano is a comune (municipality) in the Province of Rieti in the Italian region of Latium, located about 45 kilometres (28 mi) north of Rome and about 25 kilometres (16 mi) southwest of Rieti. As of 1 January 2018, it had a population of 2,321 and an area of 11.4 square kilometres (4.4 mi^{2}).

Stimigliano borders the following municipalities: Collevecchio, Forano, Ponzano Romano, Sant'Oreste, Tarano.

== Demographic evolution ==
Historical population

Year	Pop.	±%
1861	552	—
1871	595	+7.8%
1881	758	+27.4%
1901	975	+28.6%
1911	1,058	+8.5%

Year	Pop.	±%
1921	1,207	+14.1%
1931	1,240	+2.7%
1936	1,467	+18.3%
1951	1,629	+11.0%
1961	1,738	+6.7%

Year	Pop.	±%
1971	1,664	−4.3%
1981	1,672	+0.5%
1991	1,829	+9.4%
2001	1,744	−4.6%

Source: Data from ISTAT
