= Girolamo Troppa =

Italian painter

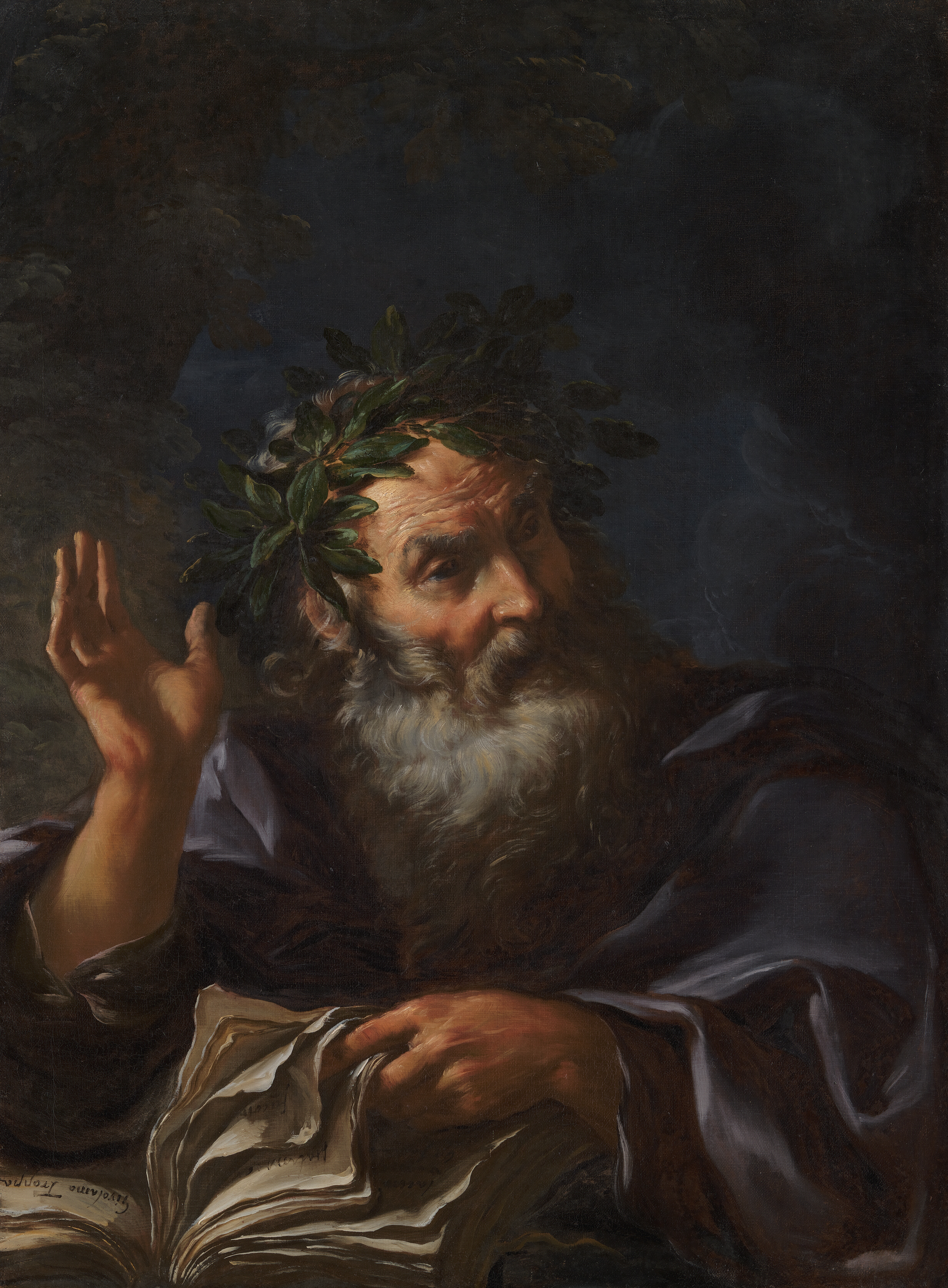
- Homer, Copenhagen, Statens Museum for Kunst
- Born: October 2, 1636; Rocchette, Torri in Sabina, Papal States
- Died: October 1711 (aged 74–75); Terni, Papal States
- Known for: Painting
- Movement: Baroque

Girolamo Troppa (2 October 1636 – October 1711) was an Italian painter of the Baroque period, depicting mainly sacred subjects. A follower of Carlo Maratta, he was active in Rome and Umbria.

== Biography ==
Though evidently an artist of some standing in late 17th-century Rome, with the title of ‘cavaliere’ and several documented pupils, little is now known of his life and work. His training, both from his teacher Lazzaro Baldi and at the Accademia di San Luca (where he was a pupil in 1664), was in the Carracci tradition. This is evident in the Adoration of the Shepherds (Dublin, National Gallery of Ireland). His style shows affinities with that of Carlo Maratta, but he was also interested in Giacinto Brandi, and still more so in Pier Francesco Mola and in Salvator Rosa, whose influence can be seen in such works with a romantic flavour as Virgil and Homer (c. 1668; Copenhagen, National Gallery of Denmark). The Flora in the Chigi Palace in Rome and the two canvases of scenes from the Life of St. Thecla at San Giuseppe in Ferrara also date from c. 1668.

Troppa painted for the church of San Giacomo delle Penitenti, in competition with the son of Giovanni Francesco Romanelli. Works attributed to Troppa are also found in Cesi, Narni, and Terni. He painted for the church of San Salvatore and the Oratory of San Sebastiano in his native Rocchette, and for the church of San Niccolò (1700) in San Torri in Sabina.

The artist’s later style shows him moving towards the Baroque, intensifying his relationship with Brandi and with the artists who developed Bernini’s later art, such as Giovanni Battista Gaulli. Troppa collaborated with the latter in the decoration of the oratory of Santa Marta in Rome (1672), producing two tondi representing Miracles of St. Martha. His later works in the church of Sant'Ambrogio e Carlo al Corso in Rome (1678) are similar in style and approach, as is a painting at Cittaducale (1692) and a banner at Torri in Sabina (1700). His much deteriorated frescoes (after 1710) in Sant'Agata in Trastevere are impossible to evaluate.

Troppa died in Terni in 1710.

== Selected works ==
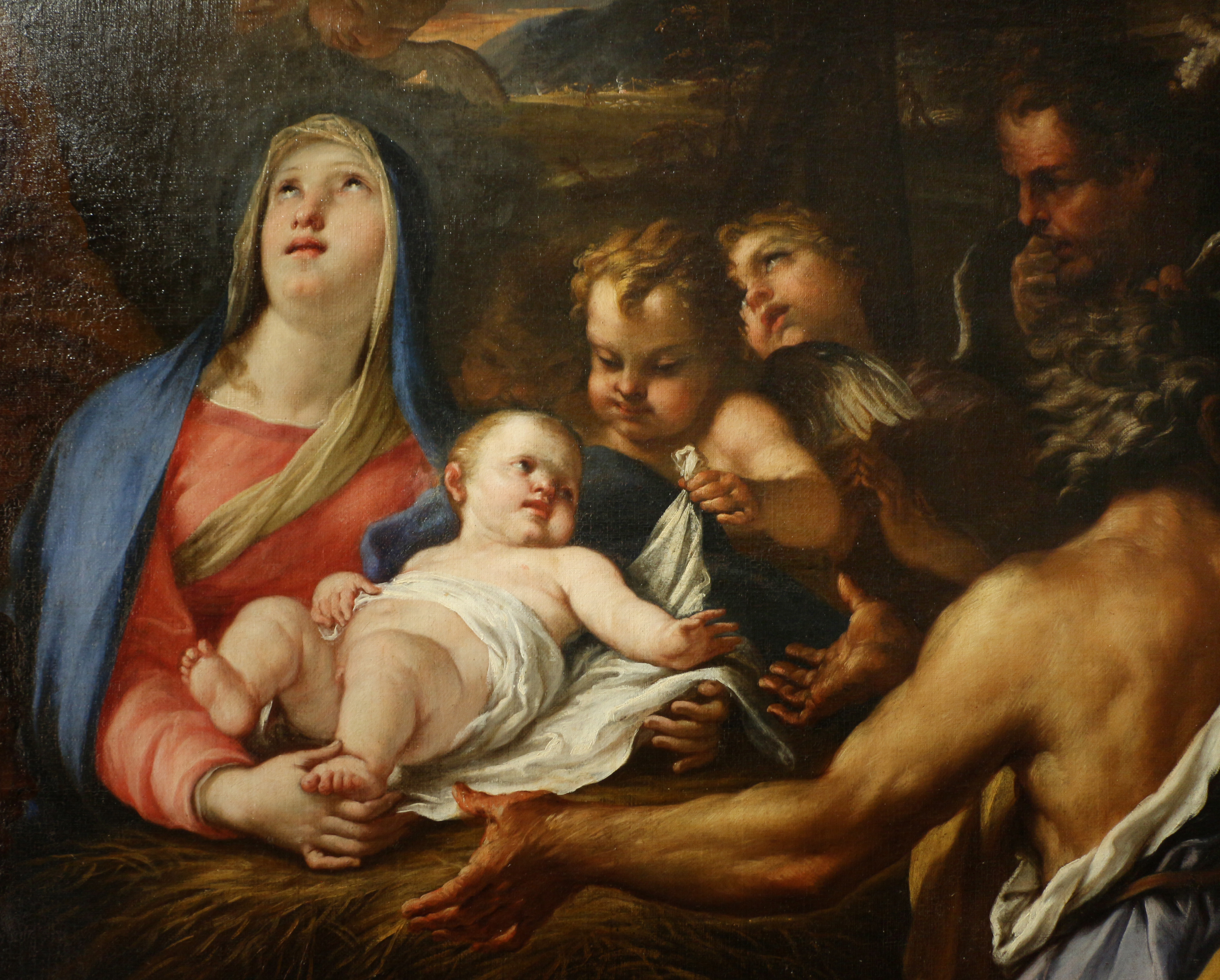
Adoration of the Shepherds (Detail), San Severino, Pinacoteca Tacchi-Venturi

- Agar ed Ismaele nel deserto salvati dall'Angelo, 1682-83.
- Homer, 1665-1668.
- Vergil, 1665-1668.
- Assunzione della Vergine, 1675.
- Trinità incorona la Madonna e santi, 1682.
- Madonna con bambino e Santi, 1678.
- L'elemosina di San Tommaso da Villanova, 1658-60.
- L'immagine della Madonna del latte sorretta dagli angeli, c. 1678.
- Madonna del Rosario, 1692.
- Madonna e i Santi Filippo e Gaetano, 1701.
- Pietà, 1680-82.
- Annunciazione, 1680-90.
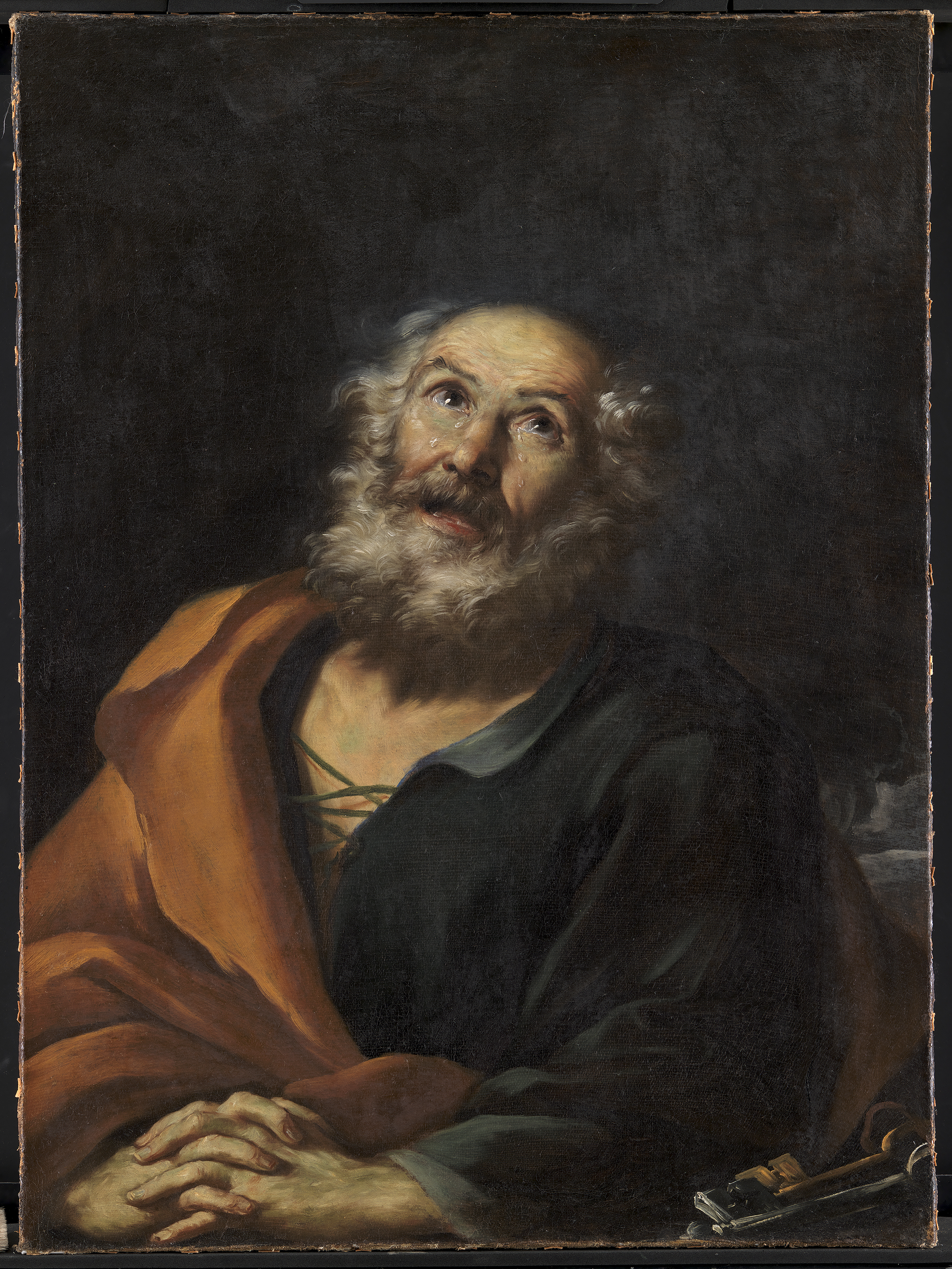
The Apostle Peter

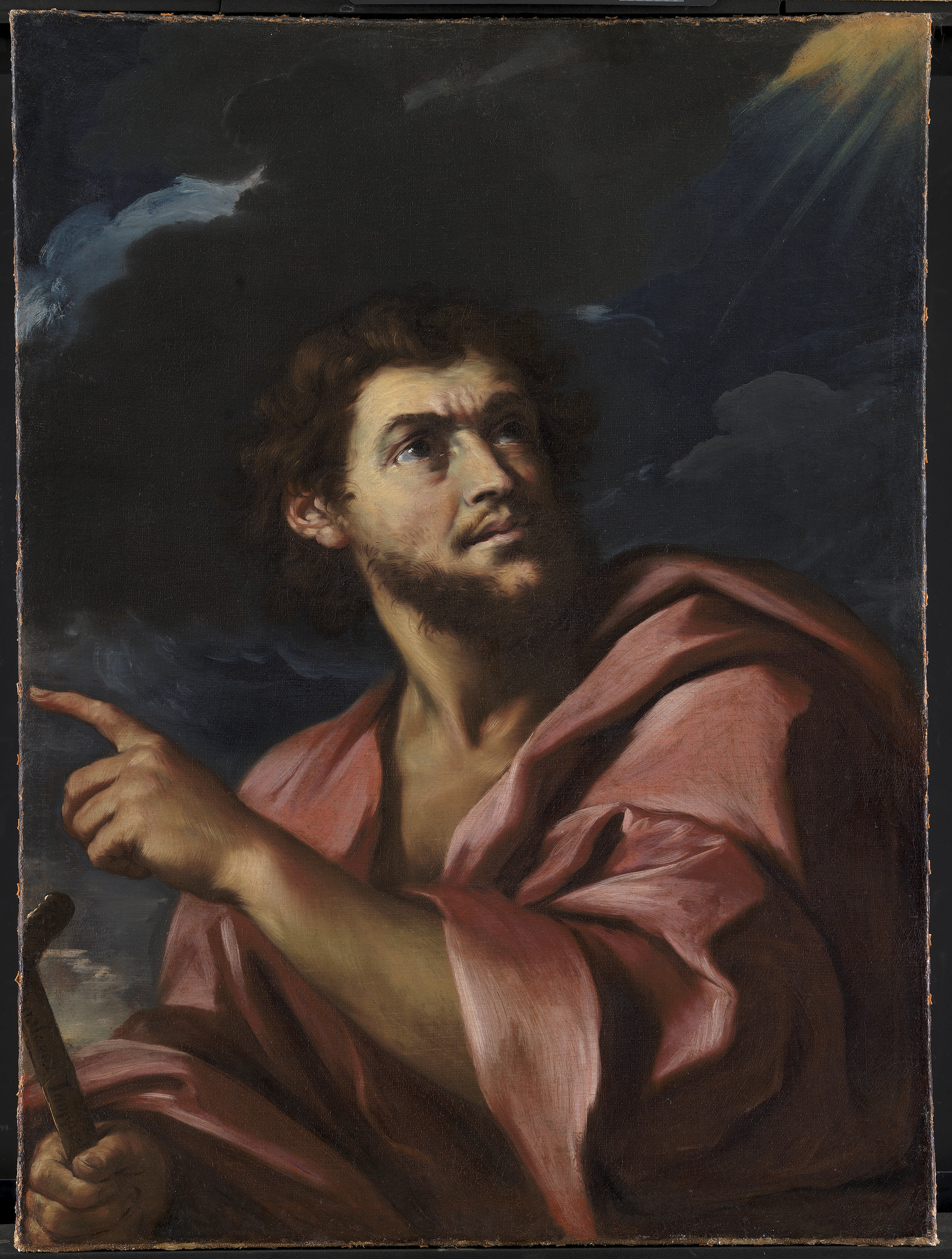
The Apostle John

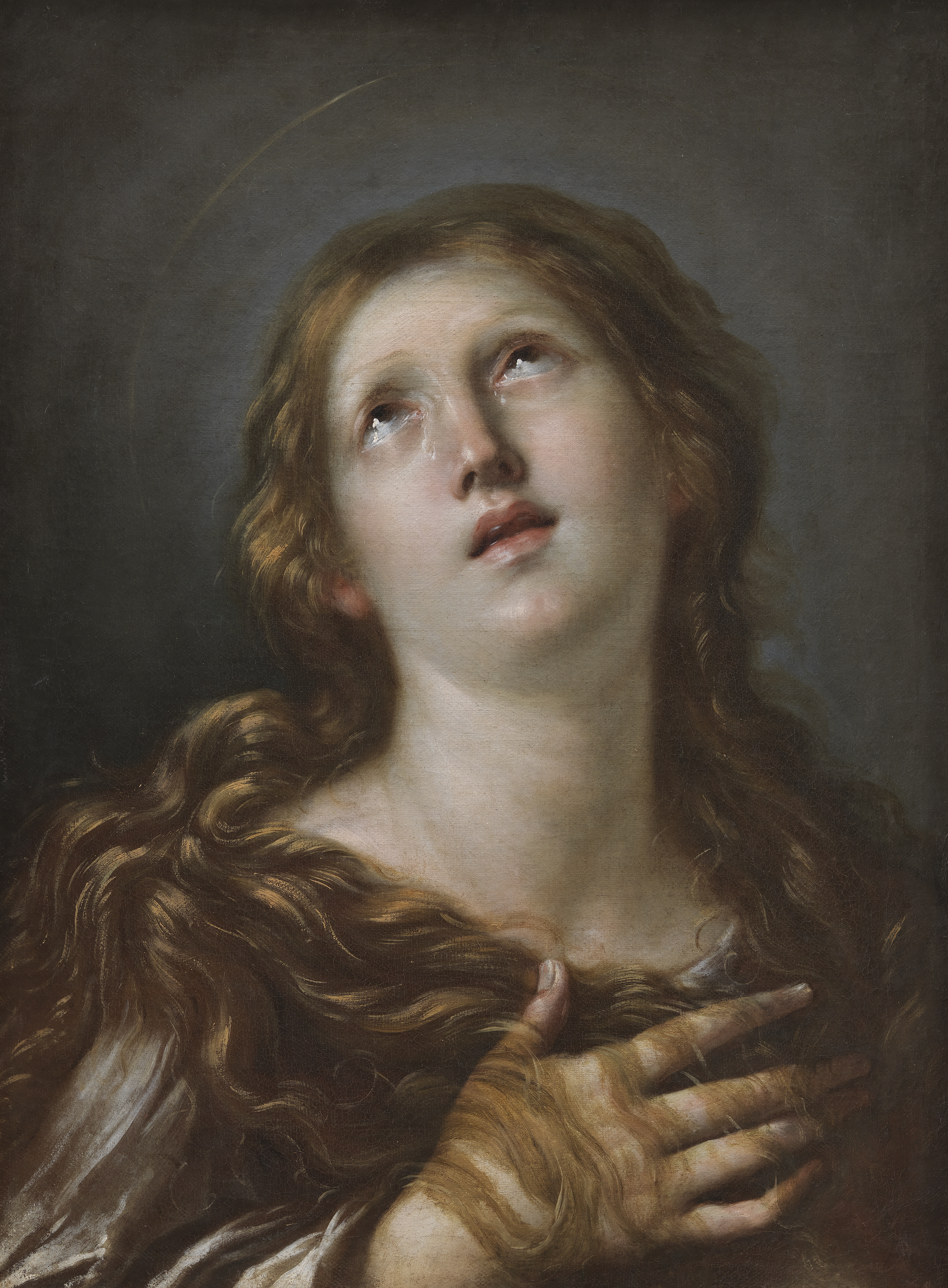
Mary Magdalene

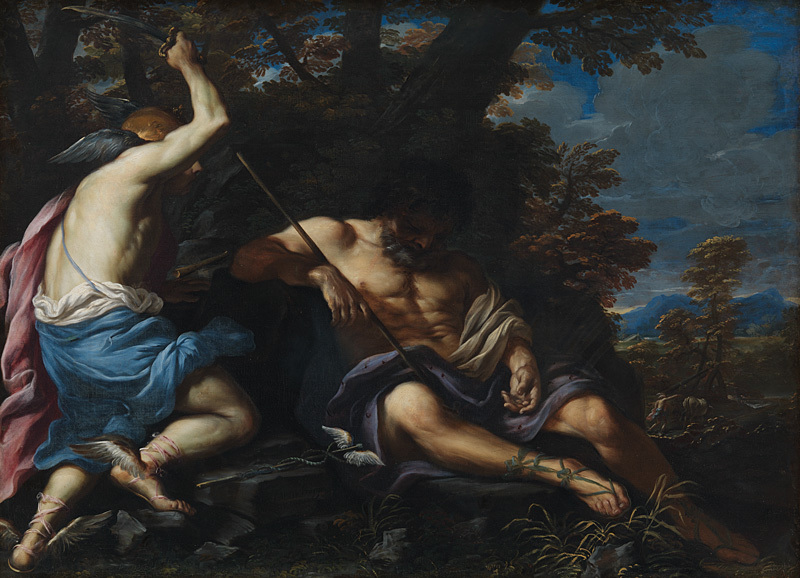
Mercury Killing Argus

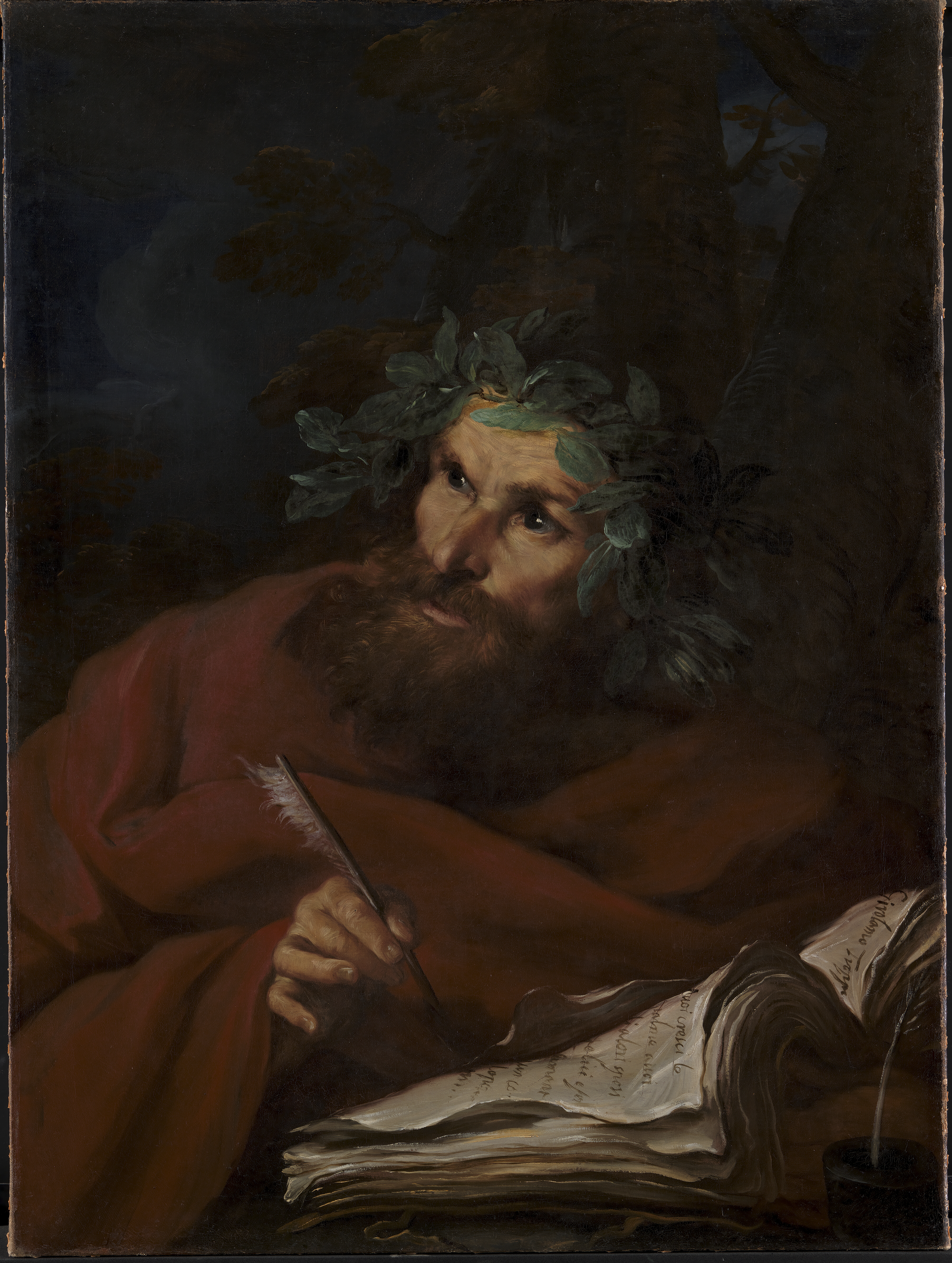
Vergil

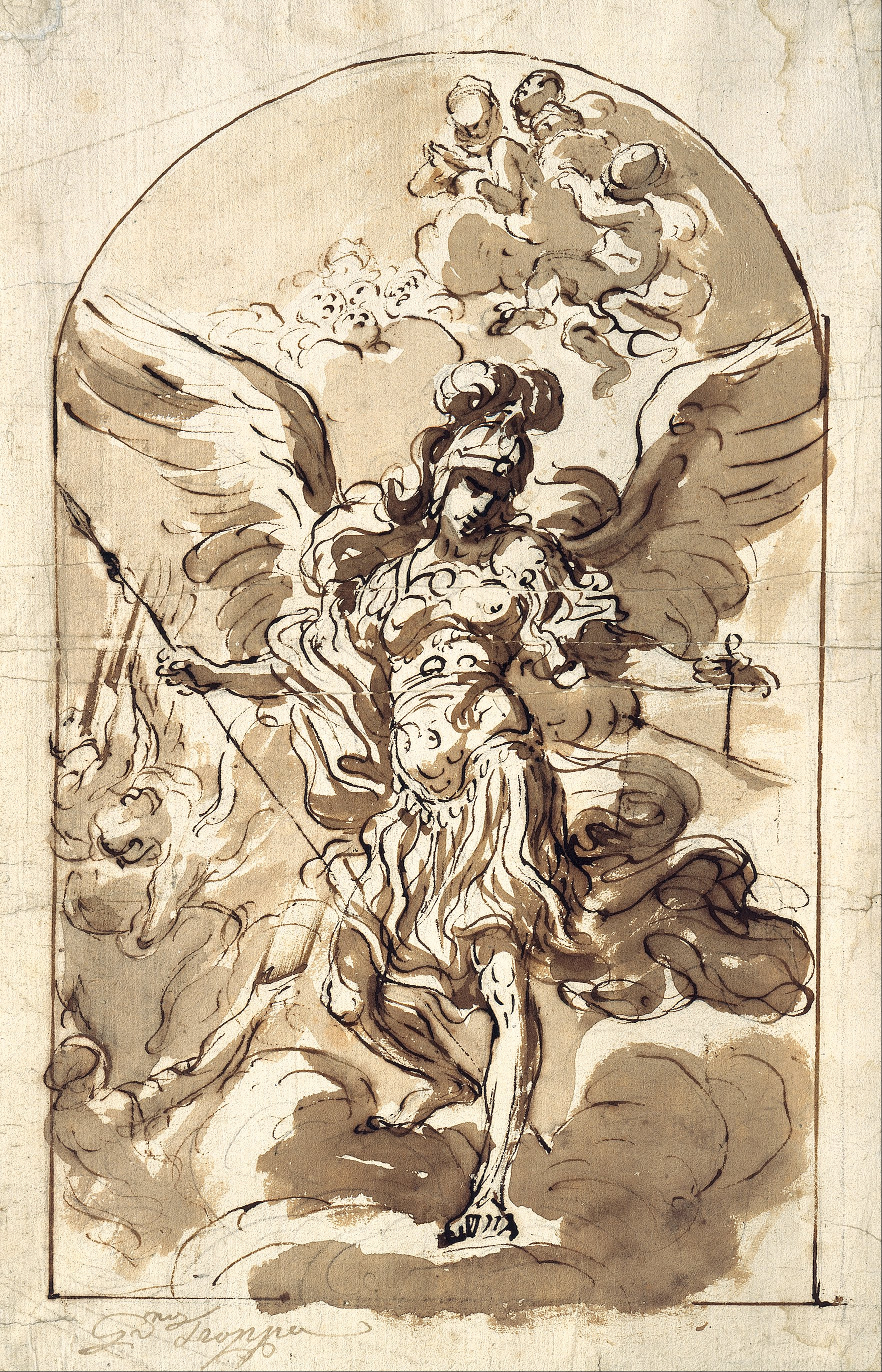
The Archangel Michael

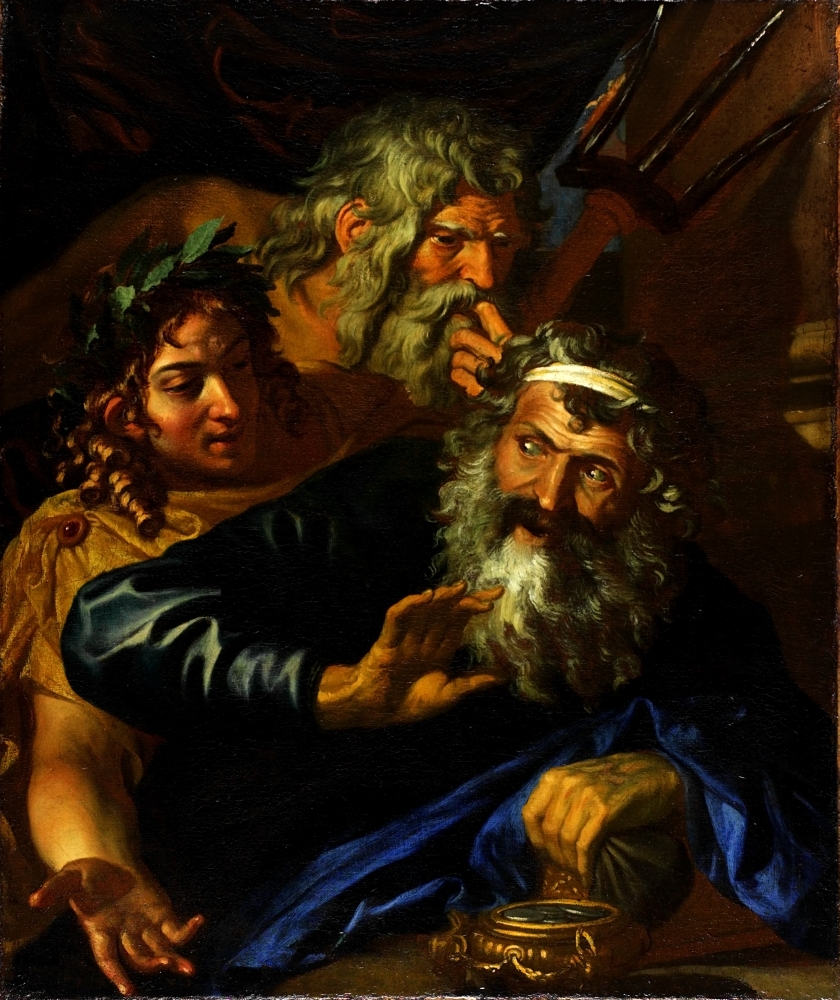
Laomedon Refusing Payment to Poseidon and Apollo

== Bibliography ==
- Bryan, Michael (1889). Walter Armstrong; Robert Edmund Graves (eds.). Dictionary of Painters and Engravers, Biographical and Critical. Vol. II L-Z. London: George Bell and Sons. p. 586.
