= Collevecchio =

- Comune
- Comune di Collevecchio
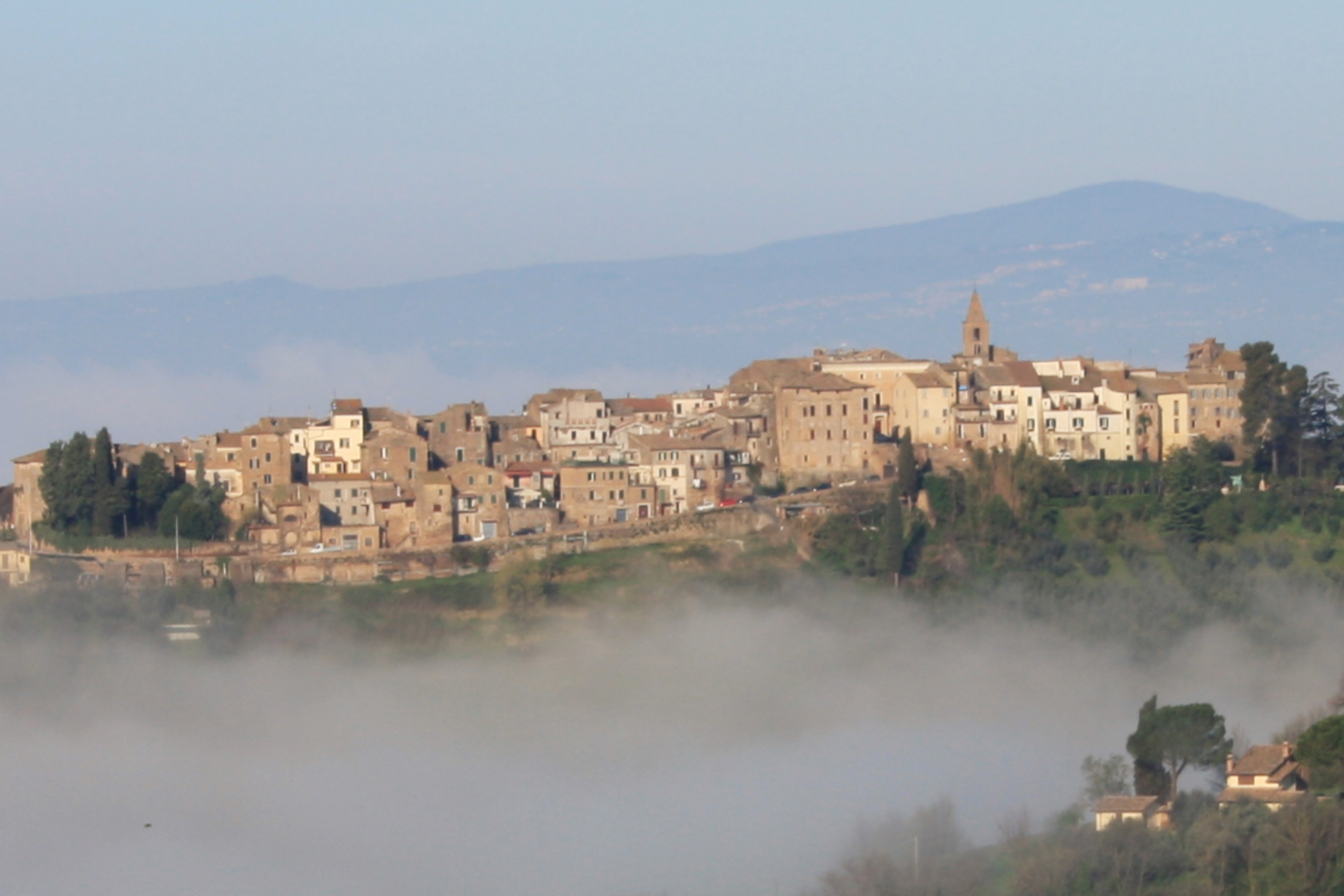
- View of Collevecchio

- Coat of arms

- Location within Italy Location within Lazio
- Coordinates: 42°20′N 12°33′E
- Country: Italy
- Region: Lazio
- Province: Rieti (RI)
- Frazioni: Poggio Sommavilla, Cicignano

Area
  - Total: 26.95 km^{2} (10.41 sq mi)
- Elevation: 245 m (804 ft)

Population (2010)
  - Total: 1,651
  - Density: 61.26/km^{2} (158.7/sq mi)
- Demonym: Collevecchiani
- Time zone: UTC+1 (CET)
  - Summer (DST): UTC+2 (CEST)
- Postal code: 02042
- Dialing code: 0765
- Website: Official website

Collevecchio (local dialect: Colevecchiu) is a comune (municipality) in the province of Rieti in the Italian region of Latium.

== Territory ==
Collevecchio borders the following Comuni: Civita Castellana, Magliano Sabina, Montebuono, Ponzano Romano, Stimigliano, Tarano. The frazione of Poggio Sommavilla is home to a prehistoric and arcaic archaeological site of Poggio Sommavilla on Tiber Valley with center acropolis and a necropolis.

The economy is based on agriculture (olive, wine) and animal husbandry (cattle and goats).

== People from Collevecchio ==
- Simonetta da Collevecchio
