= Palazzo baronale =

Fortified palace in Archi, Italy

Coordinates: 42.0915°N 14.3810°E

Baronial Palace
- Palazzo baronale
- Archi
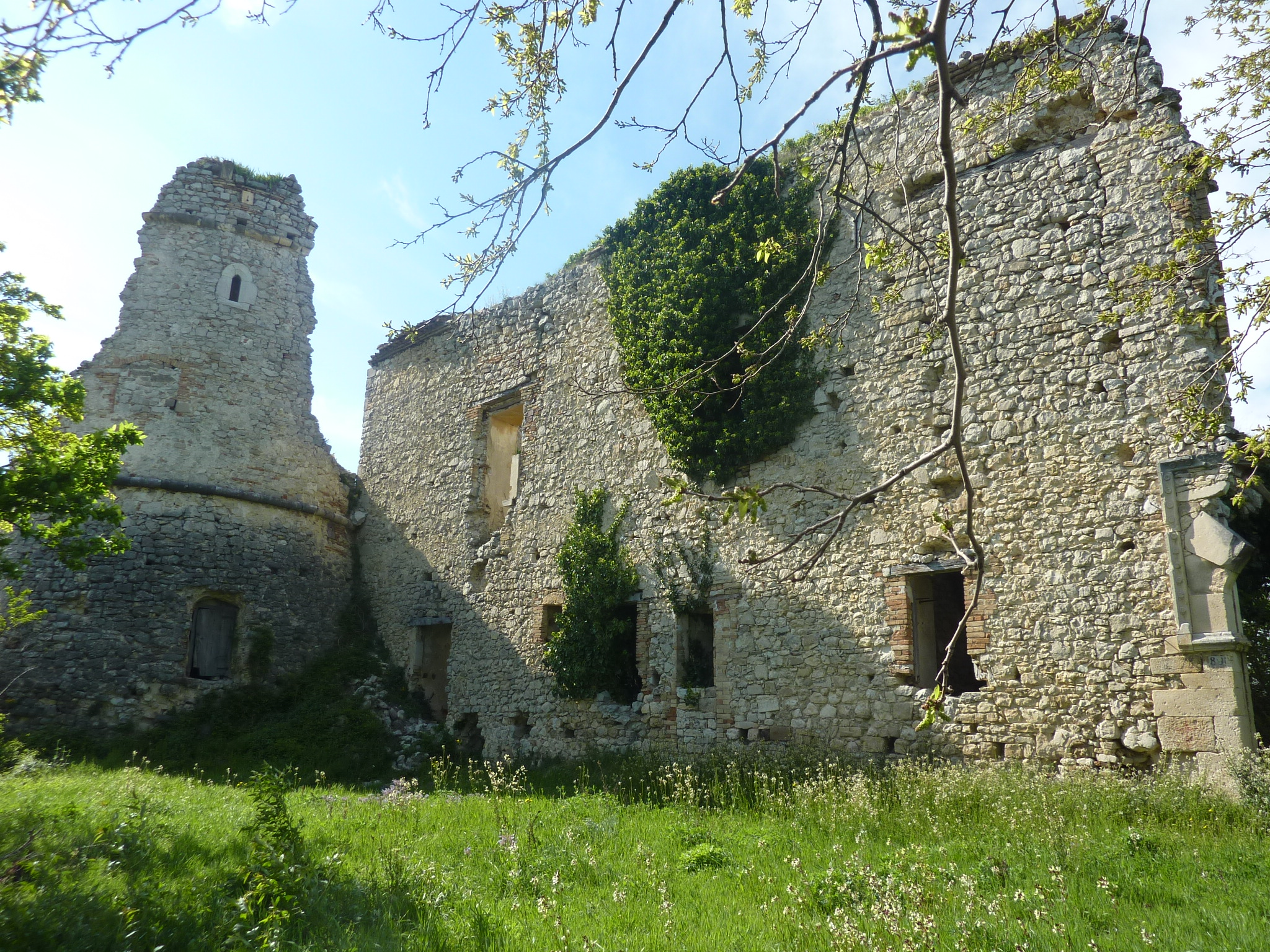
- Fortified Palace in Archi

Site information
- Type: Castle

Location

Site history
- Built: 11th century

Palazzo baronale (Italian for Baronial Palace) is a fortified palace in Archi, Province of Chieti (Abruzzo).

== History ==
The first mention of the castle dates back to the 11th century, when the settlement of Fara Adami was documented, located along the Sangro river and governed by the gastald Raniero and a priest named Adamo. However, the first official document confirming its existence in 1075 is the Catalogus Baronum, compiled by King Roger II of Sicily.

In the 15th century, Archi was a fief of the Caldora family, with the castle subsequently being owned by Jacopo, Antonio, and his son Restaino Caldora.

After various vicissitudes of feudal lords, in 1559, Archi and its castle passed to Martino di Segua. Several notarial documents attest that Martino repeatedly restored some wings of the castle. The work was carried out by master Antonio Malerba. However, in 1563, Martino had to auction the castle to pay off his debts.

Documents from the 17th century report that in 1644, Giovanni Battista Marino was involved in legal issues to inherit the castle.

It then belonged to various feudal lords, the last of whom were the Aldimari of Bomba, who held it until the abolition of feudalism in 1806.

Lastly, it was acquired by the Lannutti family, who lived there until the German seizure in 1943. The Nazis used the castle as a military outpost overlooking the Val di Sangro to monitor the arrival of Allied troops from Perano. Shortly before their retreat to the Alto Sangro mountains, the Nazis damaged and mined the castle, reducing it to its current ruinous state.

== Architecture ==
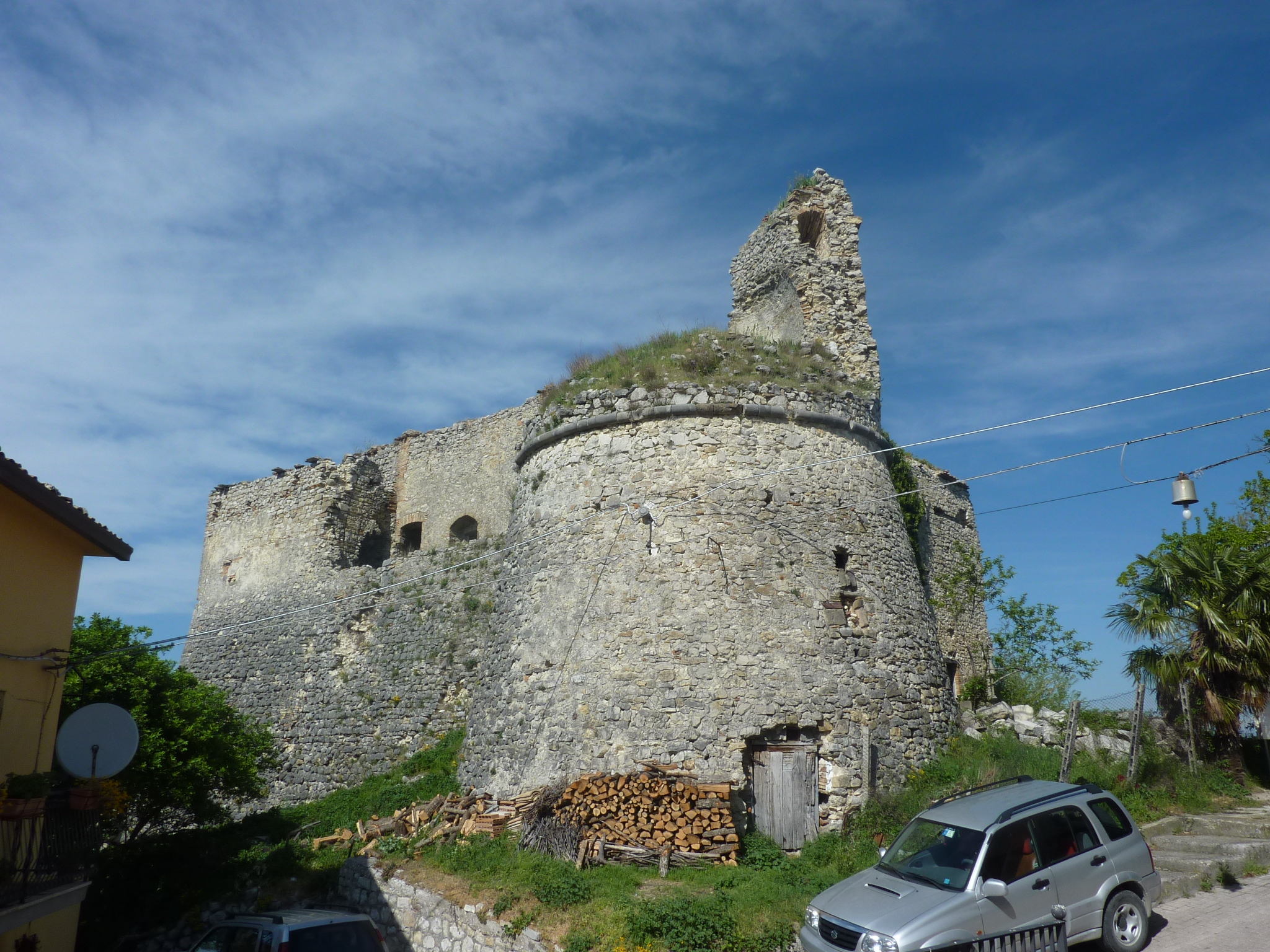
Remains of the circular tower

The original layout was quadrangular, with two main towers on the sloped walls, located at the southwest and southeast corners. The first tower had a circular plan, still partly visible, with a diameter of 7.5m, and the other was square, with a circular base. The north side featured a bastioned earthwork, which completely collapsed due to the destruction caused by the Nazis; it is now occupied by the municipal radio-TV antenna. The chemin de ronde was supported by a truncated-conical masonry wall, while the northeast side was reinforced by a cylindrical structure. The facades on the east and west sides were fortified with original buildings against the curtain wall, enhancing the fortification on the landslide-prone hill and creating a sort of double wall defense against assaults.

The outer perimeter still shows various loopholes for the use of arquebuses and cannons; it likely did not have a moat, given the site's topography. The central block, now missing, used as a noble residence, measured 40x34m and featured a courtyard of 17x13m with a well and a cistern. The castle now has only some horizontal structures remaining, such as groin vaults or barrel vaults in brickwork, as well as a wooden flat ceiling with beams; a part of the Durazzesco-style arched portal remains, corresponding to the hallway, made of limestone blocks, and original monofora windows are found along the internal path, between the first and second levels of the residential palace.

The outer masonry is composed of river pebbles, brick, and hill stone, without alterations or tampering, indicating that the castle was built as a single block, without various extensions, except for the transformation of the inner building into a noble residence. Unfortunately, the barbaric destruction by the Nazis resulted in the loss of the entire interior of the structure, visible only in historical pre-war photographs along with the castle's layout. The southwest wall, facing the town from the Occidentale and Palazzo streets, still stands, along with the ruins of the base of the southeast square tower, and the southwest cylindrical tower, except for its upper part, which is half-destroyed.

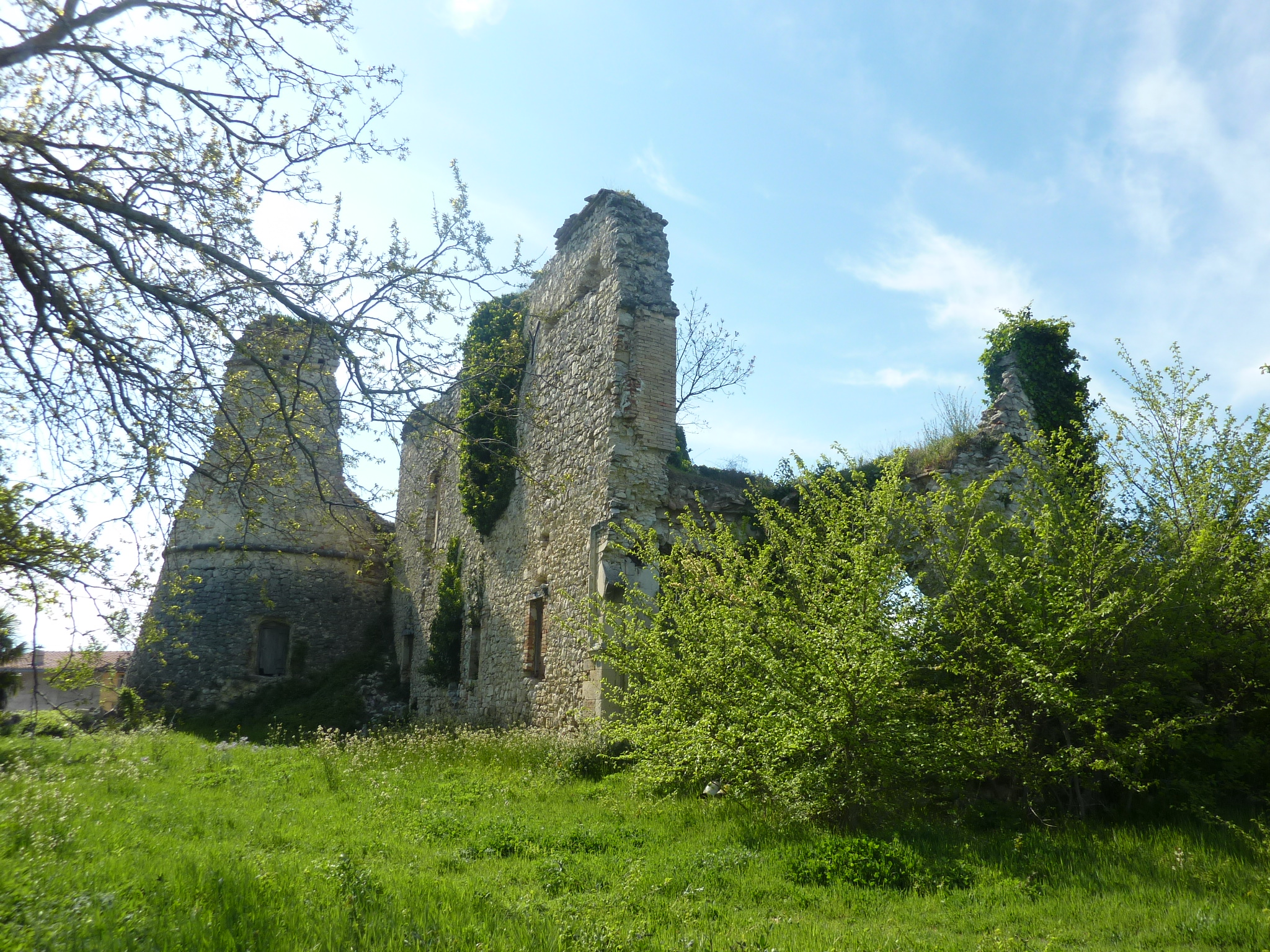
Remains of the main facade of the castle

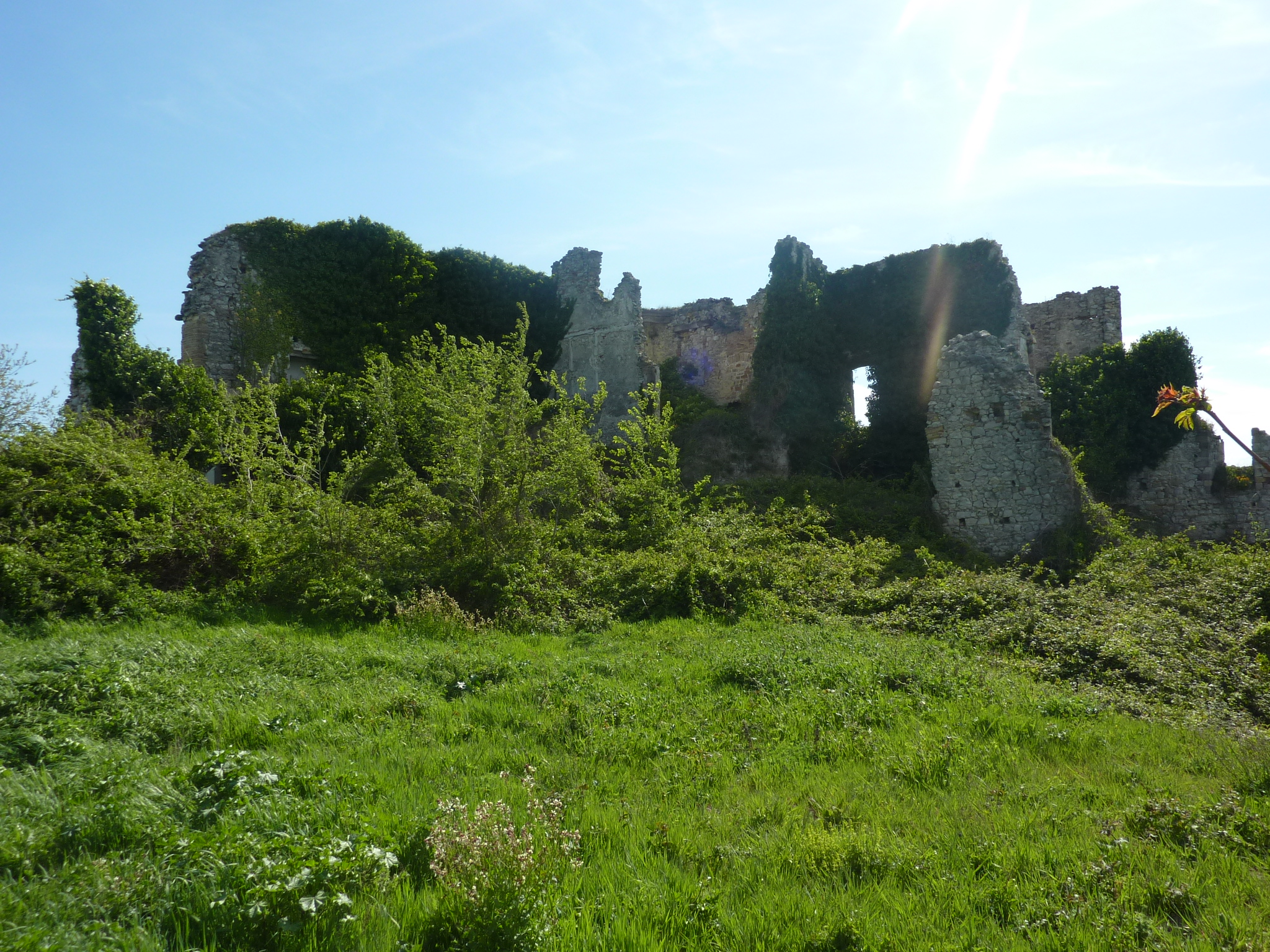
Castle walls

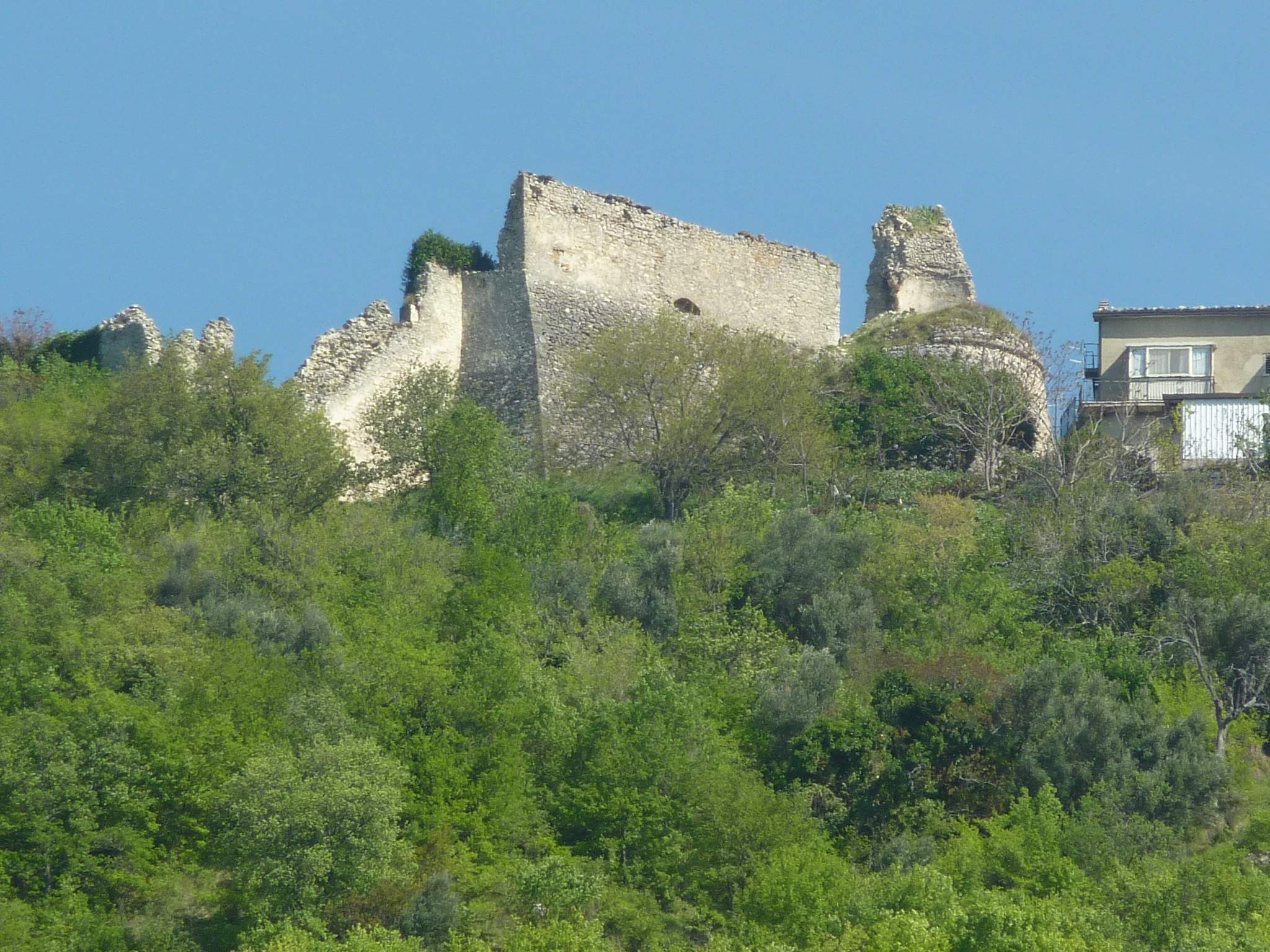
View of the castle
