= Filacciano =

- Comune
- Comune di Filacciano
- Coat of arms

- Location within Italy Location within Lazio
- Coordinates: 42°15′N 12°35′E
- Country: Italy
- Region: Lazio
- Metropolitan city: Rome (RM)

Government
  - Mayor: Giuseppe Gemma

Area
  - Total: 5.66 km^{2} (2.19 sq mi)
- Elevation: 197 m (646 ft)

Population (31 July 2017)
  - Total: 453
  - Density: 80.0/km^{2} (207/sq mi)
- Time zone: UTC+1 (CET)
  - Summer (DST): UTC+2 (CEST)
- Postal code: 00060
- Dialing code: 0765
- Website: Official website

Filacciano is a comune (municipality) in the Metropolitan City of Rome in the Italian region of Latium, located about 40 kilometres (25 mi) north of Rome.

== Infrastructure and transport ==
=== Roads ===
- SP 20 / a, which connects Filacciano to Nazzano and Ponzano.

The municipal territory, for a short stretch, is also crossed by the Autostrada A1.
