= Torri in Sabina =

- Comune
- Comune di Torri in Sabina
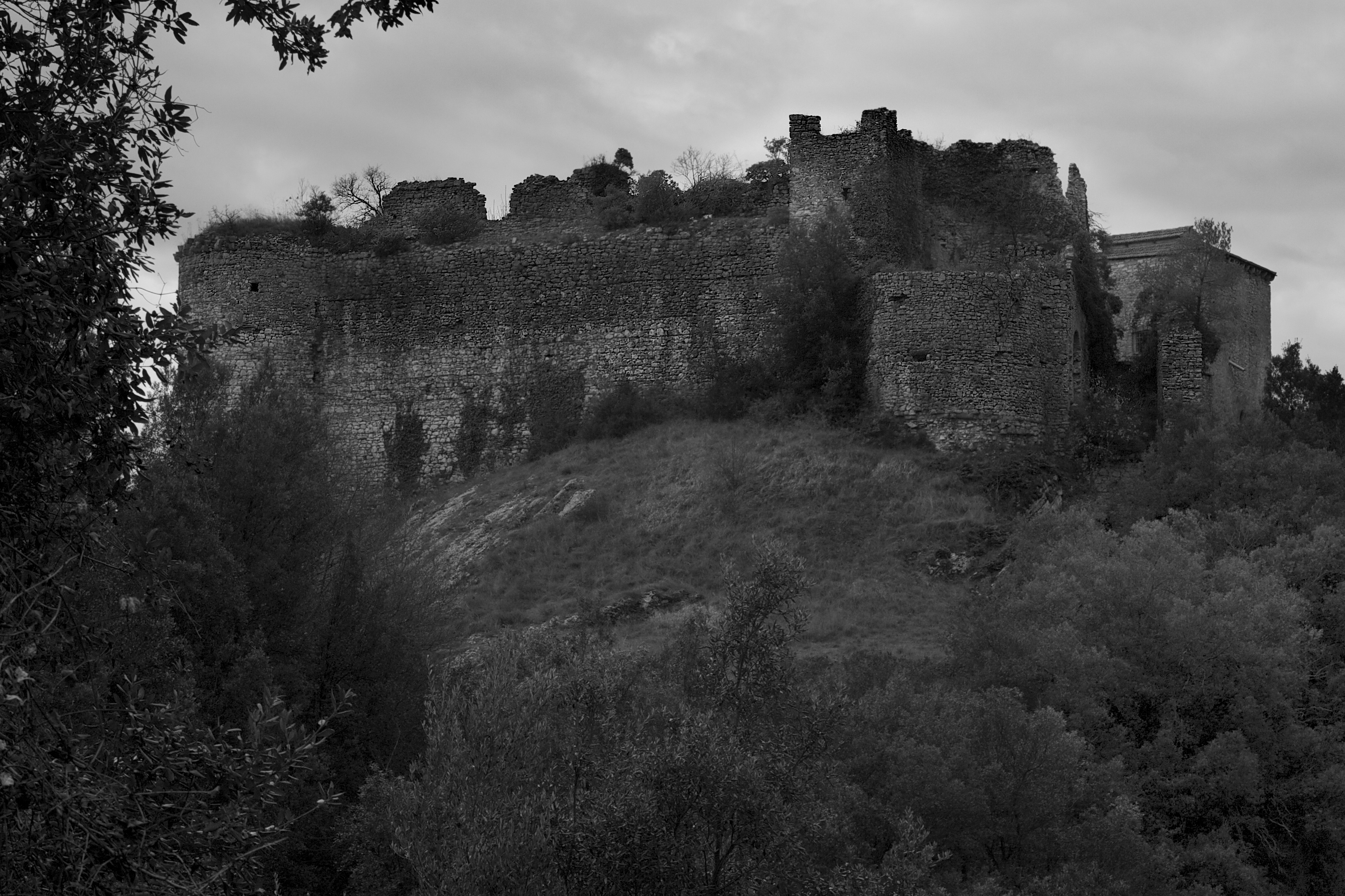
- Medieval remains in the frazione of Rocchette

- Coat of arms

- Location within Italy Location within Lazio
- Coordinates: 42°21′N 12°38′E
- Country: Italy
- Region: Lazio
- Province: Rieti (RI)

Government
  - Mayor: Michele Concezzi

Area
  - Total: 26.1 km^{2} (10.1 sq mi)
- Elevation: 275 m (902 ft)

Population (31 December 2010)
  - Total: 1,310
  - Density: 50.2/km^{2} (130/sq mi)
- Time zone: UTC+1 (CET)
  - Summer (DST): UTC+2 (CEST)
- Postal code: 02049
- Dialing code: 0765
- Website: Official website

Torri in Sabina is a comune (municipality) in the Province of Rieti in the Italian region of Latium, located about 50 kilometres (31 mi) north of Rome and about 20 kilometres (12 mi) southwest of Rieti. Located on a ridge of the Monti Sabini, it is part of the Sabina traditional region.

Sights include the church of Santa Maria della Lode a Vescovìo, built in the 9th century and modified in the 12th century to the current Romanesque appearance. The interior has a single nave and houses a 13th-14th century fresco of the Universal Judgement and scenes from the Old and New Testament. The bell tower dates from the 10th-11th century, and was built using remains from the ancient Roman town of Forum Novum.
