= Veduta =

Genre of large-scale paintings or prints of a cityscape or other vista

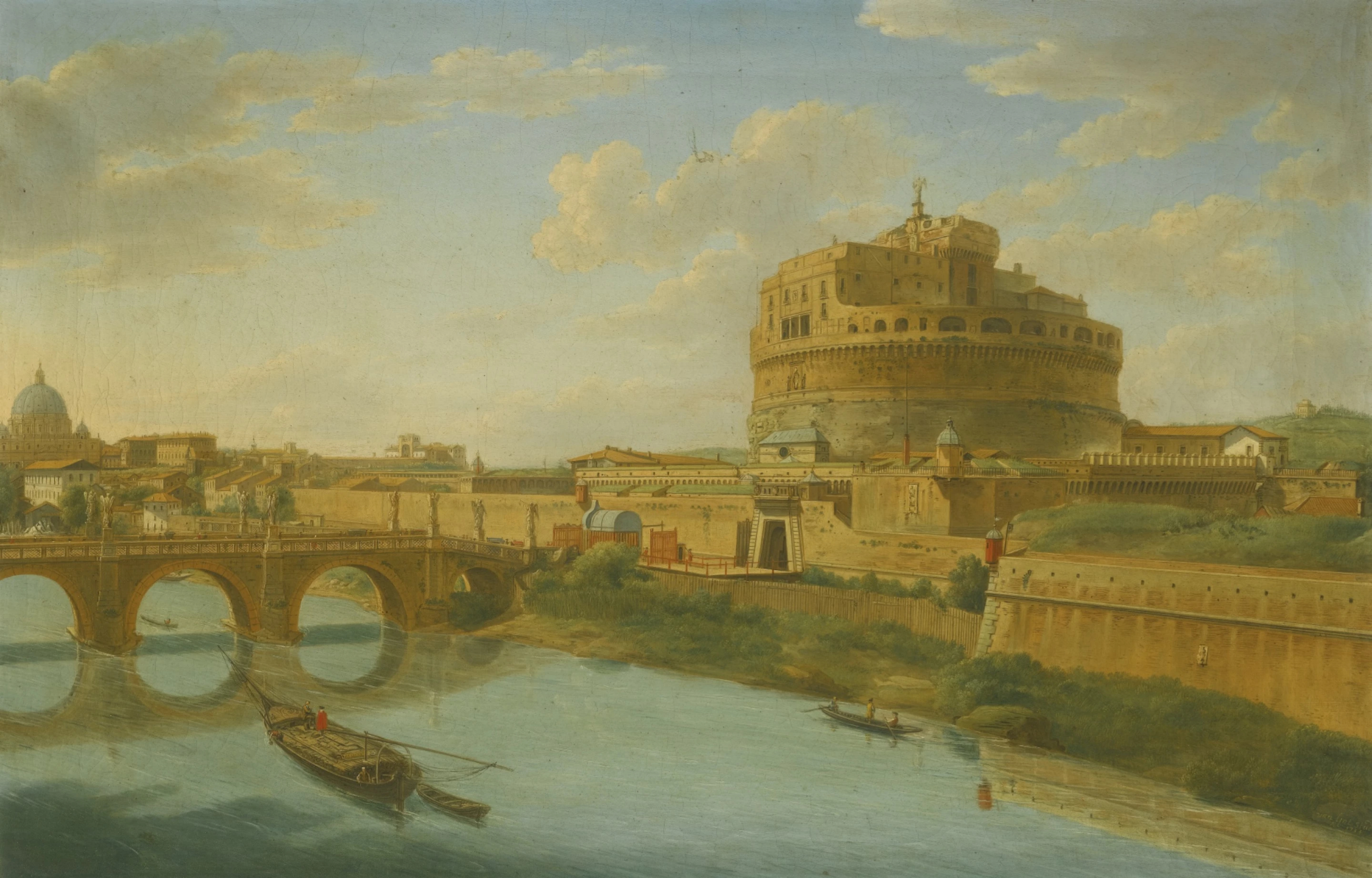
Rome, a view of the Tiber, Castel Sant'Angelo, Ponte Sant'Angelo, Saint Peter's Basilica by Hendrik Frans van Lint; 1734, oil on canvas, 47 × 72 cm, private collection

A veduta (Italian for 'view'; pl. vedute) is a highly detailed, usually large-scale painting or, more often, print of a cityscape or some other vista. The painters of vedute are referred to as vedutisti.

== Origins ==
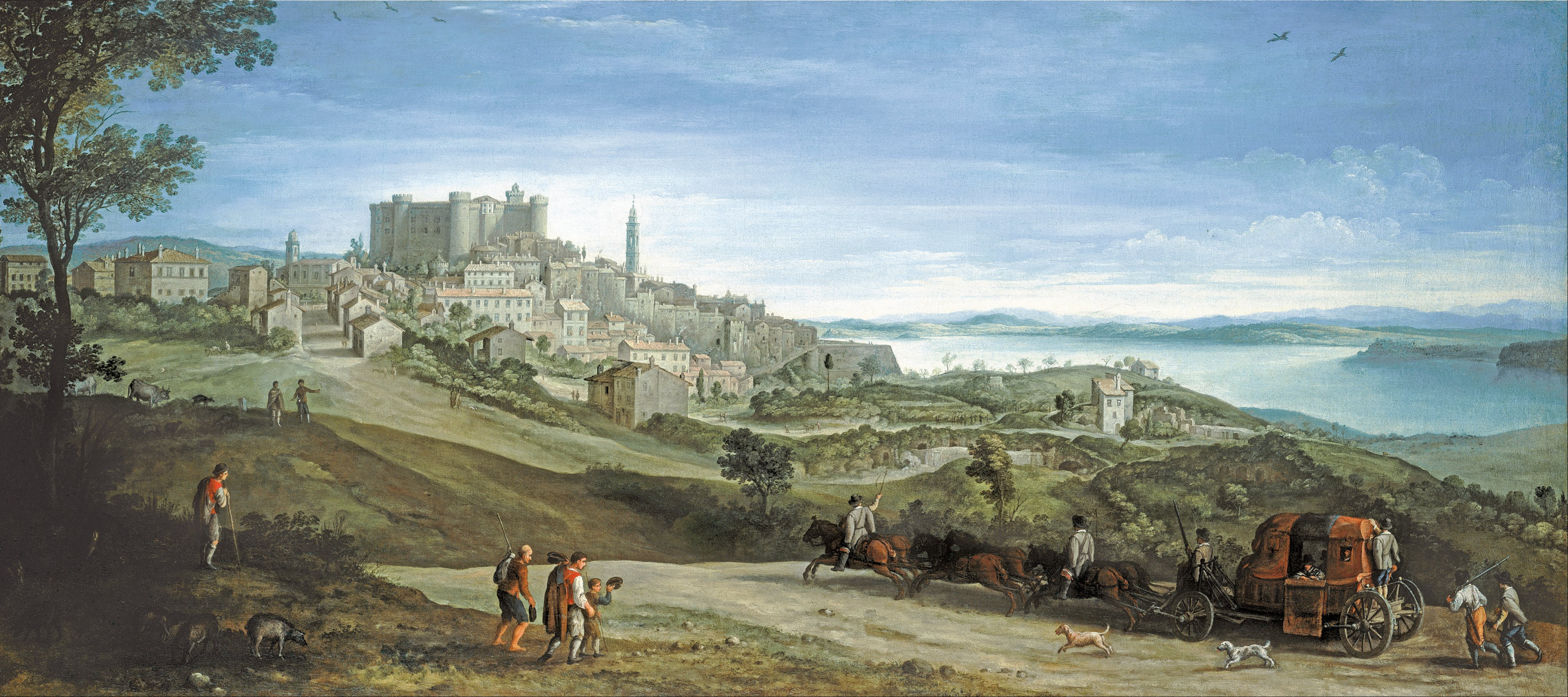
View of Bracciano by Paul Bril; early 1620s, oil on canvas, 75 × 164 cm, Art Gallery of South Australia.

This genre of landscape originated in Flanders, where artists such as Paul Bril painted veduta as early as the 16th century. In the 17th century, Dutch painters made a specialty of detailed and accurate recognizable city and landscapes that appealed to the sense of local pride of the wealthy Dutch middle class. An archetypal example is Johannes Vermeer's View of Delft. The Ghent architect, draughtsman and engraver Lieven Cruyl (1640–1720) contributed to the development of the veduta during his residence in Rome in the late 17th century. Cruyl's drawings reproduce the topographical aspects of the urban landscape.

== 18th century ==
As the itinerary of the Grand Tour became somewhat standardized, veduta of familiar scenes like the Roman Forum or the Grand Canal recalled early ventures to the Continent for aristocratic Englishmen. By the mid-18th century, Venice became renowned as the centre of the vedutisti. The genre was pioneered by Luca Carlevarijs, and its greatest practitioners belonged to the Canal and Guardi families of Venice. Some of them went to work as painters in major capitals of Europe, e.g., Canaletto in London and his nephew Bernardo Bellotto in Dresden and Warsaw.

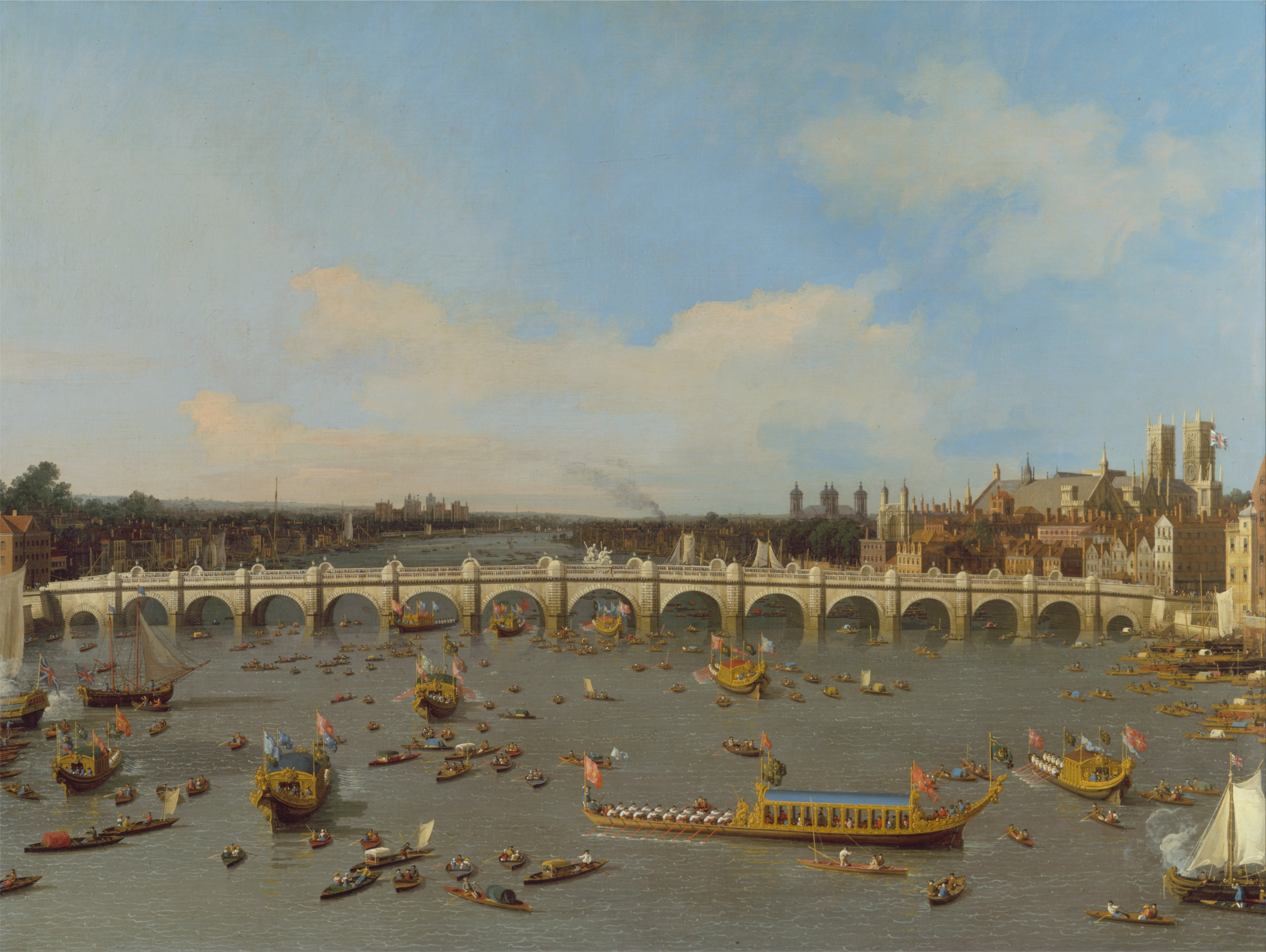
Westminster Bridge, with the Lord Mayor's Procession on the Thames by Canaletto, 1747

In other parts of 18th-century Italy, idiosyncratic varieties of the genre evolved. Giovanni Paolo Pannini was the first veduta artist to concentrate on painting ruins. The Dutch painter Gaspar van Wittel (who worked in Rome, where he was known as Vanvitelli) and others painted veduta esatta (Italian for 'exact view') which was a topographically accurate depiction of a cityscape or monument and in which the human and animal figures played a secondary role. His collaborators included Hendrik Frans van Lint, who would become one of the leading vedute painters in the first half of the 18th century. Through his more realistic representation in the vedute he executed at the end of the 17th century and beginning of the 18th century, the Flemish painter Jan Frans van Bloemen anticipated developments during the 18th century, when there was a shift away from the classically oriented Roman landscapes of French vedute painters in Rome such as Gaspard Dughet.

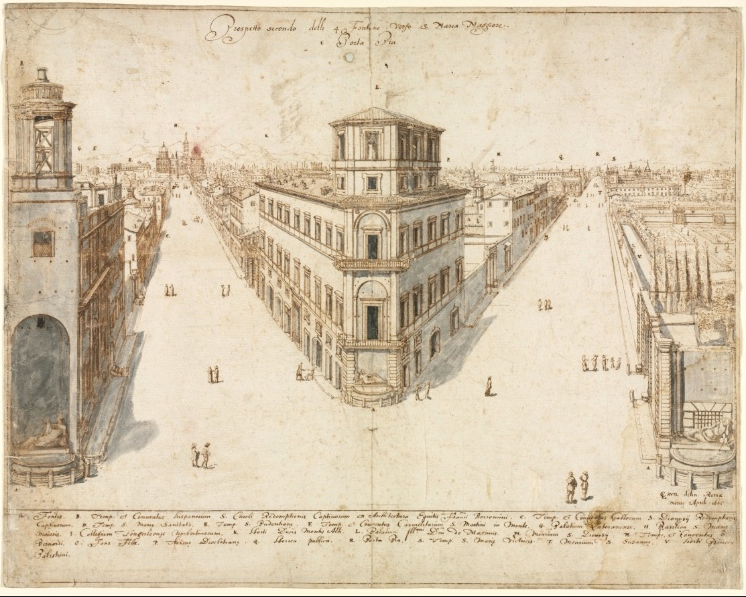
The Quattro Fontane Looking Toward Santa Maria Maggiore by Lieven Cruyl

In later developments of the vedute, Pannini's veduta morphed into the scenes partly or completely imaginary elements, known as capricci and veduta ideate or veduta di fantasia. Giambattista Piranesi was the foremost master of vedute ideate etchings. His topographical series, Vedute di Roma, went through many printings.

== 19th century ==
In the later 19th century, more personal "impressions" of cityscapes replaced the desire for topographical accuracy, which was satisfied instead by painted, and later photographed, panoramas. There was a sizeable community of émigré artists active in Venice, such as Antonietta Brandeis, the Spanish painters Martín Rico y Ortega, Mariano Fortuny, Antonio Reyna Manescau and Rafael Senet and the Peruvian painter Federico del Campo. These artists responded to the large international market for their city views of Venice, and they made such big names for themselves through this genre that they painted nothing but Italian views.

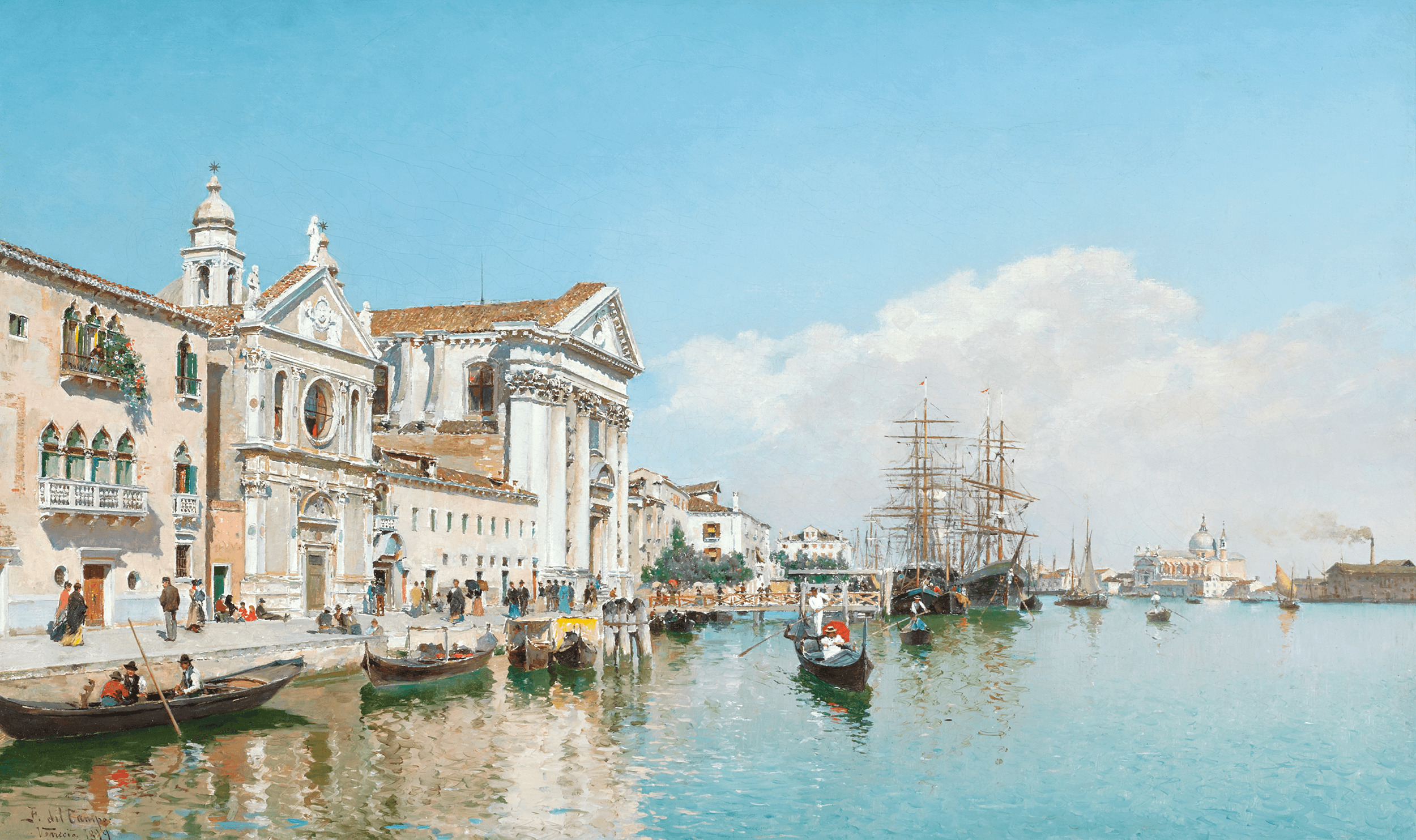
Santa Maria del Rosario in Venice by Federico del Campo, 1899

Demand for Federico del Campo's views, particularly from English tourists, was so strong that he painted several views multiple times, and the same can be said of Reyna Manescau, who repeated the same urban landscapes in many occasions with minimal variations.

== See also ==
- Capriccio (art)
- Cityscape
