= Bracciano =

Painting by Paul Bril

- Comune
- Comune di Bracciano
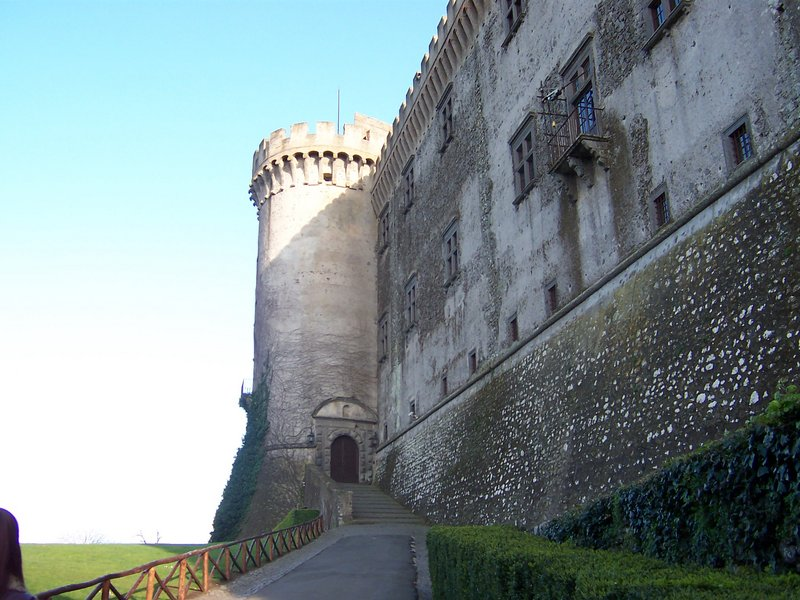
- A view of the Castello Orsini-Odescalchi

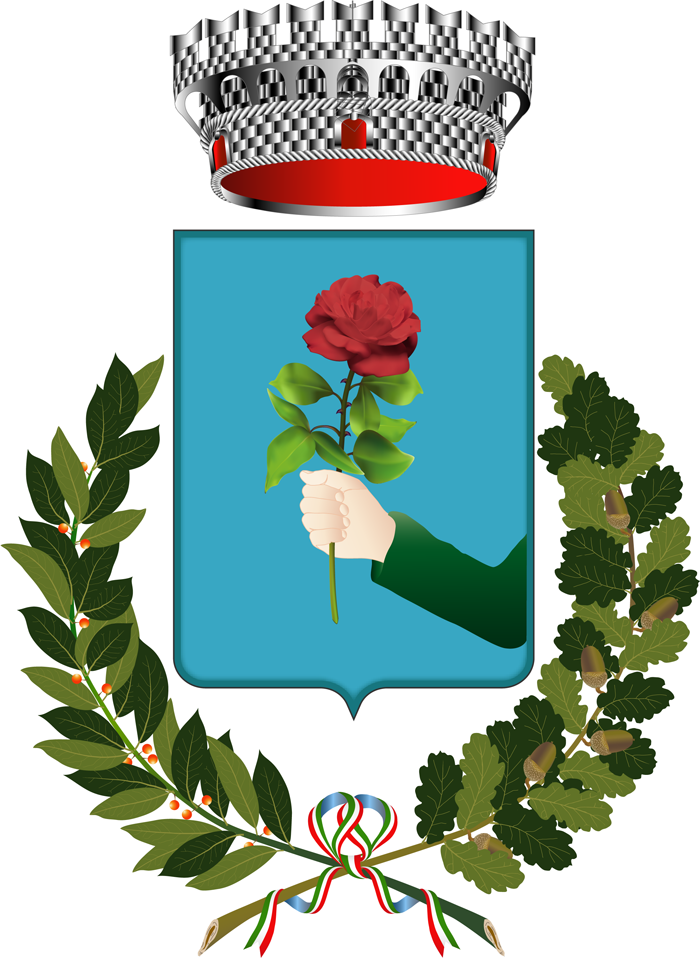
- Coat of arms

- Location within Italy Location within Lazio
- Coordinates: 42°06′N 12°11′E
- Country: Italy
- Region: Lazio
- Metropolitan city: Rome (RM)
- Frazioni: Castel Giuliano, Pisciarelli, Sambuco, Vicarello, Vigna di Valle

Government
  - Mayor: Marco Crocicchi

Area
  - Total: 143.06 km^{2} (55.24 sq mi)
- Elevation: 280 m (920 ft)

Population (1 January 2024)
  - Total: 18,516
  - Density: 129.43/km^{2} (335.22/sq mi)
- Demonym: Braccianesi
- Time zone: UTC+1 (CET)
  - Summer (DST): UTC+2 (CEST)
- Postal code: 00062
- Dialing code: 06
- Patron saint: St. Sebastian
- Saint day: January 20
- Website: Official website

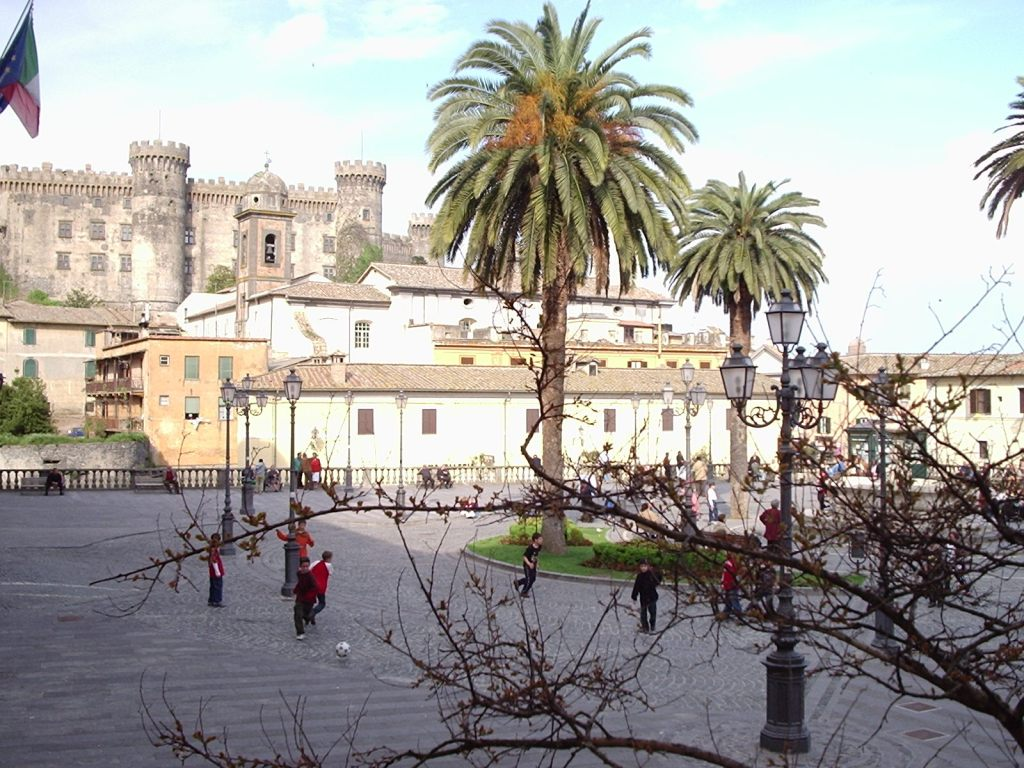
The historic center of Bracciano

Bracciano is a small town in the Italian region of Lazio, 30 kilometres (19 miles) northwest of Rome. The town is famous for its volcanic lake (Lake Bracciano or "Sabatino", the eighth largest lake in Italy) and for a particularly well-preserved medieval castle Castello Orsini-Odescalchi. The lake is widely used for sailing and is popular with tourists; the castle has hosted a number of events, especially weddings of actors and singers.

The town is served by an urban railway (Line FR3) which connects it with Rome (stations of Ostiense and Valle Aurelia) in about 55 minutes. Close to it lie the two medieval towns of Anguillara Sabazia and Trevignano Romano.

== Geography ==
Bracciano's territory lies on the western edge of the Sabatine Hills, a low volcanic hills range encircling Lake Bracciano.

== History ==
View of Bracciano
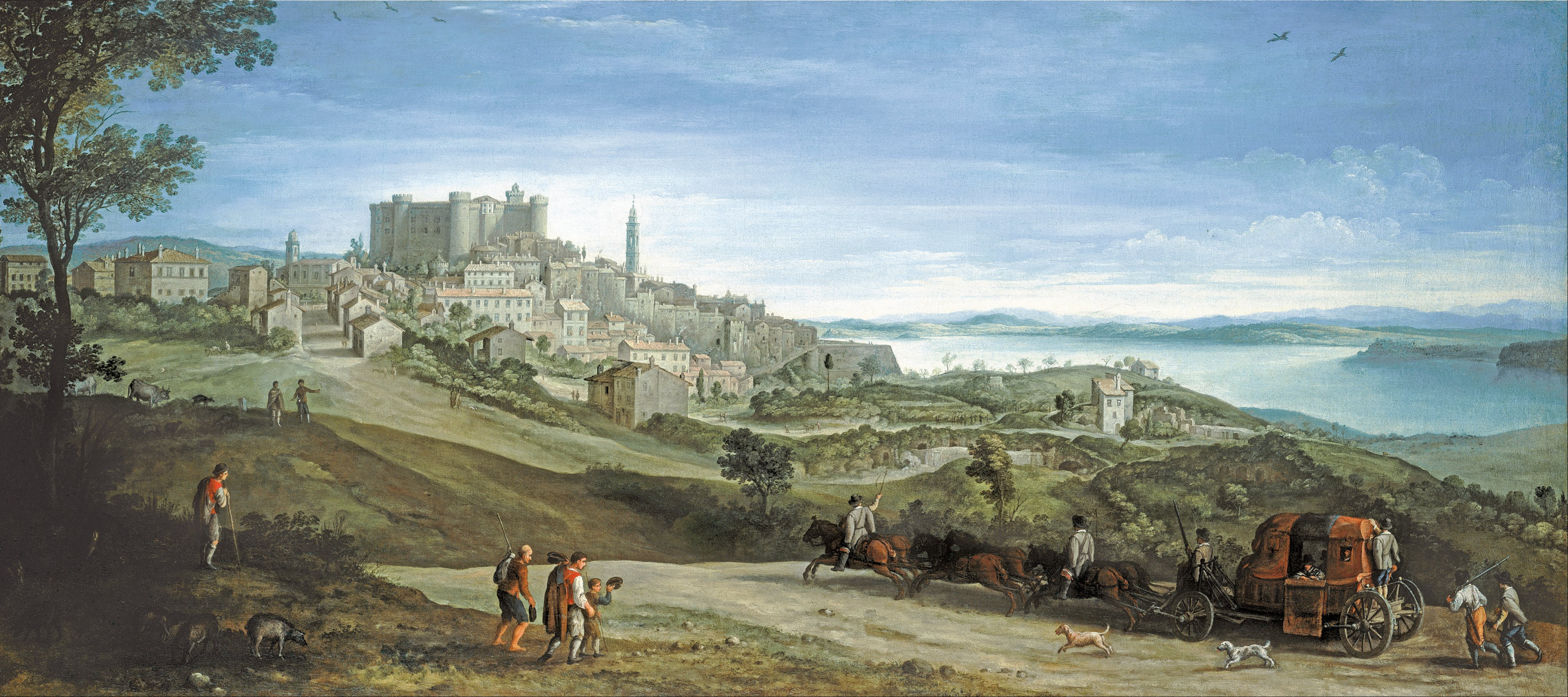
- Artist: Paul Bril
- Year: c. 1620
- Catalogue: 20078P34
- Medium: Oil on canvas
- Dimensions: 74.5 cm × 163.6 cm (29.33 in × 64.40 in)
- Location: Art Gallery of South Australia, Adelaide

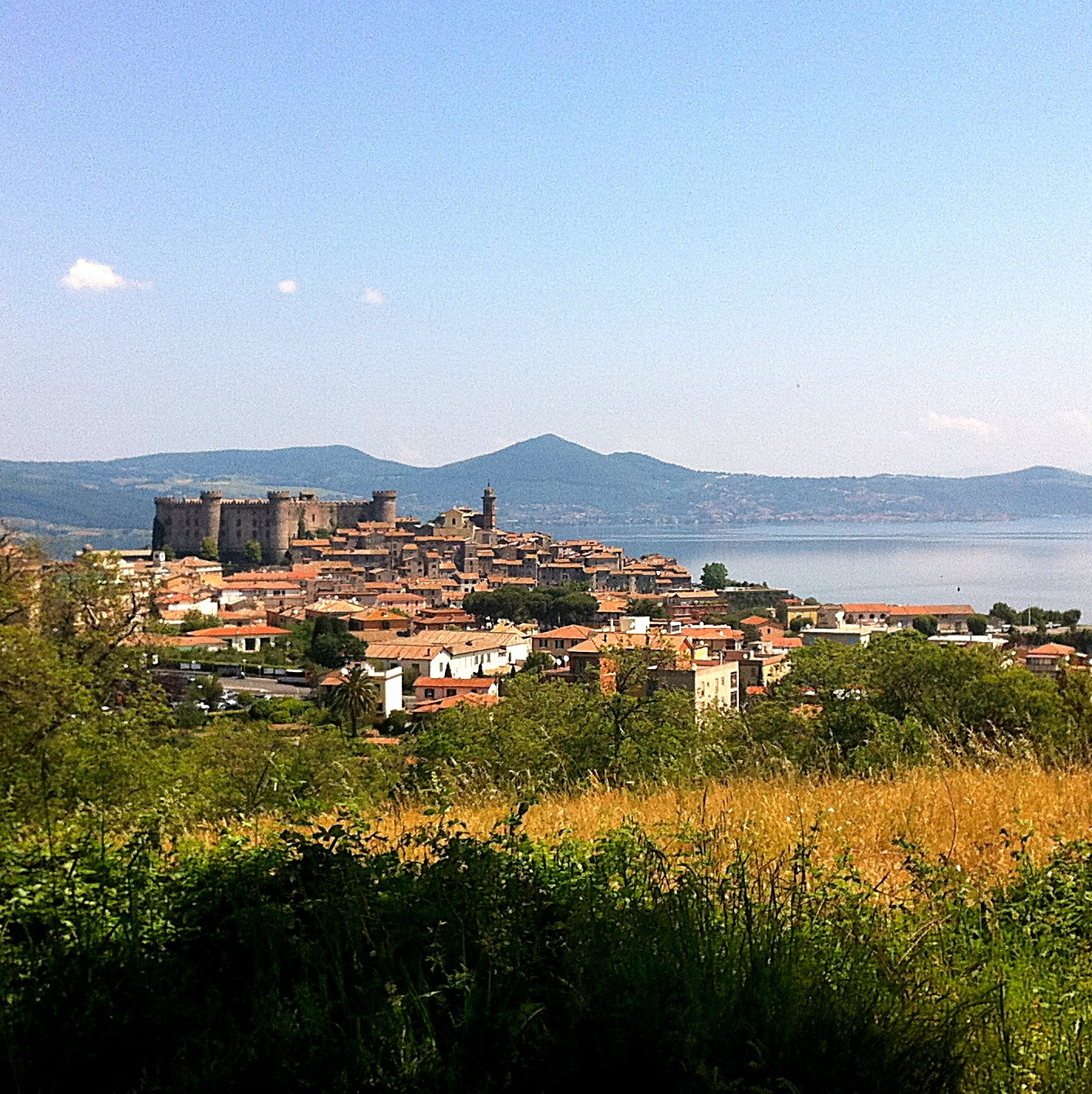
The castle seen from the hospital parking lot

There is no certain information about the origins of Bracciano, on the Via Cassia overlooking the lake.

In 1494 Charles VIII of France and his troops marching against Rome stopped at Bracciano. This act led to the excommunication of the Orsini, and in 1496 the city was besieged by a papal army headed by Giovanni di Candia, son of Pope Alexander VI Borgia, though it resisted successfully. Cesare Borgia, another of Alexander's natural sons, refrained from launching a campaign against the town because its lord, Gian Giordano Orsini, was favored by the French king, Louis XII. The sixteenth century was a period of splendour for Bracciano. The notorious spendthrift and libertine Paolo Giordano I Orsini, having married in 1558 Isabella de' Medici, daughter of Cosimo I, Grand Duke of Tuscany, received the title of duke of Bracciano in 1560. The castle received some modernization for the brief visit of the Medici that year. He hired the most prestigious painter available in Rome, Taddeo Zuccaro, to fresco with allegories and coats-of-arms the fortress's most prestigious room, the Sala Papalinia that had been occupied by Sixtus IV. Isabella spent the remainder of her life avoiding a return to the castle, which a modern tourist tradition would have her haunting.

In the castle, richly frescoed friezes and ceilings now contrast with blank walls, which were hung with richly coloured tapestries when the lords of Bracciano were in residence. The important late-15th century frieze showing the labours of Hercules is still visible.

In the 1620s, the Dutch painter Paul Bril depicted the city in View of Bracciano, one of the earliest known examples of the cityscape style known as veduta.

== Climate ==
The Köppen Climate Classification subtype for this climate is "Csa" (Mediterranean climate).

Climate data for Bracciano (Vigna di Valle) (1991–2020)
Month	Jan	Feb	Mar	Apr	May	Jun	Jul	Aug	Sep	Oct	Nov	Dec	Year
Record high °C (°F)	18.7 (65.7)	19.3 (66.7)	23.8 (74.8)	27.2 (81.0)	31.4 (88.5)	36.0 (96.8)	37.6 (99.7)	39.8 (103.6)	33.4 (92.1)	28.4 (83.1)	24.4 (75.9)	18.8 (65.8)	39.8 (103.6)
Mean daily maximum °C (°F)	10.6 (51.1)	11.6 (52.9)	14.4 (57.9)	17.4 (63.3)	21.9 (71.4)	26.5 (79.7)	29.7 (85.5)	30.0 (86.0)	25.0 (77.0)	20.3 (68.5)	15.2 (59.4)	11.3 (52.3)	19.5 (67.1)
Daily mean °C (°F)	7.5 (45.5)	7.9 (46.2)	10.2 (50.4)	12.9 (55.2)	17.2 (63.0)	21.5 (70.7)	24.3 (75.7)	24.7 (76.5)	20.4 (68.7)	16.4 (61.5)	12.0 (53.6)	8.5 (47.3)	15.3 (59.5)
Mean daily minimum °C (°F)	4.8 (40.6)	4.7 (40.5)	6.6 (43.9)	8.8 (47.8)	12.8 (55.0)	16.8 (62.2)	19.4 (66.9)	20.0 (68.0)	16.5 (61.7)	13.2 (55.8)	9.3 (48.7)	5.9 (42.6)	11.6 (52.9)
Record low °C (°F)	−4.0 (24.8)	−5.0 (23.0)	−3.6 (25.5)	−0.6 (30.9)	5.1 (41.2)	9.8 (49.6)	11.0 (51.8)	12.4 (54.3)	8.7 (47.7)	4.6 (40.3)	0.0 (32.0)	−4.2 (24.4)	−5.0 (23.0)
Average precipitation mm (inches)	70.4 (2.77)	68.2 (2.69)	67.6 (2.66)	63.6 (2.50)	54.1 (2.13)	31.2 (1.23)	24.0 (0.94)	29.1 (1.15)	76.0 (2.99)	126.4 (4.98)	143.2 (5.64)	98.7 (3.89)	852.4 (33.56)
Average precipitation days (≥ 1.0 mm)	7.3	6.8	6.8	7.0	6.3	3.5	2.1	2.6	5.8	7.8	10.3	8.7	74.9
Average relative humidity (%)	77.5	73.6	72.7	72.8	72.0	68.6	65.2	65.9	70.9	76.9	80.3	78.3	72.9
Average dew point °C (°F)	3.8 (38.8)	3.4 (38.1)	5.4 (41.7)	8.2 (46.8)	12.1 (53.8)	15.0 (59.0)	16.4 (61.5)	17.0 (62.6)	15.0 (59.0)	12.5 (54.5)	8.9 (48.0)	4.9 (40.8)	10.2 (50.4)
Mean monthly sunshine hours	155.6	171.6	201.8	225.6	279.3	298.5	335.7	316.2	242.7	183.2	146.4	146.9	2,703.7
Source: NOAA

== Twin towns ==
Bracciano is twinned with

- Neusäß, Germany
- Châtenay-Malabry, France
- Wolaita Sodo, Ethiopia

== Filmography ==
- Medici: Masters of Florence TV series (Castle Bracciano).
- Elisa di Rivombrosa

== See also ==
- Orsini family
- Lake Bracciano

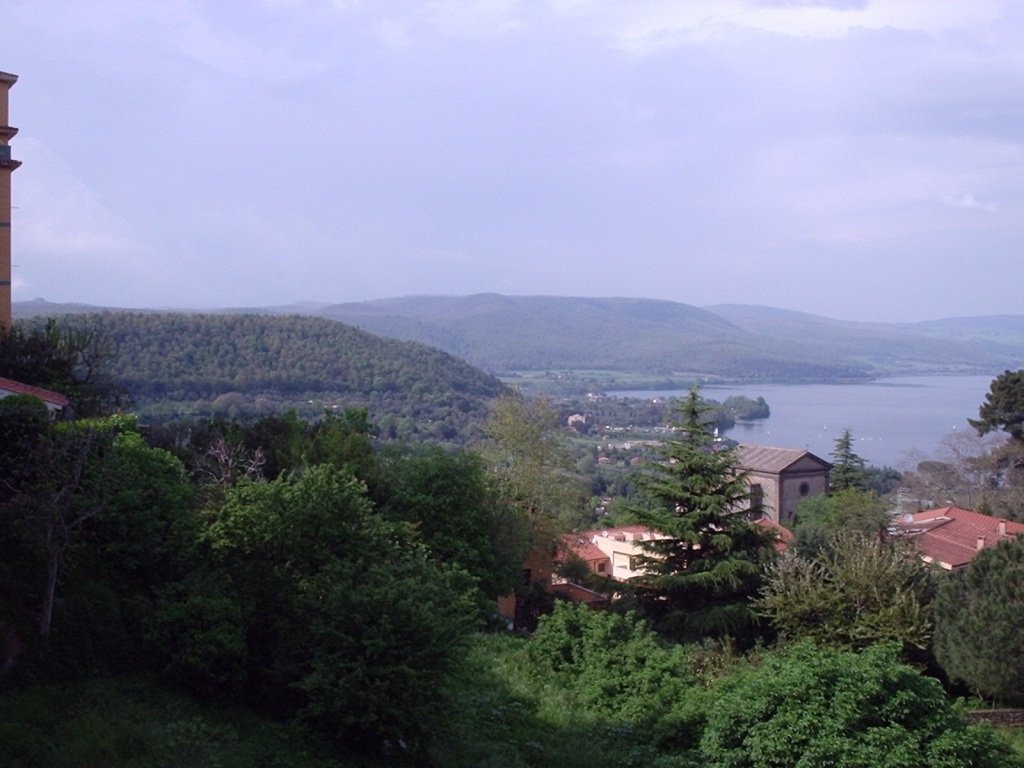
The lake as seen from Largo Falcone and Borsellino, near the castle
