= Federico del Campo =

Peruvian painter

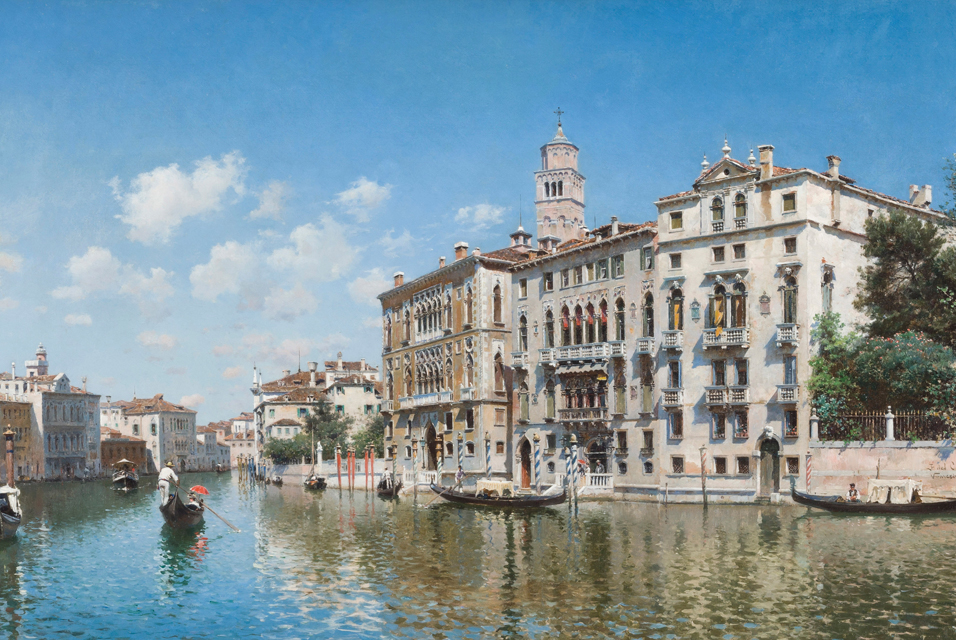
Palazzo Cavalli-Franchetti, Venice

Federico del Campo (1837–1923) was a Peruvian painter who was active in Venice where he was one of the leading vedute painters of the 19th century. Demand for his views, particularly from English tourists was so strong that he painted several views multiple times.

== Life ==
Del Campo was born in Lima and left his native Peru at a young age. Nothing is known with certainty about his early studies in Peru. He studied at Madrid's Real Academia de Bellas Artes de San Fernando (Royal Academy of Fine Arts of San Fernando) in Madrid from around 1865. Here he established a friendship with Lorenzo Valles, a history painter.

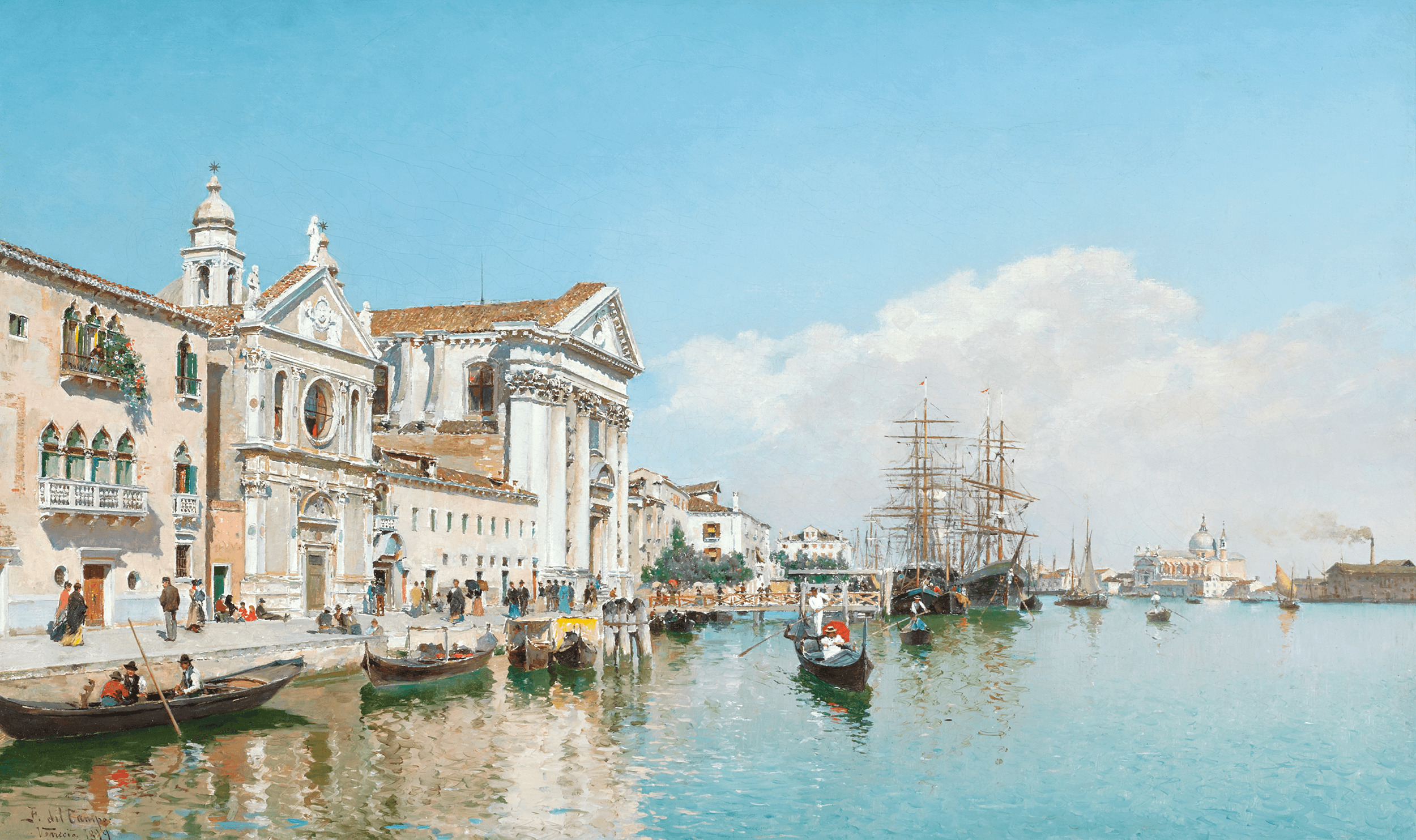
Gesuati church in Venice, 1899

Del Campo subsequently travelled to Italy and painted in Naples, Capri, Rome, Assisi and Venice. During a visit to France he studied new artistic developments in Paris. From 1880, he exhibited works at the annual Salon van de Société des Artistes Français. In 1880 he established himself in Venice.

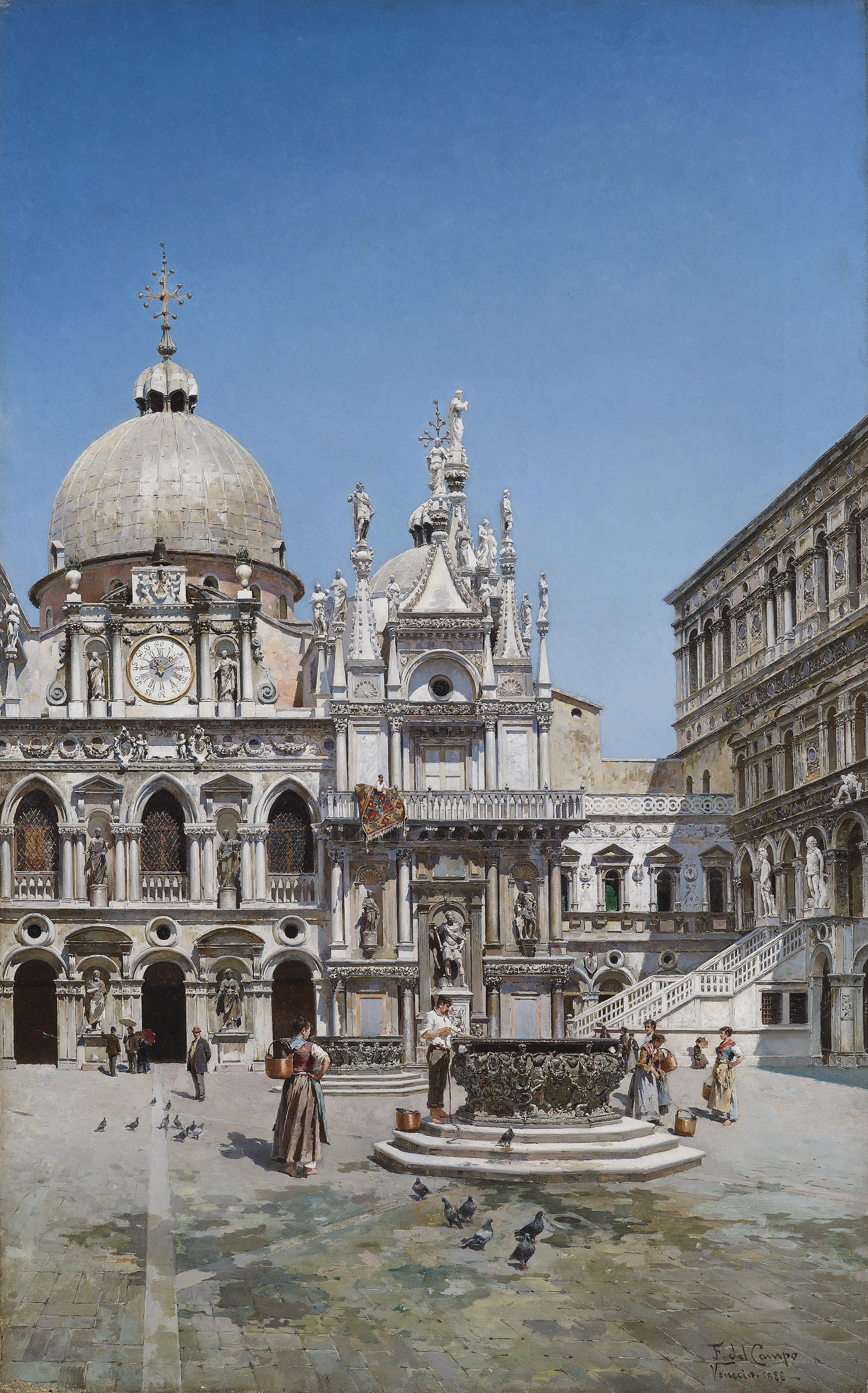
Doge's Palace in Venice

Here there already was a seizable community of émigré artists, such as Antonietta Brandeis, and the Spanish painters Martín Rico y Ortega, Mariano Fortuny and Rafael Senet. He became good friends with Martín Rico. The two artists worked sometimes together painting the Venetian scenes that were popular with the increasing number of visitors to that city. They responded thus to the large international market for their city views of Venice. Demand for del Campo's views was so strong, that he painted several views multiple times.

Particularly English tourists were taken by del Campo’s vedute of Venice. This was probably the reason why he moved to London in 1893 where he worked for a clientele of aristocrats and successful merchants. He was represented by art dealer Arthur Tooth who was able to organize a special exhibition of his work in Chicago during the World's Columbian Exposition of 1893. This success likely ensured del Campo’s comfortable life style. Little is known about his last two decades but it is likely that he died in London in 1923.

== Work ==
Del Campo specialized in landscapes of Venice, the Grand Canal, the Doge's Palace and the St. Mark’s Basilica. His paintings distinguish themselves through their crystalline atmosphere and depict Venice's buildings set against a dazzling, light blue sea and sky. He also used a bright palette and short, fine, brushstrokes and delicate glazes, that give the surface of his paintings a shimmering and luminous quality.
