= Diana and Callisto (Bril) =

Painting by Paul Bril

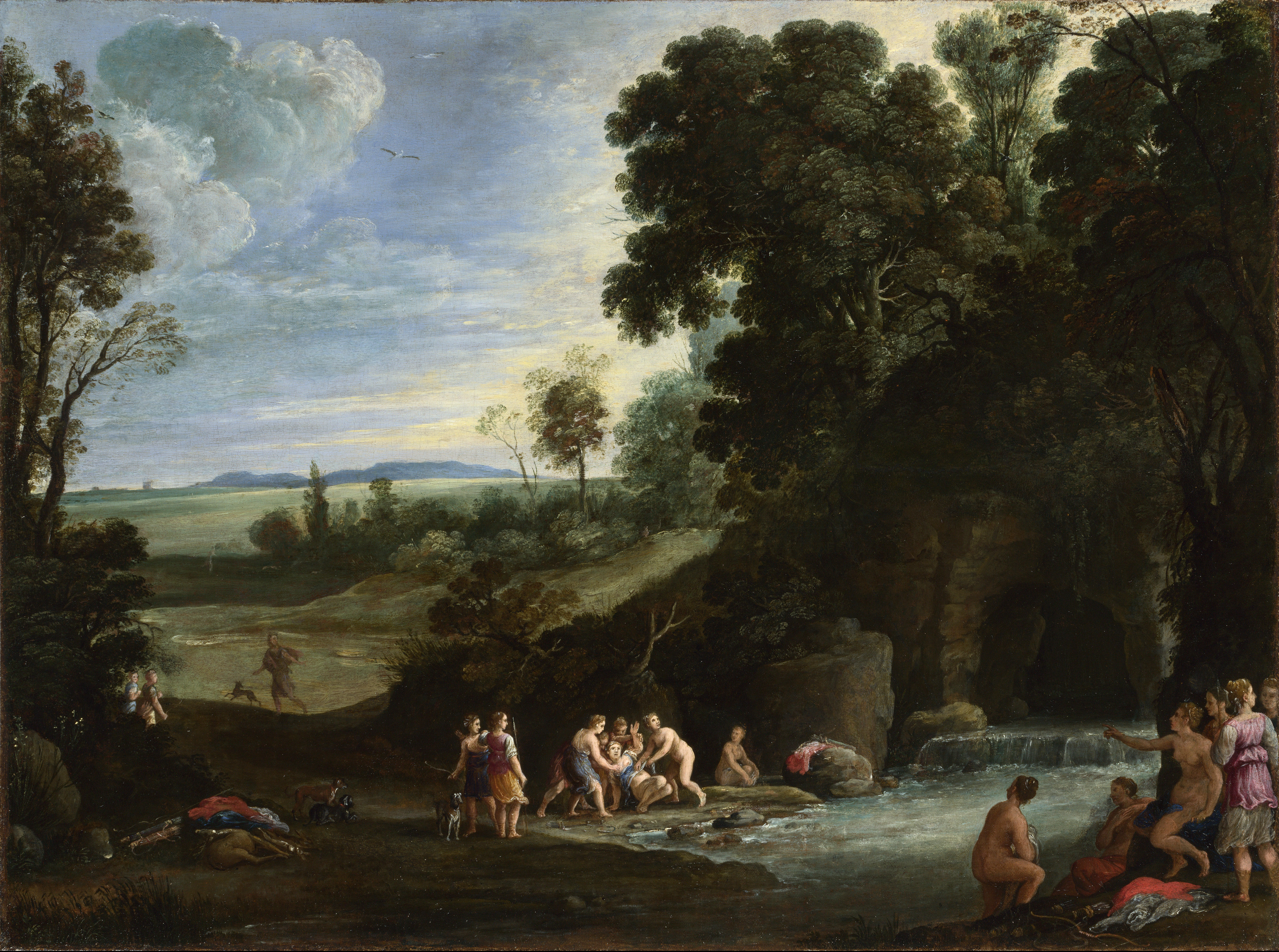
- Artist: Paul Bril
- Year: 1620s
- Catalogue: NG4029
- Medium: Oil on canvas
- Dimensions: 49.5 cm × 72.4 cm (19.4 in × 28.5 in)
- Location: National Gallery, London

Diana and Callisto is an oil-on-canvas painting by Flemish painter Paul Bril. Probably painted in the early 1620s, it was acquired by the National Gallery, London, in 1924.

== Subject ==
In Greek mythology, Callisto was a nymph, or the daughter of King Lycaon, king of Arcadia (which was claimed by Hesiod). For the Romans, she was one of the virginal companions of Diana, who caught the eye of Zeus (Jupiter). As a follower of Artemis, Callisto took a vow to remain a virgin, as did all the nymphs of Artemis.

According to Hesiod, she was seduced by Zeus, and later, when she was already bearing his child, she was "seen by her bathing and so discovered." After this discovery, "[Artemis] was enraged, and changed her into a beast. Thus she became a bear and gave birth to a son called Arkas." According to the mythographer Apollodorus, Zeus disguised himself as Artemis or Apollo, in order to lure Callisto into his embrace. Likewise, according to the Roman Ovid, Jupiter took the form of Diana so that he might evade his wife Juno's detection, forcing himself upon Callisto while she was separated from Diana and the other nymphs. Callisto's subsequent pregnancy was discovered several months later while she was bathing with Diana and her fellow nymphs. Diana became enraged when she saw that Callisto was pregnant and expelled her from the group. Callisto later gave birth to Arcas. Juno then took the opportunity to avenge her wounded pride and transformed the nymph into a bear. Sixteen years later Callisto, still a bear, encountered her son Arcas hunting in the forest. Just as Arcas was about to kill his own mother with his javelin, Jupiter averted the tragedy by placing mother and son amongst the stars as Ursa Major and Minor, respectively. Juno, enraged that her attempt at revenge had been frustrated, appealed to Tethys that the two might never meet her waters, thus providing a poetic explanation for their circumpolar positions in ancient times.

This story was a favorite subject for some 15th-century, 16th-century and 17th-century patrons and artists. This was possibly related to the opportunity this subject gave to paint nude subjects. In Bril's work, the small, Italianate, clumsy staffage figures are but a minor ornamentation to the landscape, the subject for which he became celebrated in Rome.

== Painting ==
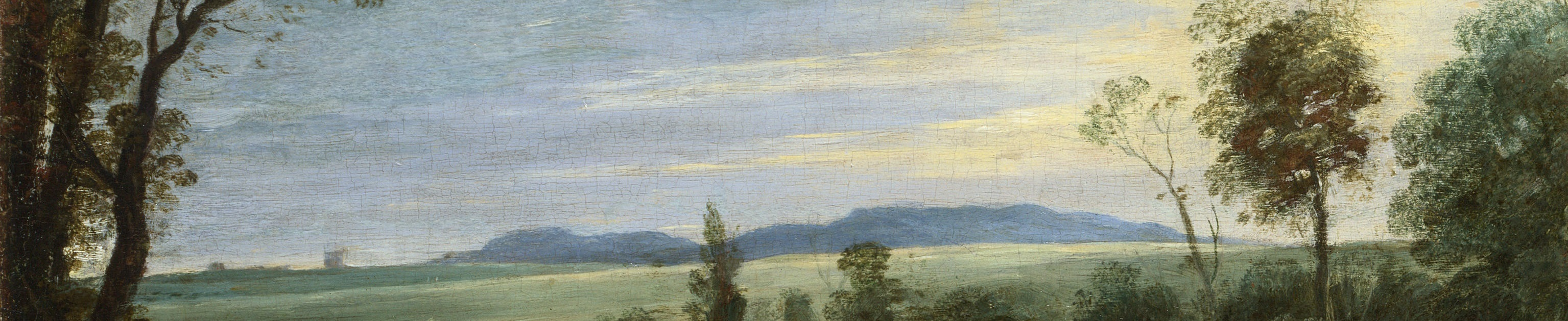
Detail of the landscape

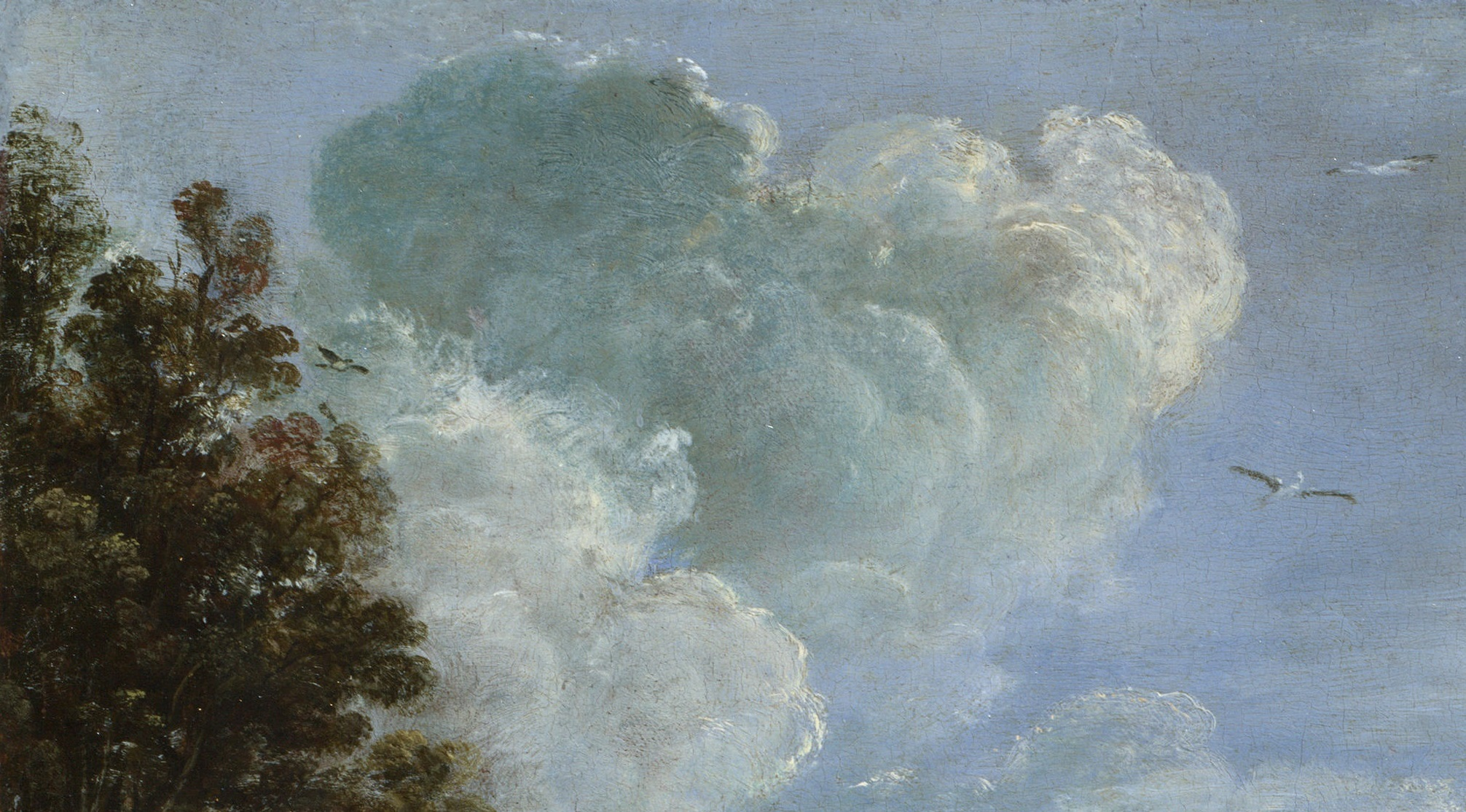
Clouds, detail

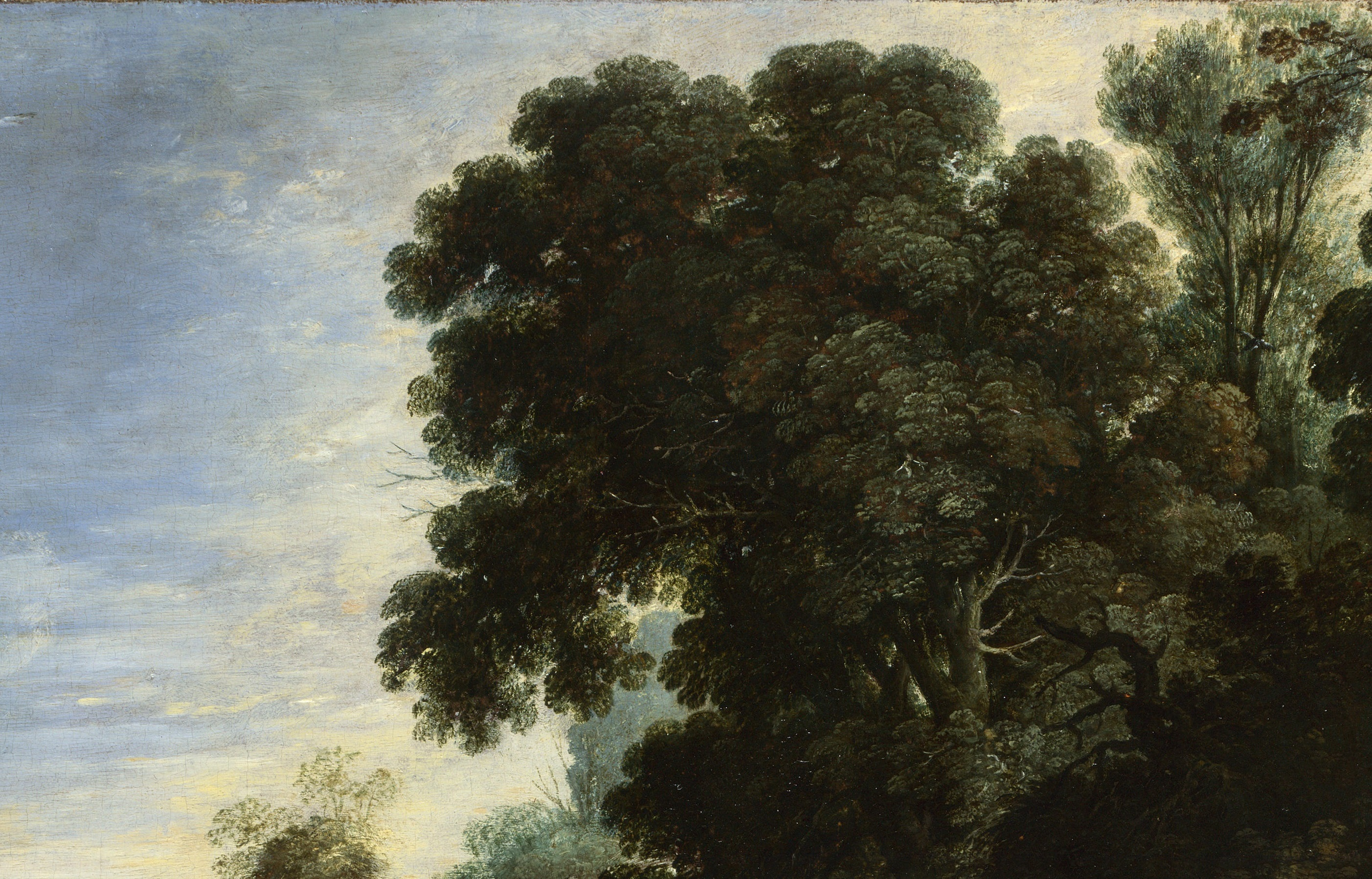
Light from behind the trees

Bril was born and trained in Antwerp. He subsequently moved to Italy in 1575 or 1582. In Rome, he came into contact with the prominent artists of the time and under the influence of the local art movements. This deeply modified his style, which became "calmer and more classicizing". In the 1620s, Bril produced a number of landscapes, such as Diana and Callisto, wherein "broad tranquil settings are inhabited by mythological figures."

In the painting, Diana is seated on a stone in the foreground at lower right, surrounded by the other virgins. On the ground next to her are two quivers, some red and white clothing, and her bow.

Diana is gesturing to a group of nymphs on the other side of the body of water who are forcibly undressing Callisto. On the group's right is a nymph naked and ready to bathe, while on their left two nymphs look on, armed with bow and spears and flanked by a dog.

Dead game, more quivers, a bow and a spear lay next to some blue and red clothing on the bottom left. Next to these are two dogs. A man accompanied by a dog is passing by the undulated opening that leads from the cove to the open fields. The blue peaks of some hills are visible in the background.

Big, white clouds drift left to right. Sunlight radiates from behind the tall trees that border the painting to the right.

The painting was bequeathed to the National Gallery by Sir Claude Phillips upon his death in 1924.
