= Luigi Carboni =

Italian painter

Luigi Carboni (1540–1600) was an Italian painter of the late Renaissance period, depicting mainly landscapes. Carboni was born in Marcianise in Campania, and moved to Rome where he worked under and learned from the Flemish Paul Bril. Grossi describes his landscapes as depicting:

(the) flood of rivers, fall of lightning, the impetuous winds, the storms, and the landscapes granted with noble figures, amaze and delight the viewer...
