= Mountainous Landscape with Saint Jerome =

Painting by Paul Bril

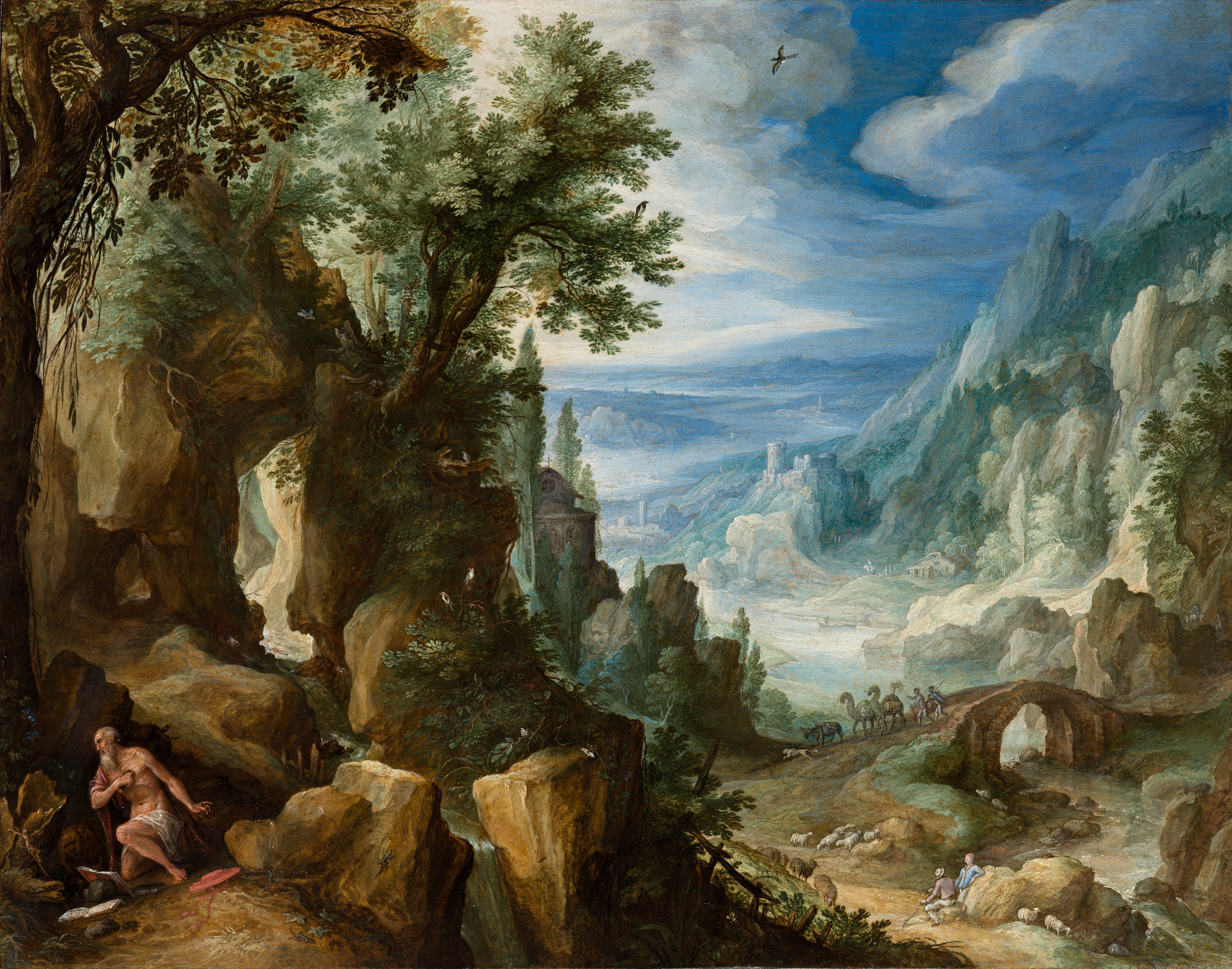
- Artist: Paul Bril
- Year: 1592
- Catalogue: 1204
- Medium: Oil on copper
- Dimensions: 25.7 cm × 32.8 cm (10.1 in × 12.9 in)
- Location: Mauritshuis, The Hague

Mountainous Landscape with Saint Jerome is an oil on copper painting by Flemish painter Paul Bril. It was painted in 1592, and is currently housed at the Mauritshuis in The Hague. The painting was acquired by the Mauritshuis in March 2013. The painting is signed and dated, and represents the earliest dated cabinet painting by Bril. The painting belongs to the period when Bril associated with Jan Brueghel the Elder in Rome, in the last decade of the 16th century. Bril's work from the 1590s has some affinity to the work by Brueghel from the same period, and in fact the painting was originally considered a Brueghel.

== Painting ==
The painting is one of the earliest works painted on copper by Bril, and probably one of the first of Bril's small scale landscape paintings which the artist completed in Rome, where he moved in 1575, 1576, or 1582.

The painting depicts a fantastic landscape, product of the artist's imagination, typical of the Flemish landscapists; a landscape painting tradition whose best known exponents are Joachim Patinir, Herri met de Bles and Pieter Bruegel the Elder. It shows the Holy Land, with craggy rock formations and a river flowing through a valley. A caravan with camels is crossing the river on a bridge. Some shepherds are tending to their flock of sheep. Saint Jerome, represented on the left, albeit standing in the foreground, is not the focal point in the painting. The landscape is the real subject. Briel meticulously detailed the landscape, giving form to butterflies, salamanders and birds. In this painting there are strong local colors with "almost tangible rays of light"; a common feature in Bril.

The painting is not the first work by Bril with Jerome as its subject. Another painting (today at the Prado in Madrid) was reportedly acquired by Peter Paul Rubens in the early 17th century. Rubens reportedly painted over the original work and turned into a "Psyche and Jupiter in the guise of an eagle." The figure of Jerome in the altered work is today visible only through X-rays, and is in the same pose as the Mountainous Landscape with Saint Jerome's. Compared to the Prado canvas, Bril's small oil on copper painting shows more attention to detail.

A preparatory sketch in chalk and pen for this work is kept at the Uffizi in Florence. It show Briel's early plans for the work, with the original idea for the landscape and position of Jerome. The drawing at the Uffizi is a rare exemplary of study by Briel that survived to this day. His drawings were considered not worth collecting. The largest part of them has not been preserved.

== Bibliography ==
- Fiamminghi e Olandesi a Firenze : disegni dalle collezioni degli Uffizi, Kloek/Meijer 2008, pp. 86–87, onder nr. 44
- Mauritshuis in focus, 26 (2013) 1, p. 3
- A. van Suchtelen, 'Paul Bril in het Mauritshuis', Mauritshuis in focus, 26 (2013) 2, p. 22-28
- G.T. Faggin, 'Per Paolo Bril', Paragone, CLXXXV, 1965, pp. 22, 27, 32, no. 46, note 8, pl. 16.
- J. Zimmer, Joseph Heintz der Ältere als Maler, Weißenhorn, 1971, p. 88.
- W. Kloek, Beknopte catalogus van de Nederlandse tekeningen in het prentenkabinet van de Uffizi te Florence, Utrecht, 1975, under no. 32.
- A. Blankert, Nederlandse Italianiserende Landschapschilders, Soest, 1978, p. 225.
- T. Gerszi, 'Les antécédents du tableau de Jan Brueghel "Paysage rocheux avec Saint Antoine" et son influence', Bulletin du Musée Hongrois des Beaux-Arts, LI, 1978, p. 113, note 14.
- L. Salerno, Landscape Painters of the Seventeenth Century in Rome, Rome, 1976, I, p. 12, pl. 2.1, note 13; III, p. 1002, note 13.
- K.G. Boon, Paul Bril's 'perfetta imitazione de' veri paesi, Relations artistiques entre les Pays-Bas et l'Italie à la renaissance: études dédiées à * * Suzanne Sulzberger, Brussels and Rome, 1980, p. 6, note 8.
- S. Bedoni, Jan Brueghel in Italia e il Collezionismo del Seicento, Florence and Milan, 1983, p. 94, 97.
- A. Berger, Die Tafelgemälde Paul Brils, Munster, 1993, p. 203.
- E.P. Bowron, '"Full Details and Very Subtly and Carefully Executed": Oil paintings on copper around 1600', The International Fine Art Fair, Seventh Regiment Armory, New York, 1995, p. 16, fig. 7.
- L. Pijl, 'Bril (Brill; Brilli; Brillo), Paul (Paolo; Paulus)', in G. Meissner, et al., Allgemeines Künstler-Lexikon: Die Bildenden Künstler aller Zeiten und Völker, XIV, Munich and Leipzig, 1996, p. 228.
- E.P. Bowron, 'A brief history of European oil paintings on copper 1560-1775', in Copper as Canvas: Two Centuries of Masterpiece paintings on copper 1575–1775, exhibition catalogue, Phoenix, Art Museum; Kansas, The Nelson-Atkins Museum of Art and The Hague, The Royal Cabinet of Paintings Maurithuis, 1998–1999, pp. 17 and 146.
- L. Wood Ruby, Paul Bril: The Drawings, Turnhout, 1999, pp. 79, 120, 140, note 132; p. 146, note 368; and p. 151, note 589.
- L.Pijl, review Louisa Wood Ruby, 'Paul Bril: The Drawings, The Burlington Magazine, CXLII, 2000, p. 177.
- F. Cappelletti, Paul Bril e la pittura di paesaggio a Roma 1580–1630, Rome, 2005, p. 216, no. 15.
- L. Pijl, in W.Th. Kloek and B.W. Meijer, Fiamminghi e Olandesi a Firenze: Disegni dalle collezioni degli Uffizi, exhibition catalogue, Florence, Gabinetto dei disegni e stampe degli Uffizi, 2008, pp. 86–7, under no. 44
