= Martín Rico =

Spanish painter (1833–1908)

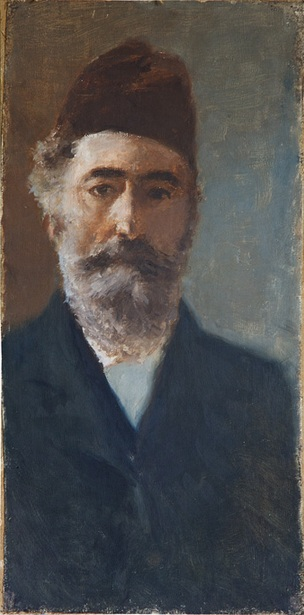
- Self-portrait (1908)
- Born: 12 November 1833; El Escorial
- Died: 13 April 1908 (aged 74); Venice
- Education: Real Academia de Bellas Artes de San Fernando
- Known for: Landscapes and cityscapes
- Style: Barbizon school
- Movement: Romanticism

Martín Rico y Ortega (El Escorial 12 November 1833 – Venice 13 April 1908) was a Spanish painter of landscapes and cityscapes.

Rico was one of the most important artists of the second half of the nineteenth century in his native country, and enjoyed wide international recognition as well, especially in France and the United States. From his earliest works painted in the mountainous countryside outside of Madrid to the later works he painted in Paris and Venice, throughout his life Rico stayed true to his love of painting en plein air, despite his evolving artistic style.

== Biography ==
Rico was born in El Escorial, Madrid, and received his earliest formal training at the city's Real Academia de Bellas Artes de San Fernando, where he studied under Jenaro Pérez Villaamil, the Academy's first professor of landscape painting. Under the tutelage of Pérez Villaamil, Rico's earliest works show him influenced by Romanticism, the style for which his teacher was known. In 1860, having been awarded a government-sponsored scholarship, Rico moved to Paris to continue his studies.

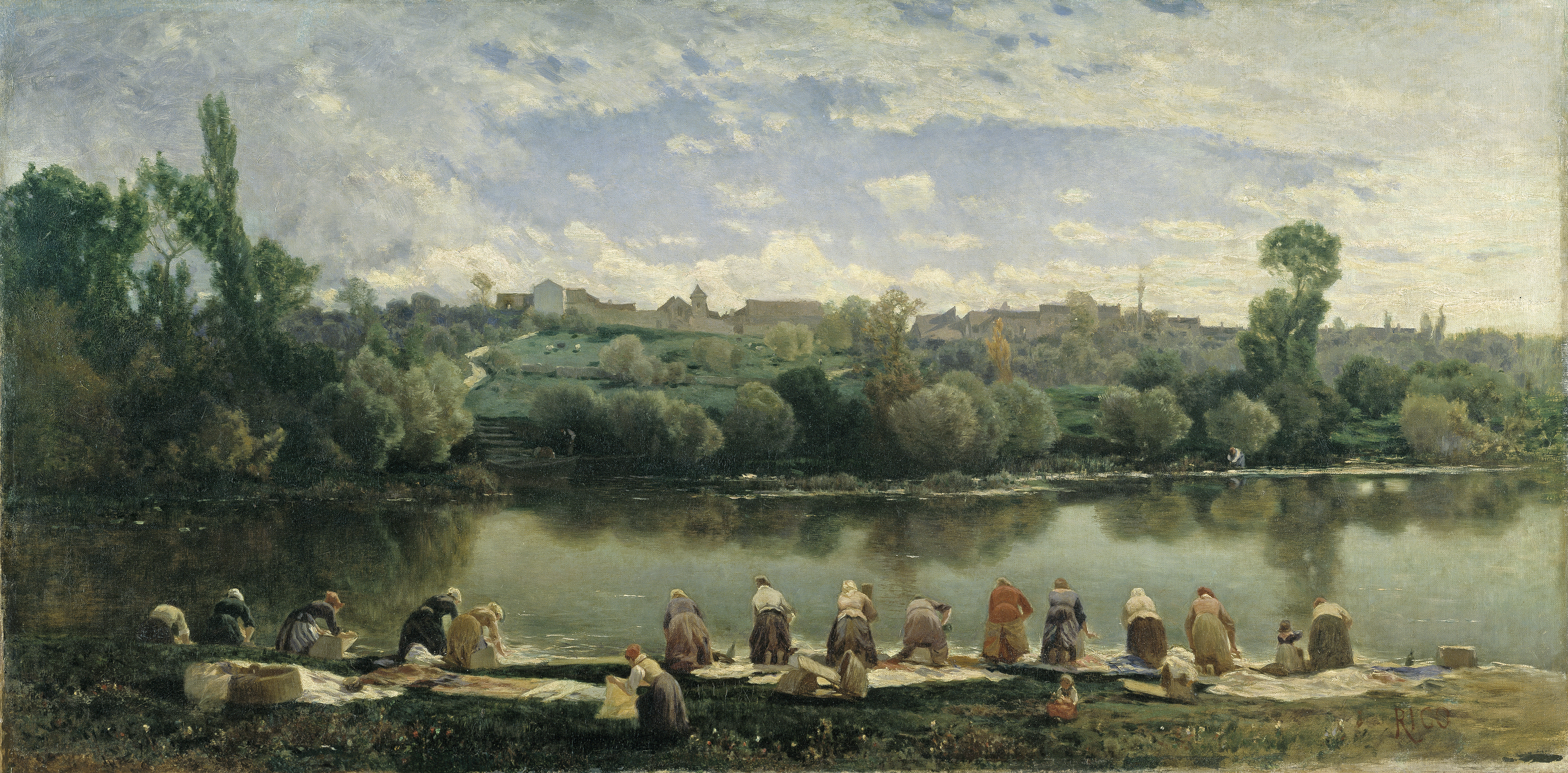
The Washerwomen of La Varenne.

Once in France, Rico looked to the artists of the Barbizon school for inspiration, and Charles-François Daubigny in particular. His landscapes from this decade thus depict the French and Swiss countryside in a fully accomplished Realist style. Toward the end of 1870, due to political and social unrest caused by the outbreak of the Franco-Prussian War, Rico decided to leave France and return to his native Spain.

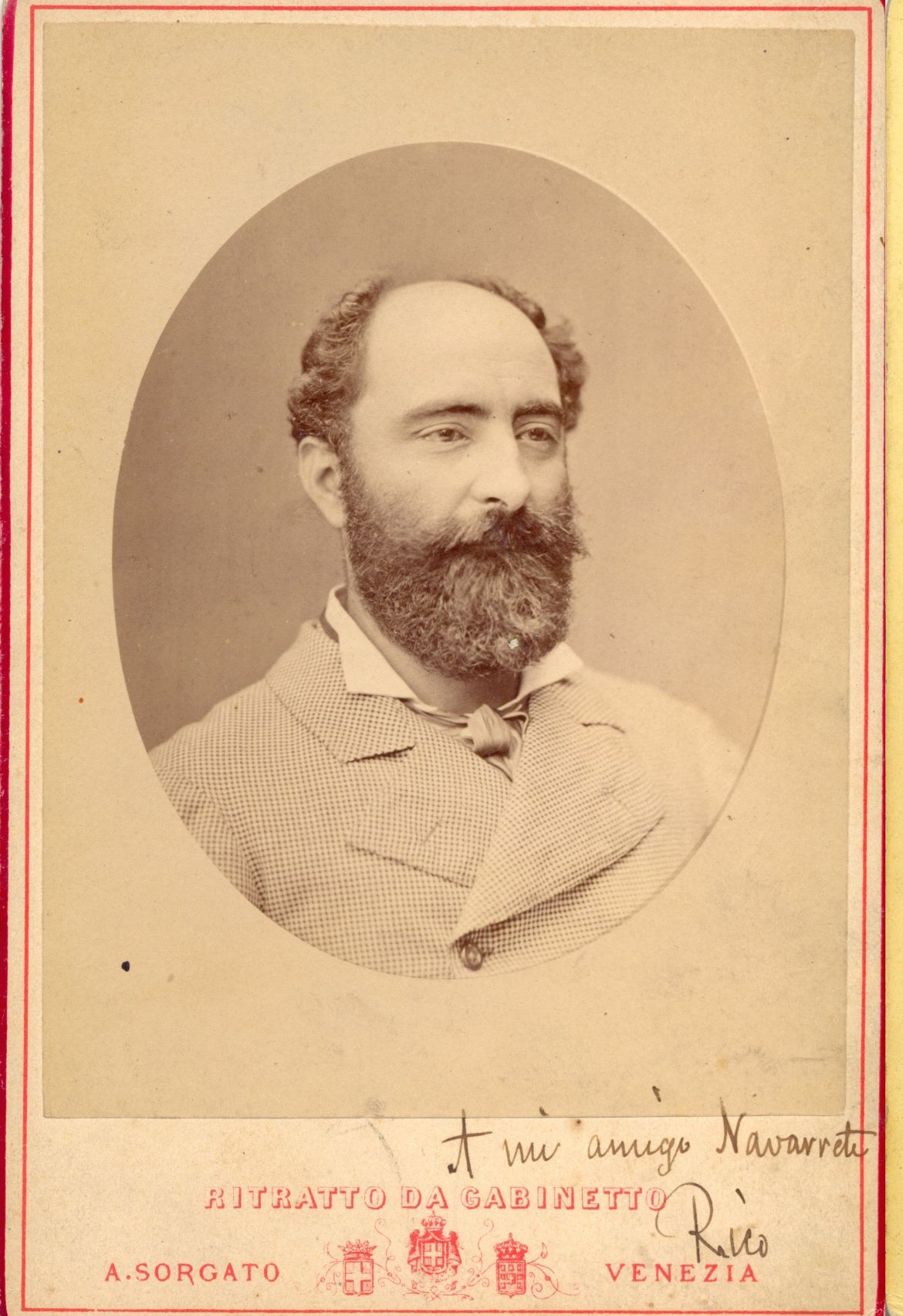
Painter Martín Rico y Ortega, photo dedicated to his friend, 1890

At the invitation of his good friend and colleague Marià Fortuny, Rico moved to the southern city of Granada, joining Fortuny and his wife Cecilia, as well as the painter Ricardo de Madrazo. The three artists worked closely during this period, with the styles of Rico and Fortuny overlapping so much that their watercolors—a specialty for both artists—were often confused for one another. It was during this time that, through Fortuny's influence, Rico's paintings began to reveal a newfound sense of luminosity and color. His time in Andalucía was, according to his memoirs, one of his happiest, and also one of his most artistically productive periods.

=== Discovering Venice ===
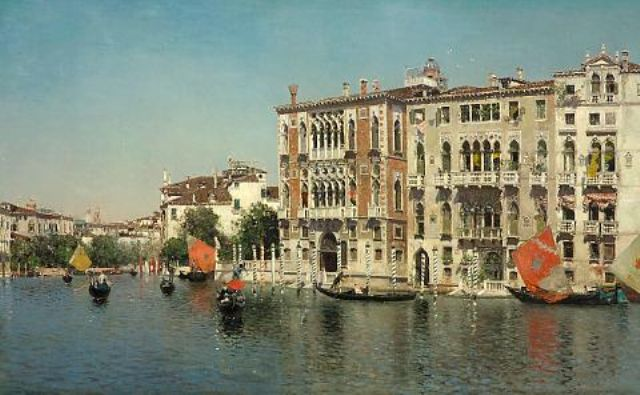
A view of the Palazzo Cavalli-Franchetti and Palazzo Barbaro on the Grand Canal

It was Rico's discovery of Venice in 1873, however, that led to the perfection of his artistic style and the creation of many of his most emblematic works. This year, Rico and Fortuny traveled together to Italy, stopping in Rome, Naples, Florence and Venice: it was Venice, more than any other city he had previously visited, that captured Rico's artistic imagination. From this first trip until his death thirty-six years later, Rico spent every summer with the exception of one working in the Italian “City of Light.” Venice's unique setting, with its plazas, churches and canals, as well as its magnificent light, attracted many artists, including Édouard Manet, Claude Monet, John Singer Sargent, Pierre Renoir and Federico del Campo. Joining this group of artists while following in the tradition of the Italian vedute of the eighteenth century, Rico frequently painted his Venetian scenes outdoors, often from a gondola anchored to a canal or from the window of his room located in the Dorsoduro neighborhood. Rico became in particular good friends with the Peruvian painter Federico del Campo. The two artists worked sometimes together painting the Venetian scenes that were popular with the increasing number of travelers to that city.

Rico died in Venice, aged 74 and is interred at the San Michele cemetery on the Isola di San Michele.
