= View of Bracciano =

Painting by Paul Bril

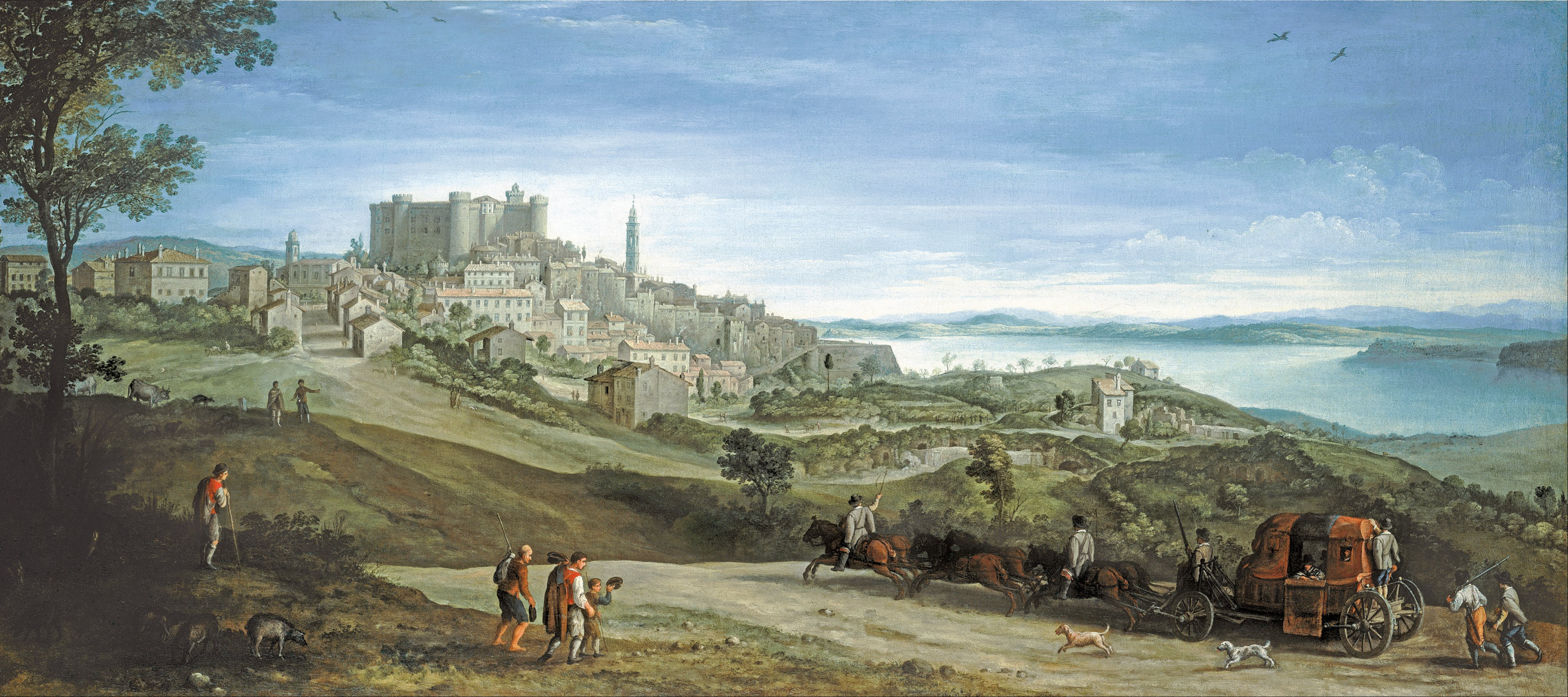
- Artist: Paul Bril
- Year: c. 1620
- Catalogue: 20078P34
- Medium: Oil on canvas
- Dimensions: 74.5 cm × 163.6 cm (29.33 in × 64.40 in)
- Location: Art Gallery of South Australia; Adelaide

View of Bracciano is an oil-on-canvas painting by Flemish painter Paul Bril. It was painted in the early 1620s, and is currently housed at the Art Gallery of South Australia in Adelaide. The painting was acquired by the Art Gallery of South Australia in 2007.

== Painting ==
The painting is a view of Bracciano, a small town today part of the Italian region of Lazio (in Bril's day within the Papal States), 30 kilometres (19 miles) northwest of Rome.

Bril completed this work during his stay in Italy, where he probably arrived in 1582, and went on to become "perhaps the most popular painter of landscapes in Rome in the late 16th and early 17th centuries."

In the foreground, an armed carriage drawn by six horses and followed by two dogs is travelling to a castle commanding a small town. Three commoners took off their hats as the carriage passes by, while a herdsman leans on his staff. From the carriage on the bottom right corner, the undulate road leads crosswise to the town, which descends to the lake (Lake of Bracciano) from left to right. Topographical representations like the View of Bracciano are rare in Bril. He completed this painting in the 1620s.

The Roy and Marjory Edwards Bequest Fund and the Art Gallery of South Australia Foundation acquired the painting in 2007.
