= Antonietta Brandeis =

Italian painter

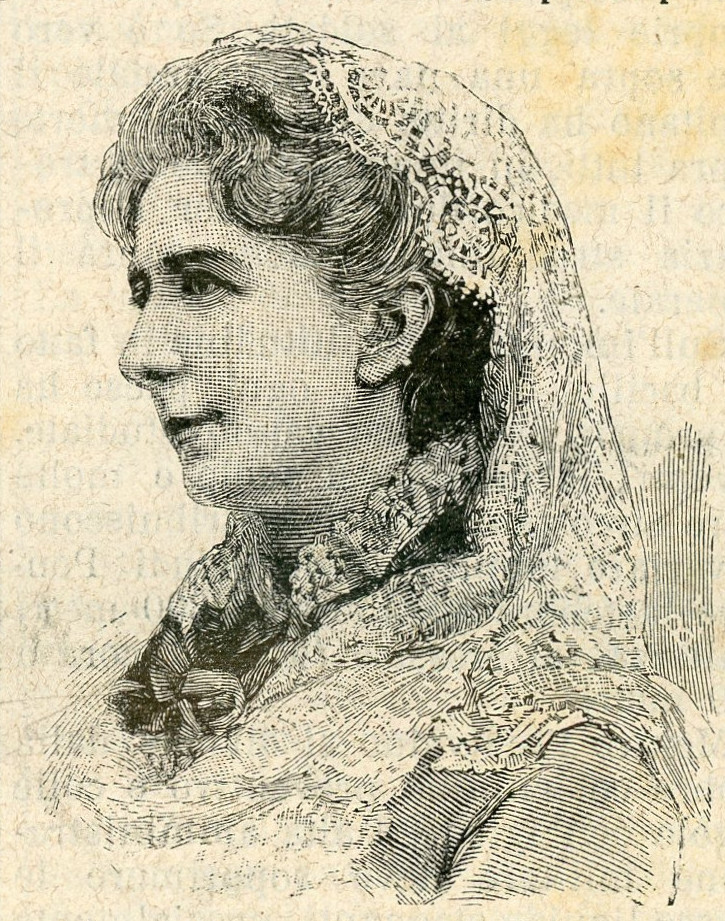
- Born: 13 January 1848; Miskovice, Bohemia, Austrian Empire
- Died: 20 March 1926 (aged 78); Florence, Italy
- Education: Venetian Academy of Fine Arts
- Known for: Painting
- Style: Landscape; Genre; Portrait; Religious art
- Spouse: Antonio Zamboni (1897–1909)

Antonietta Brandeis, also known as Antonie Brandeisová (1848–1926), was a Czech-born Italian landscape, genre and portrait painter, as well as a painter of religious subjects for altarpieces.

== Early life ==
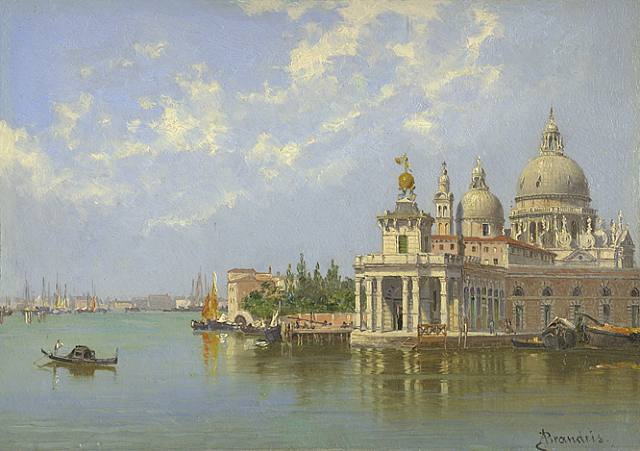
Dogana and Santa Maria della Salute, Venice

She was born on 13 January 1848 in Miskovice (near Kutná Hora) in Bohemia, Austria-Hungary. The first bibliographical indication of Antonietta Brandeis dates from her teens, when she is mentioned as a pupil of the Czech artist Karel Javůrek of Prague. After the death of Brandeis' father, her mother, Giuseppina Dravhozvall, married the Venetian Giovanni Nobile Scaramella; shortly afterward the family apparently moved to Venice.

In the 1867 registry of the Venetian Academy of Fine Arts, Brandeis is listed as being enrolled as an art student. At this time, she would have been nineteen, and one of the first females to receive academic instruction in the fine arts in Italy. In fact, the Ministry granted women the legal right to instruction in the fine arts only in 1875, by which time Brandeis had finished her education at the academy.

== Teachers ==
Brandeis’s professors at the Venetian Academy of Fine Arts include Michelangelo Grigoletti and Napoleone Nani for life drawing, Domenico Bresolin for landscape, Pompeo Marino Molmenti for painting and Federico Moja for perspective. Already during her first years of study there is evidence of Brandeis' skill—in her first year she is awarded prizes and honors in Perspective and Life Drawing. Brandeis’ continuing excellence and diligence in her artistic studies during the five years she spends at the academy is attested to in the lists of prize-winning students of the academy “Elenco alunni premiati Accademia Venezia in Atti della Reale Accademia di Belle Arti in Venezia degli anni 1866–1872”. It includes numerous mentions of prizes and high honours won by Brandeis in Art History, Perspective, Life Drawing, Landscape and Anatomical Drawing, Drawing of Sculpture, and “Class of Folds”.

== Venice ==
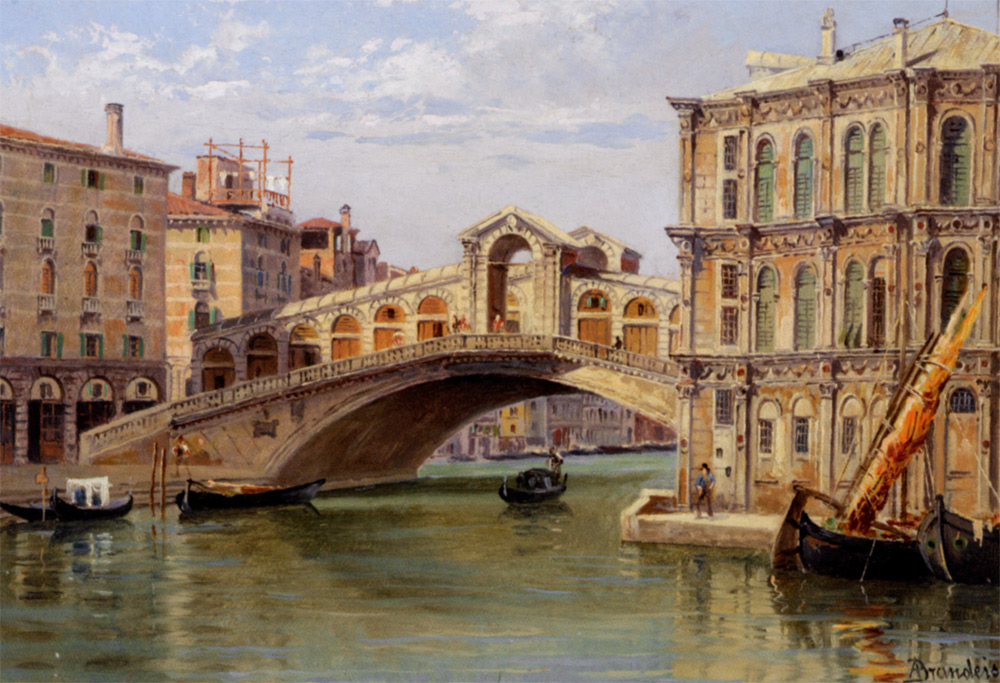
The Ponte di Rialto, Venice

It is in Venice at the academy that Brandeis perfected her skills as a meticulous landscape and cityscape painter, with intricate and luminous details in the tradition of the eighteenth-century "vedutisti". In 1870, while still a student at the academy, she participated in her first exhibition; that of the Società Veneta Promotrice di Belle Arti with the oil painting Cascina della Madonna di Monte Varese. She is documented as having exhibited eight paintings during the years 1872 to 1876 with the Società Veneta Promotrice di Belle Arti, both landscapes and genre scenes. In the exhibit of 1875 her landscape Palazzo, Marin Falier is sold to M. Hall of London for 320 lire, a first indication of the success Brandeis will achieve with foreign collectors of her work (particularly the English and German visitors to Italy on the Grand Tour circuit). During these same years, she showed two paintings in the Florentine exhibit Promotrice Fiorentina. The first painting, entitled Gondola, is a subject which she repeats in new variations throughout her career with great success. The second, perhaps a genre painting, is entitled “Buon dì !” The two paintings remained unsold and were presented at the same exhibition the following year, together with two more genre scene paintings.

In 1876 and 1877 she exhibited three landscapes of Venice at the Promotrice Veneta, which sold to foreign collectors. In November 1877 Brandeis showed the large painting Palazzo Cavalli a Venezia at the exhibition of the Hungarian Fine Arts Society in Budapest. In both Florence and Budapest, Brandeis showed her work under the name Antonio Brandeis. The biographer De Gubernatis offers the following explanation for the change of name: "her first pictures received praise and criticism; she took the criticism, but when she was praised as a woman she was annoyed, and therefore exhibited under the name Antonio Brandeis."

During the years 1878 to 1893 Brandeis painted and exhibited numerous works, primarily scenes of Venice, and although she resided chiefly in that city she also traveled and painted in Verona, Bologna, Florence, and Rome. As well as in Venice and Florence, she exhibited in Turin, Milan, and Rome. In 1880 she was present at the International Exposition of Melbourne with three paintings: Palazzo Cavalli, A Balcony in Venice and The Buranella – native of Burano Island near Venice.

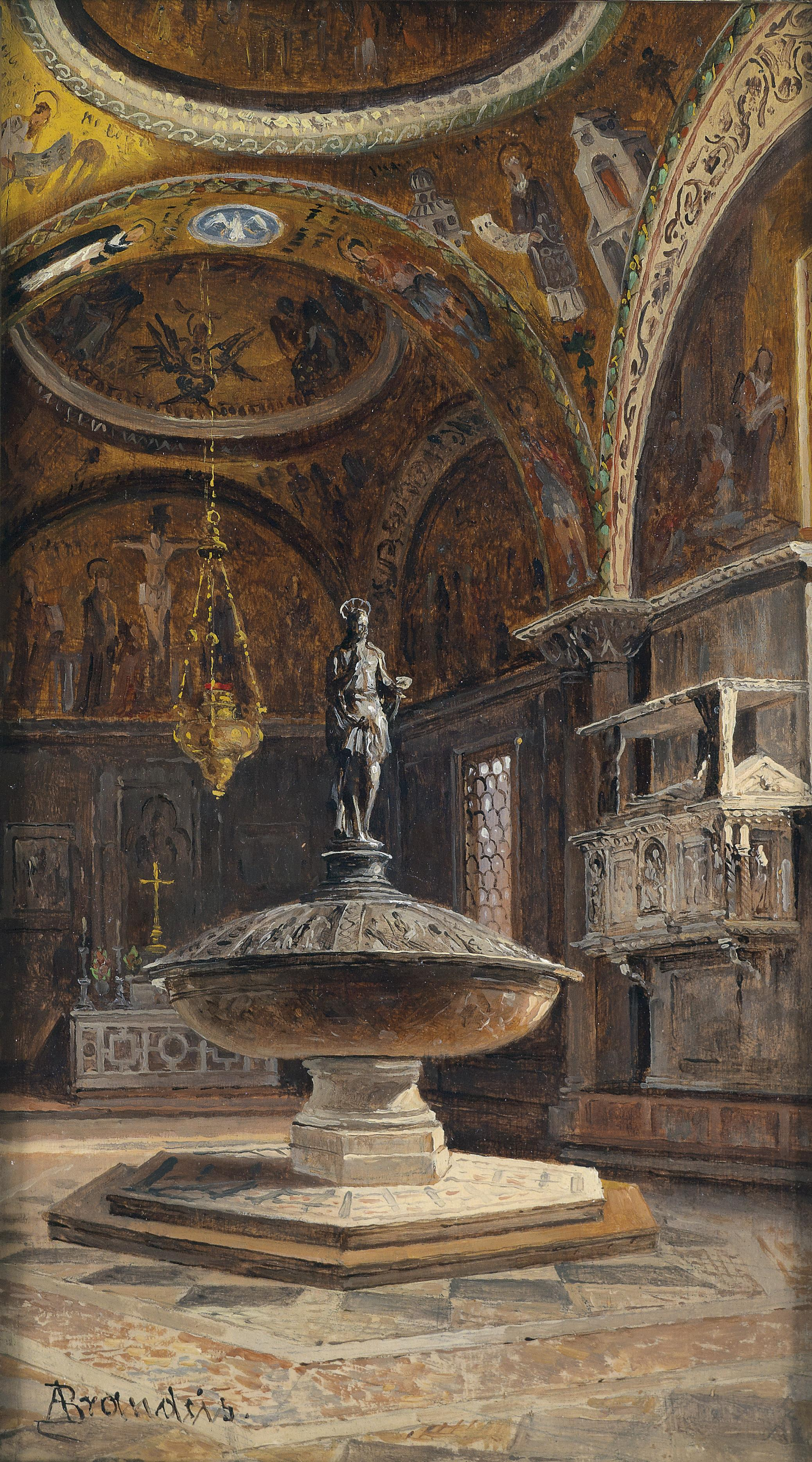
Baptismal Font at Saint Mark's Basilica

Brandeis was a prolific painter, and often replicated her most popular subjects with only slight variations. She was represented in Venice at the photographer Naya’s studios in Piazza San Marco and in Campo San Maurizio and in Florence she collaborated with the picture dealer Giovanni Masini.

During this period of intense activity painting landscapes en plein air and genre scenes, Brandeis also is documented in De Gubernatis as a painter of religious altarpieces. Several of these altarpieces can be found on the Island of Korcula in Croatia. Two are visible in the parish church of Smokvici and of in the church of St. Vitus in Blato. In the sacristy of the Cathedral of Korcula is a Madonna with Christ Child painted by Brandeis. For the same church she also painted a copy of the central panel of Giovanni Bellini’s triptych from the Venetian Church of Santa Maria dei Frari Gloriosa (1488). In 1899, for the main altar of the chapel of St. Luke in the Korcula town cemetery, Brandeis painted a St. Luke, which shows the sparkling colors and free impasto typical of her plein air oil paintings.

On 27 October 1897, at the age of 49, Brandeis married the Venetian Antonio Zamboni, a knight and officer of the Italian Crown and knight of the Order of SS. Maurizio and Lazzaro. The couple continued to reside in Venice and Brandeis continued to show at Italian exhibitions in Venice, Florence, and Rome although more sporadically and with fewer works than before. Although she participated in the International Exposition of Watercolourists in Rome in 1906 with a “Study” and in the Società Promotrice delle Belle Arti in Florence in 1907 and 1908 with two oil paintings, De Gubernatis quotes Brandeis as saying in 1906, that even though she resides in Venice “I am a foreigner, and for some time I have not taken part in Italian Exhibitions, sending all my paintings to London. Antonio Zamboni died 11 March 1909 and from then on, Brandeis resided primarily in her Florentine home on Via Mannelli, continuing to paint in her studio there until her death on 20 March 1926.

== Legacy ==
According to her last will and testament, dated 1 January 1922, and preserved in the archives of the Innocenti Foundling Hospital in Florence, Brandeis left the bulk of her worldly goods to the orphanage, including her sketchbooks and her works of art still in her possession, except for four paintings, for which she left money to be well framed and given to the Modern Art Gallery of the Pitti Palace. Laura Capella, daughter of her dear friend and fellow artist Giulia Capella, painted the portrait of Brandeis in 1924 which hangs in the Benefactors Room of the Innocenti Institute. Most of Brandeis' belongings, including her artworks, were sold at public auction in December 1926, but the Innocenti Institute still conserves at least twelve of her oil paintings, as well as numerous watercolors and sketchbooks, which provide much information about the artist's painting technique.

As well as at the Innocenti Institute and the Gallery of Modern Art at the Pitti Palace in Florence, Antonietta Brandeis’ works are in private collections in many parts of the world. Her works can also be found at the University of Virginia Art Museum, the Gloucester City Museum and Art Gallery, the Revoltella Museum in Trieste, and on the island of Korcula, Croatia (in the chapel of St. Luke in the Korcula town cemetery, the Cathedral of Korcula, St. Vitus Church in Blato and the parish church of Smokvica).

== Exhibitions ==
- July 2012 to 28 October 2012, Florence Through the Artists’ Eyes, From Signorini to Rosai, exhibit at the Pitti Palace Exhibit, Gallery of Modern Art, 7th “The Niobe Room at the Uffizi” by Antonietta Brandeis. One of four paintings donated to the Pitti Palace by the artist at her death in 1926, this small oil on cardboard (29 x 35 cm.) depicts a female artist engaged in painting from life in the Room of the Niobe, one of the most famous rooms of the Uffizi Gallery. The painting is an extremely faithful depiction of the arrangement of the room at the time, as evidenced by a period photograph in the archives of the City of Florence. Indeed, the artist probably spent time in the Uffizi executing copies herself.
- 13–21 February 2010 Antonietta Brandeis (1848–1926) Vedute dell’Ottocento al femminile. Dipinti di una collezione privata, Modenantiquaria Exhibit of ninety-eight works of Antonietta Brandeis, the first extensive show of this artists’ works. Show curated by Paolo Serafini, also author of the catalogue. Executive curator Gianluca Colombo.
