= Paul Bril =

Flemish painter (1554–1626)

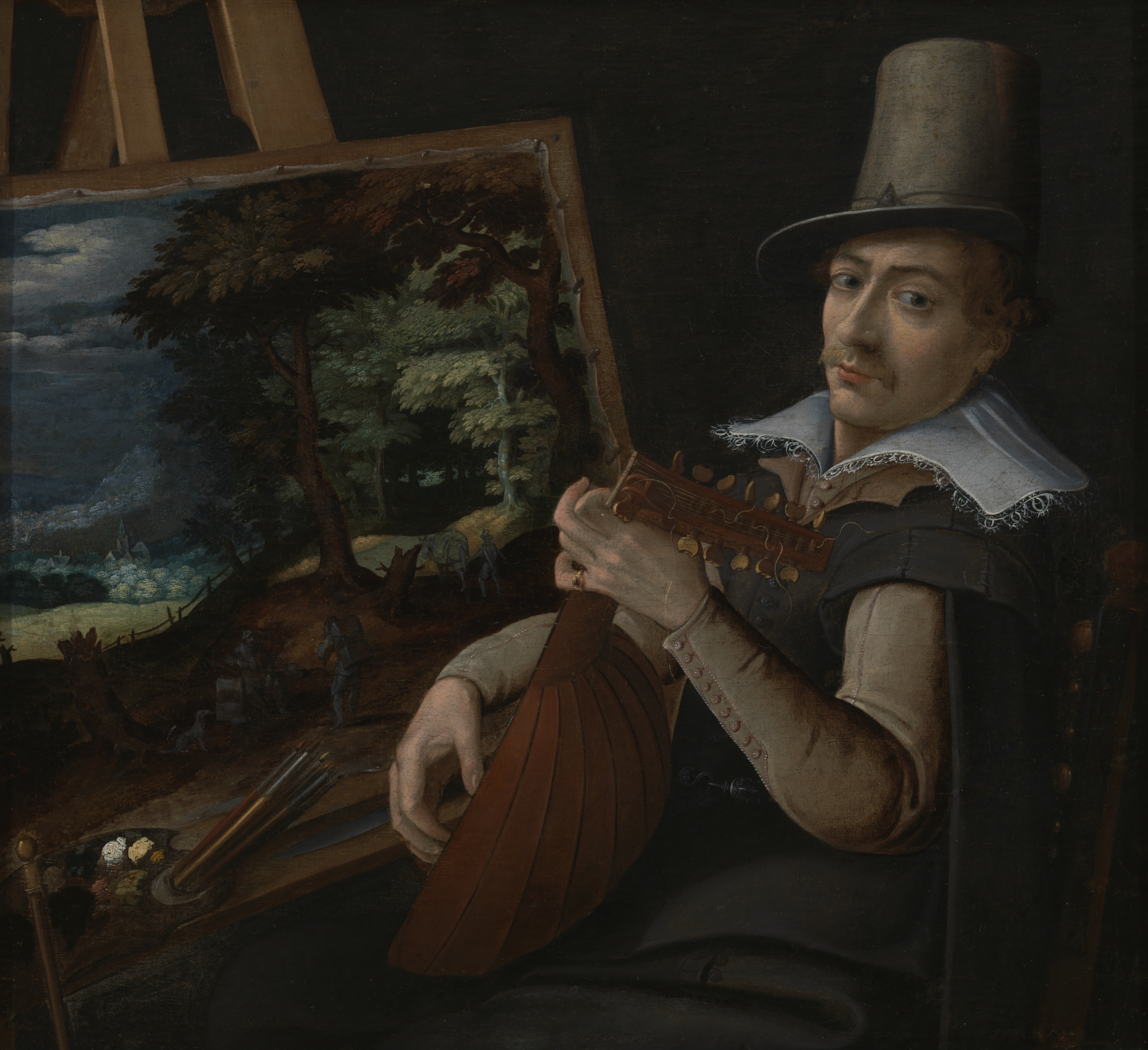
- Self-portrait by Paul Bril (c. 1595-1600)
- Born: 1553 or 1554 possibly Antwerp, Habsburg Netherlands
- Died: 7 October 1626; Rome, Papal States
- Known for: Painting, drawing, printmaking

Paul Bril (1553 or 1554 – 7 October 1626) was a Flemish painter and printmaker principally known for his landscapes. He spent most of his active career in Rome. His Italianate landscape paintings and drawings had a major influence on 17th century landscape painting in Italy and Northern Europe. He is credited as one of the pioneers of the wooded landscape in European art.

== Life ==
Bril is believed to have been born in Antwerp although it is possible his birthplace was Breda. He was the son of the painter Mathys Baertmaker (also given as Baermaker, Bargiemaker and Mathys de Caerdemaker) who went by the name Bril Janszone and his wife Anna Timmermans Petersdr. (died 1558). He had several siblings of whom Matthijs, Peeter, Jacques and Hans also became painters. The brothers likely started their artistic training with their father in Antwerp. Paul may also have been a pupil of the Antwerp painter Damiaen Wortelmans who was specialised in the decoration of harpsichords.

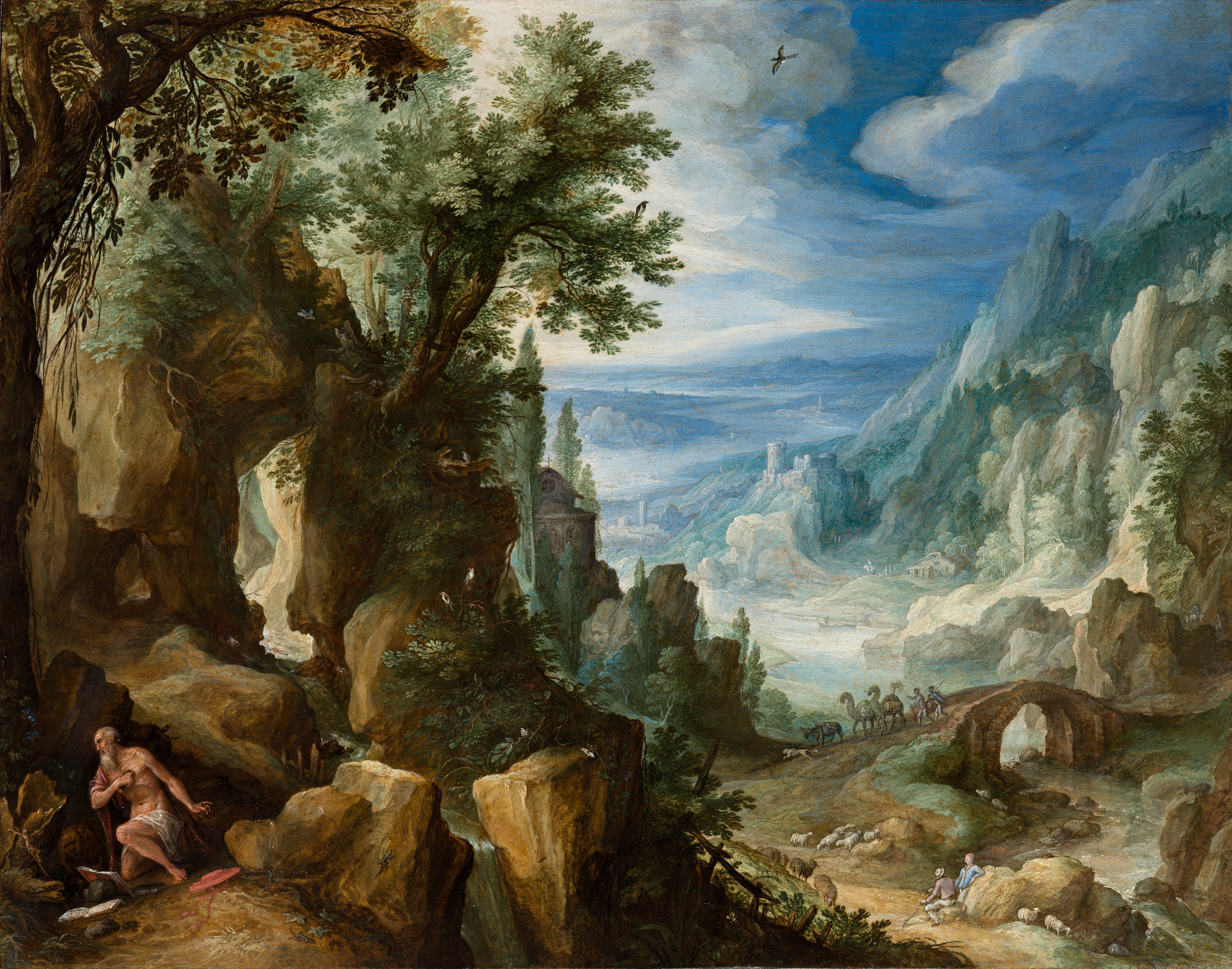
Mountainous Landscape with Saint Jerome, 1592

Paul left Antwerp in 1574 and first travelled through France where he took op residence in Lyon. He travelled before 1580 to Rome where he joined his brother Matthijs who had arrived in the city around 1575. He lived on the Via Babuino before moving to Via della Croce in 1582. He worked on several frescoes in the Vatican Palace as an assistant to his brother.

When Matthijs died in 1583, Paul likely continued his work, picking up many of Matthijs' commissions. In these works he relied on his brother's drawings. Paul's earliest known works date from the late 1580s. He established his reputation with commissions from Pope Gregory XIII in the Collegio Romano. He married in 1592 in Rome to Ottavia Sbarra (buried 29 September 1629). Their known children include Cyriacus (who also became a painter) and Dominica (buried on 17 February 1609).

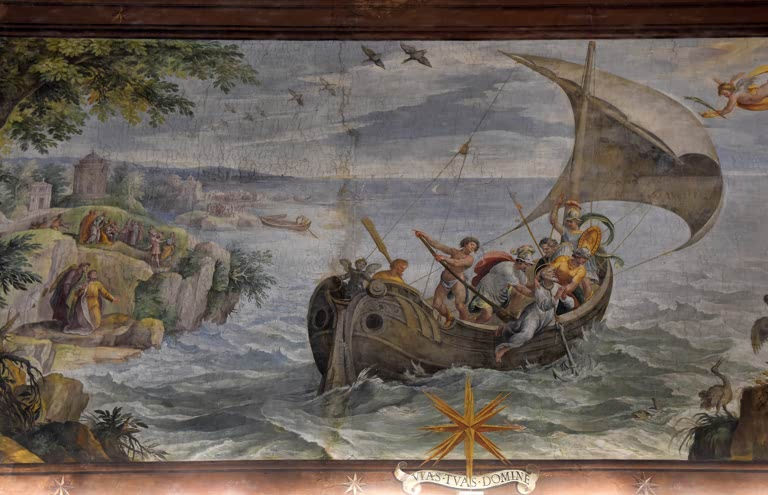
Martyrdom of St. Clement

Paul's success was assured after Pope Sixtus V became his principal patron. Bril was part of a team specialized in landscape painting and thus participated in almost every assignment which entailed decorative landscapes, such as in the Basilica di Santa Maria Maggiore, the Vatican Palace and the Scala Santa. Another important early commission was the fresco cycle in the Santa Cecilia in Trastevere in Rome of around 1599.

Pope Clement VIII continued the papal patronage and gave the artist a commission for a monumental seascape depicting the Martyrdom of St. Clement. Paul Bril completed this commission in the Vatican Palace's Sala Clementina in collaboration with the brothers Giovanni and Cherubino Alberti (1600–02/3). In 1601 Paul received another major commission, to paint a series of large canvases featuring properties of the Mattei family. Paul further painted landscape frescoes in the Casino dell'Aurora of the Palazzo Pallavicini-Rospigliosi in Rome. Pope Paul V (reigned from 6 May 1605 to January 1621) gave him a commission for landscape paintings in the Vatican palace.

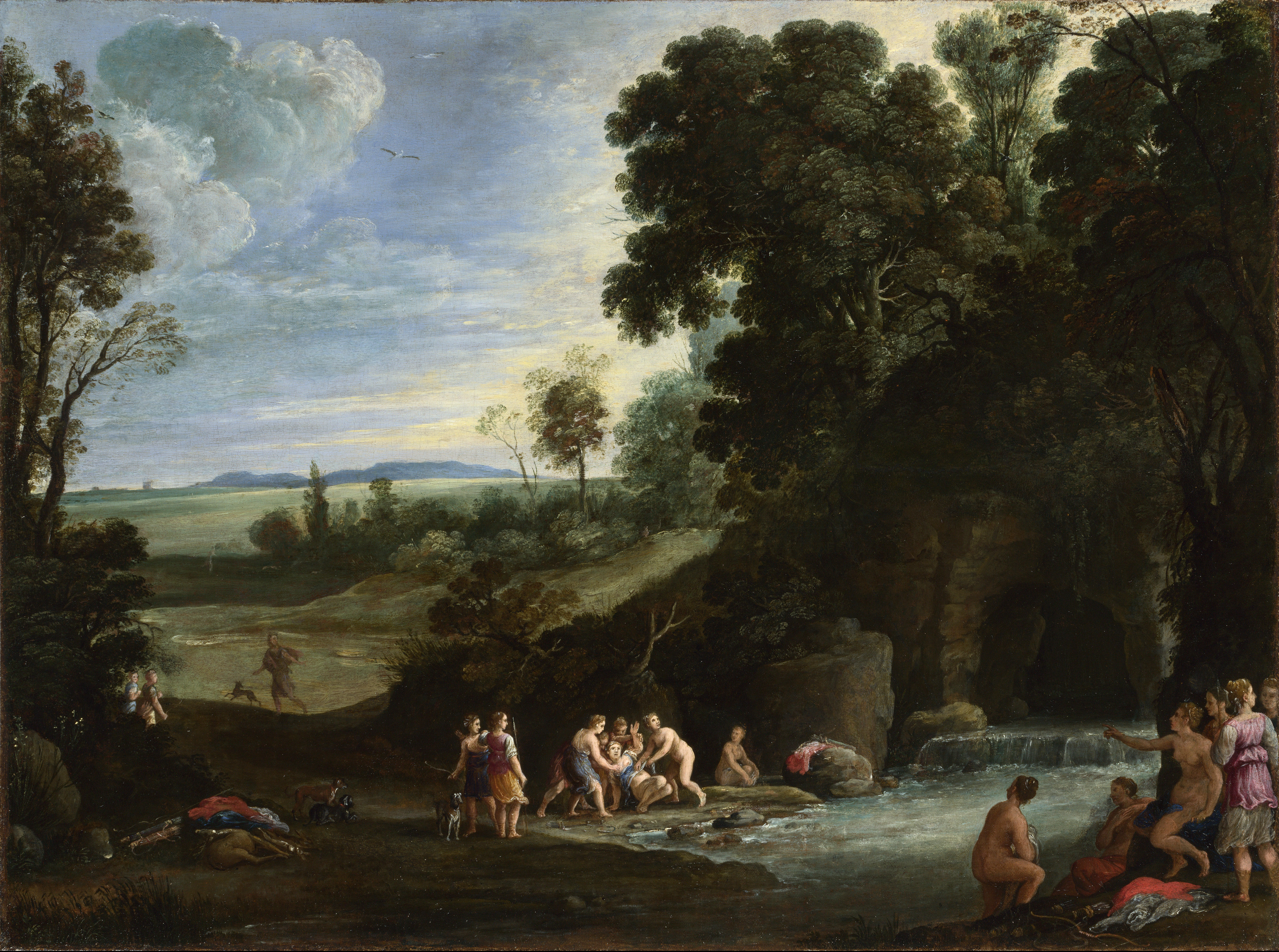
Diana and Callisto, probably 1620s

His patrons were among the most influential people in Rome and included members of the Colonna, Borghese, Mattei and Barberini families in Rome as well as Cardinal Federico Borromeo in Milan, Cardinal Carlo de’ Medici in Florence and Duke Ferdinando Gonzaga in Mantua. He was sought after not only for his fresco work, but also for his easel paintings and eventually also his drawings.

In 1621, Paul Bril became director of the Accademia di San Luca, the artists' academy in Rome. This was a clear sign of the high esteem in which he was held by his fellow artists in Rome as he was the first foreigner to hold this position.

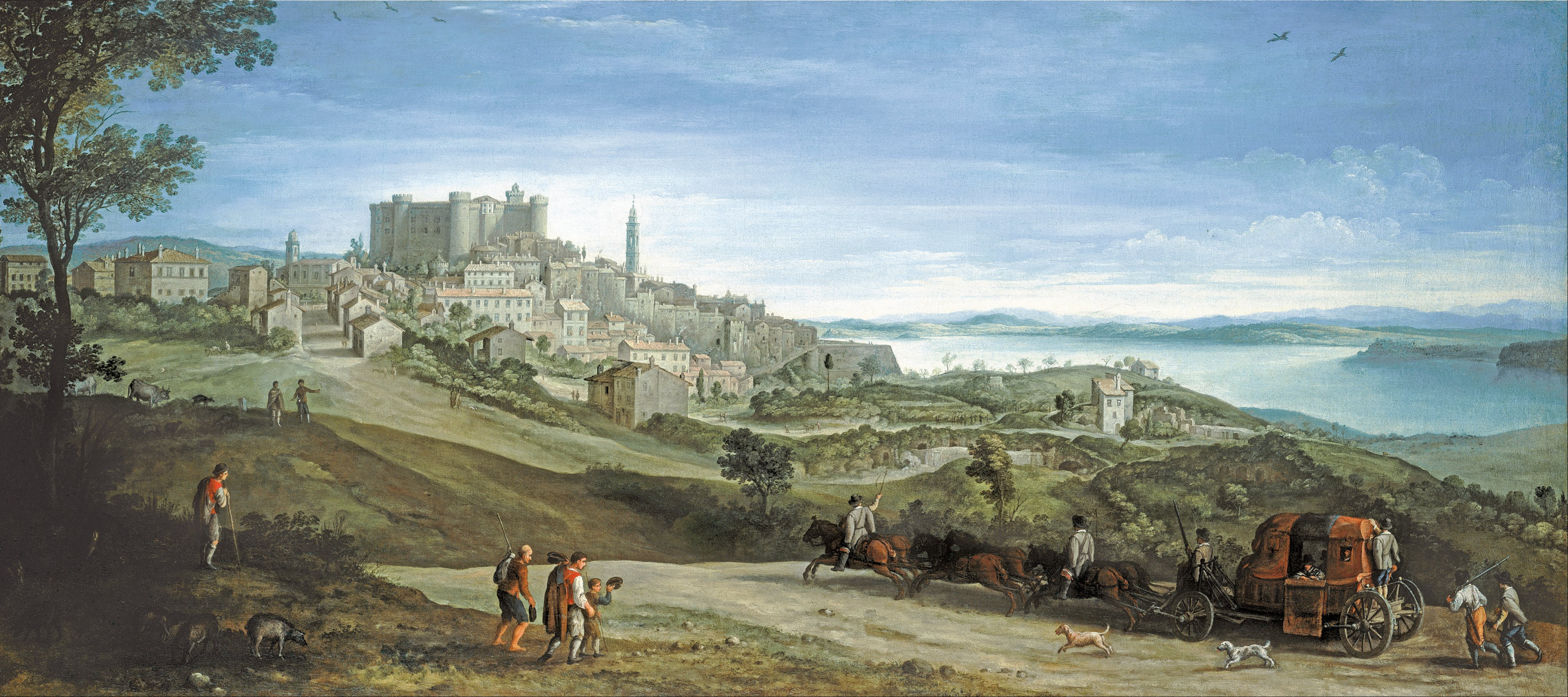
View of Bracciano, early 1620s

He had many pupils including his son Cyriacus Bril, Luigi Carboni, Balthasar Lauwers, Willem van Nieulandt II, Pieter Spierinckx, Agostino Tassi and Hendrick Cornelisz Vroom. Karel Philips Spierincks may also briefly have been his pupil.

Paul Bril died in Rome in 1626.

== Work ==
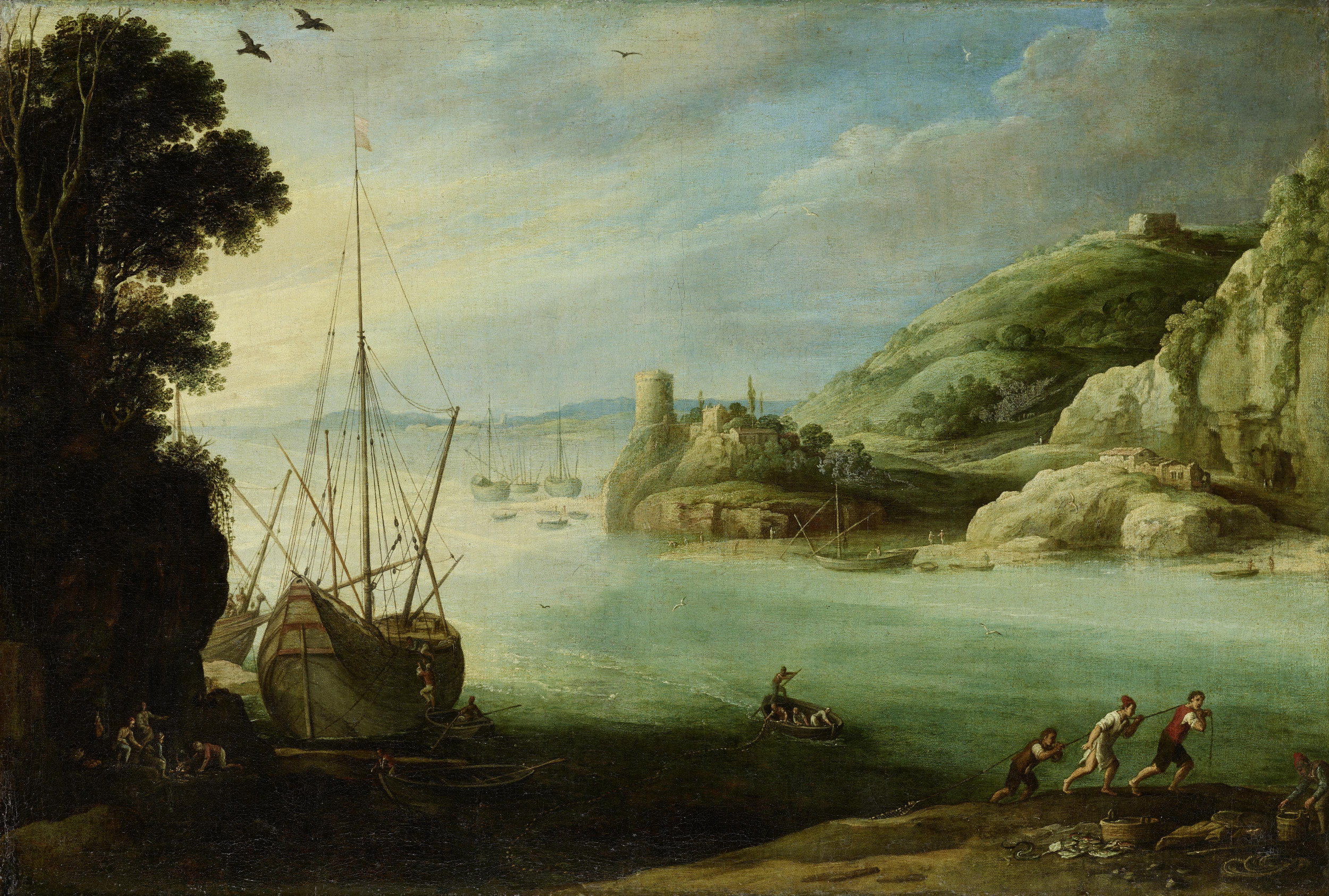
Mountainous Seashore, c. 1624, Gemäldegalerie, Berlin

Paul Bril initially painted in the late Mannerist style developed by his brother. These early landscapes are in the Flemish tradition inaugurated by Joachim Patinir and Pieter Bruegel the Elder and further developed by his own brother. Works from this early period were characterised by a picturesque arrangement of landscape elements and violent contrasts between light and dark. These early paintings also show strong contrasts of forms to create a sense of dramatic motion. Bril contrasted steep cliffs with chasms or dark, twisting trees growing from hills next to flat, sunlit pastures.

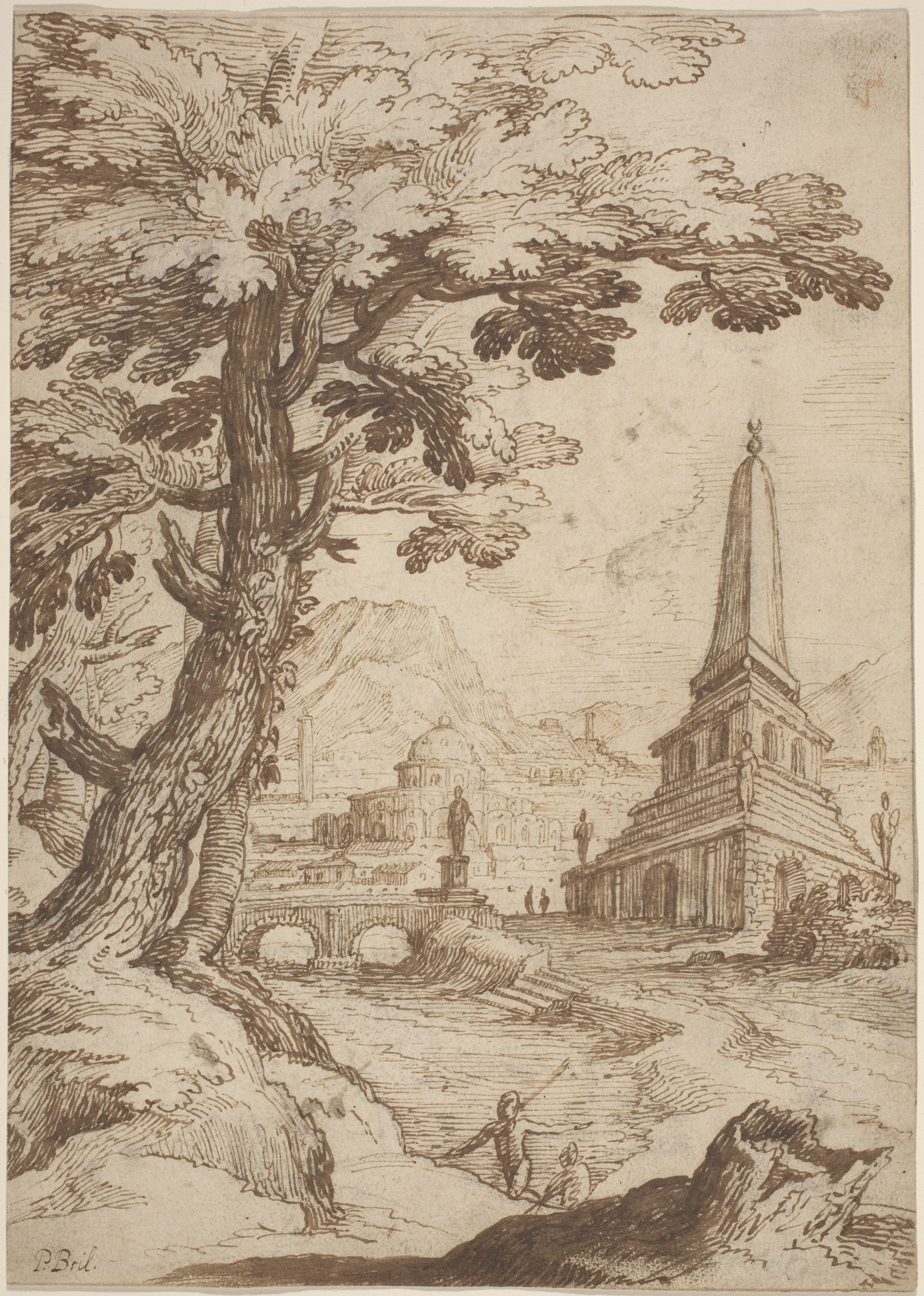
Heroic Landscape, 1595/1605

His style changed during his stay in Rome. Initially he worked in the Flemish tradition established by Joachim Patinir and Pieter Bruegel the elder. These works convey a sense of nature that is exuberant, dramatic and colorful by using high horizons and starkly contrasting bands of light and shadow to create a sense of depth. His compositions became calmer and his style more classicising around 1605. Where in the past, art historian assumed that these changes were a result of the influence of Annibale Carracci and Adam Elsheimer, it has been argued more recently that the influence was rather going in the other direction as Caracci and Elsheimer. and those two artist were The works from this period have lower horizons and less abrupt transitions from foreground to background. The subjects are typically pastoral or bucolic scenes and mythological subjects. This late style had a strong influence on the development of Flemish landscape painting and was crucial to Claude Lorrain's formation of the classical landscape.

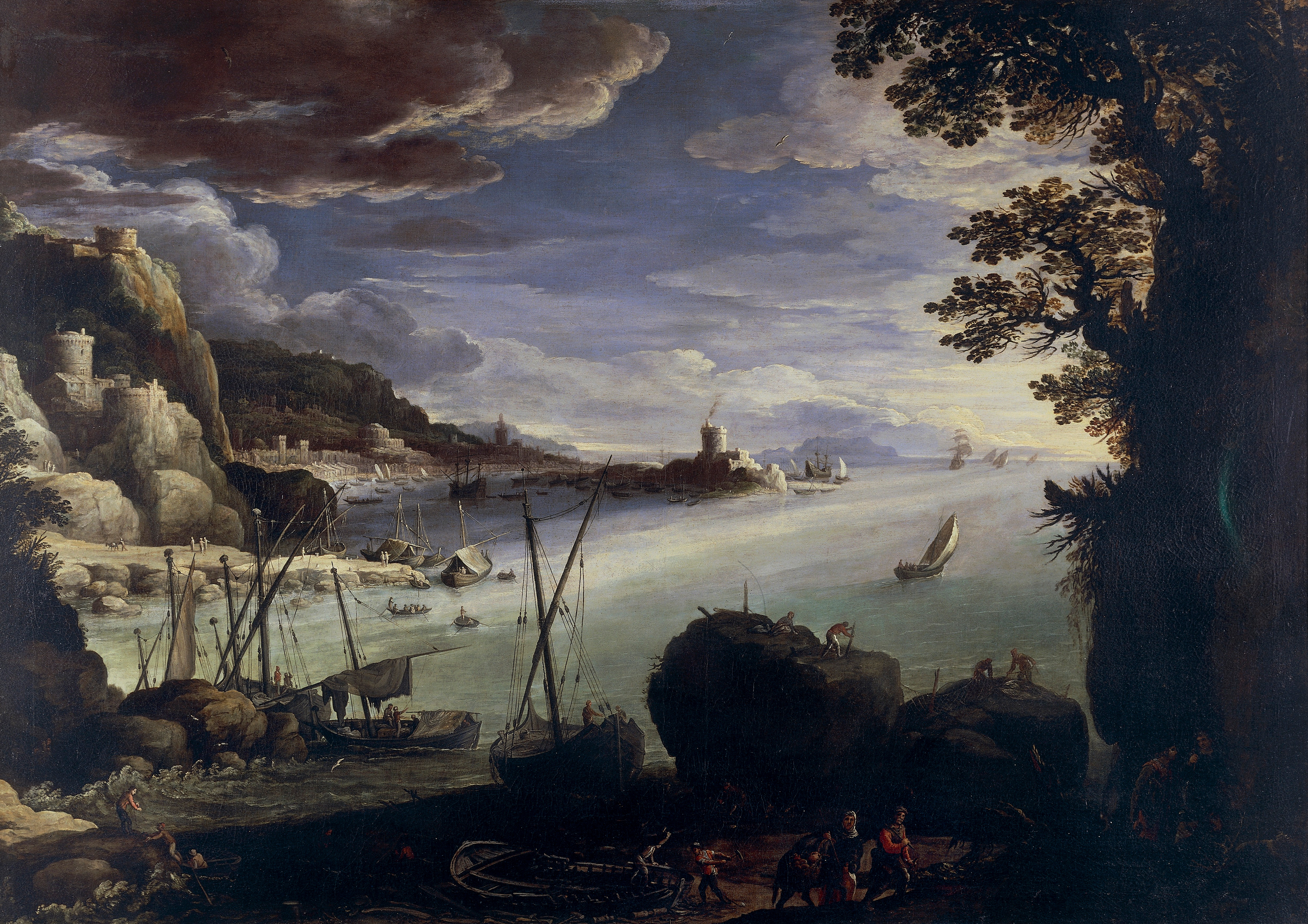
Landscape with a harbour, 1611

Agostino Tassi may have been Paul's pupil. Tassi later became the master of Claude Lorrain. Paul Bril thus forms one of the links between the panoramic views of Joachim Patinir and the ideal landscape evolved by Nicolas Poussin and Claude Lorrain. Bril is considered a precursor of the Dutch Italianates such as Cornelius van Poelenburgh and Bartholomeus Breenbergh, and, to a certain extent, of the Flemish and Dutch genre painters active in Rome known as the Bamboccianti.

Paul also painted small cabinet paintings on copper and panel commencing from the 1590s. Some of these he signed with a pair of glasses, a pun on the Flemish word bril which means "glasses". These small-scale paintings depicted subjects that he and his brother had rendered before on a large scale, such as tempestuous seascapes, hermits in the wilderness, travelling pilgrims, peasants among ancient ruins, hunters and fishermen.

A prolific draftsman, his drawings were popular with collectors and were copied by the many students who worked with him in his studio, which was a popular destination for Dutch and Flemish artists visiting Rome.

== Collaborations and artistic links ==
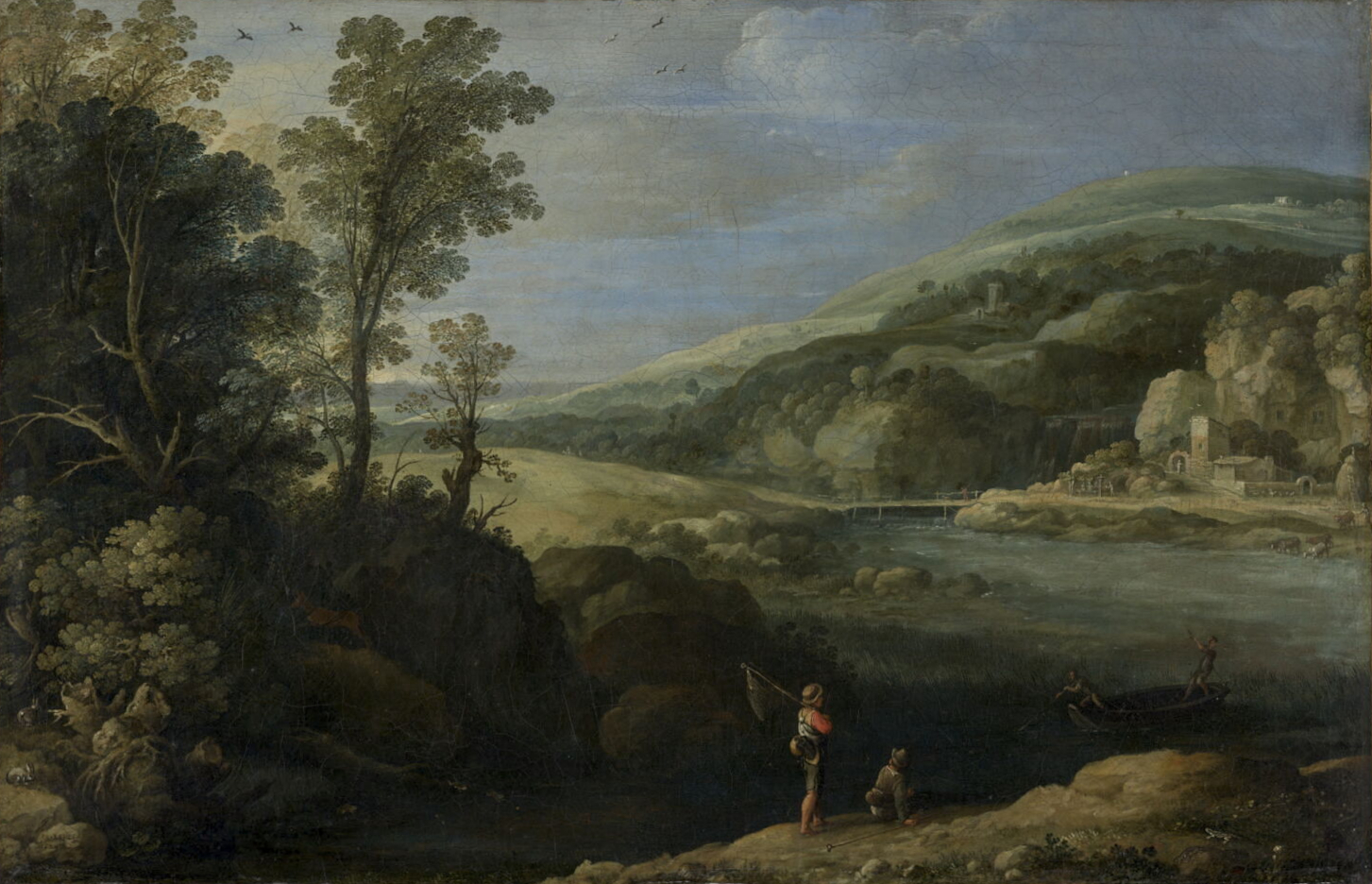
Landscape with Fishermen, 1624

He often collaborated on paintings with Johann Rottenhammer. According to a dealer's letter of 1617, Rottenhammer painted the figures in Venice and then sent the plates to Rome for Bril to complete the landscape. Bril also collaborated with his friends Jan Brueghel the Elder and Adam Elsheimer, whom he both influenced and was influenced by. His collaboration with Elsheimer is shown in a painting now in Chatsworth House.

Bril introduced Jan Brueghel the Elder to Cardinal Federico Borromeo, who subsequently became Brueghel's most important patron. He also let the Dutch landscape artist Bartholomeus Breenbergh live in his Roman residence for many years. The Antwerp artists Sebastiaen Vrancx and Willem van Nieulandt II were also affected by their contact with Bril's workshop in Rome.
