= Dentistry in ancient Rome =

Dental practices in ancient Rome

Dentistry developed during the early parts of Roman history, which may be due to the arrival of a Greek doctor named Archagathus. Ancient Roman oral surgical tools included the curettes, osteotomes, cauteries, scalpels, bone forceps, and bone levers. The ancient Romans invented the usage of narcotics during dental surgery. These tools were used to treat conditions such as toothache and to extract teeth. It was believed in ancient Rome that the cause of the conditions that necessitated such treatment was a "tooth worm".

== History ==
According to Pliny the Elder, a 1st-century Roman writer, an established medical community was absent for much of Roman history. During this time, medicine was confined to popular homemade remedies rather than professionally trained doctors. The profession of medicine was introduced to the Romans by the Greek doctor Archagathus, who traveled to Rome and established himself as a physician. Eventually, he garnered a reputation for violent use of steel and fire costing him his reputation and granting him the title of "butcher". Archaeological and historical evidence disputes this narrative.

The Twelve Tables—the set of legislation forming the basis of Roman law—mention teeth laden with gold, implying that dentistry had been practiced at this point in history. Other evidence includes the finding of prosthetic materials designed to treat dental and oral health conditions in Roman cities such as Teano. Dental tools have been unearthed at various Roman archaeological sites, indicating that dentistry became commonplace throughout the Roman world. It is unclear which Roman profession or professions would have performed dentistry. There may have been medical specialists trained to perform dental procedures, it is also possible that dentistry was practiced as a subset of other professions, such as barbery.

In the 3rd century, Saint Dionysius described the story of Saint Apollonia, who was allegedly brutally beaten by a mob of pagans. According to Saint Dionysius, the pagans knocked out her teeth and threatened to burn her if she did not blaspheme God. In response, she is said to have thrown herself into the fire. Afterwards, she became the patron saint of dentistry in Christian tradition. Analysis of teeth samples from the Roman era and the Early Middle Ages, shortly following the collapse of Rome, indicate the prevalence of dental lesions and caries rose during the transition to the Middle Ages. Similar evidence from Late Antique and Early Medieval Croatia suggests that rates of abscesses, caries, tooth loss, posterior teeth decay, and alveolar resorption rose during the early medieval period. However, the same evidence indicated that Late Antique Romans suffered from higher rates of anterior teeth decay, possibly due to non-dietary factors.

The Roman anatomist Galen commented on Hippocrates' work, classifying teeth as bones, noting their distinct characteristics compared to other bones. He was the first to discover nerves in teeth and identified seven cranial nerves in his research.

== Cosmetic dentistry ==
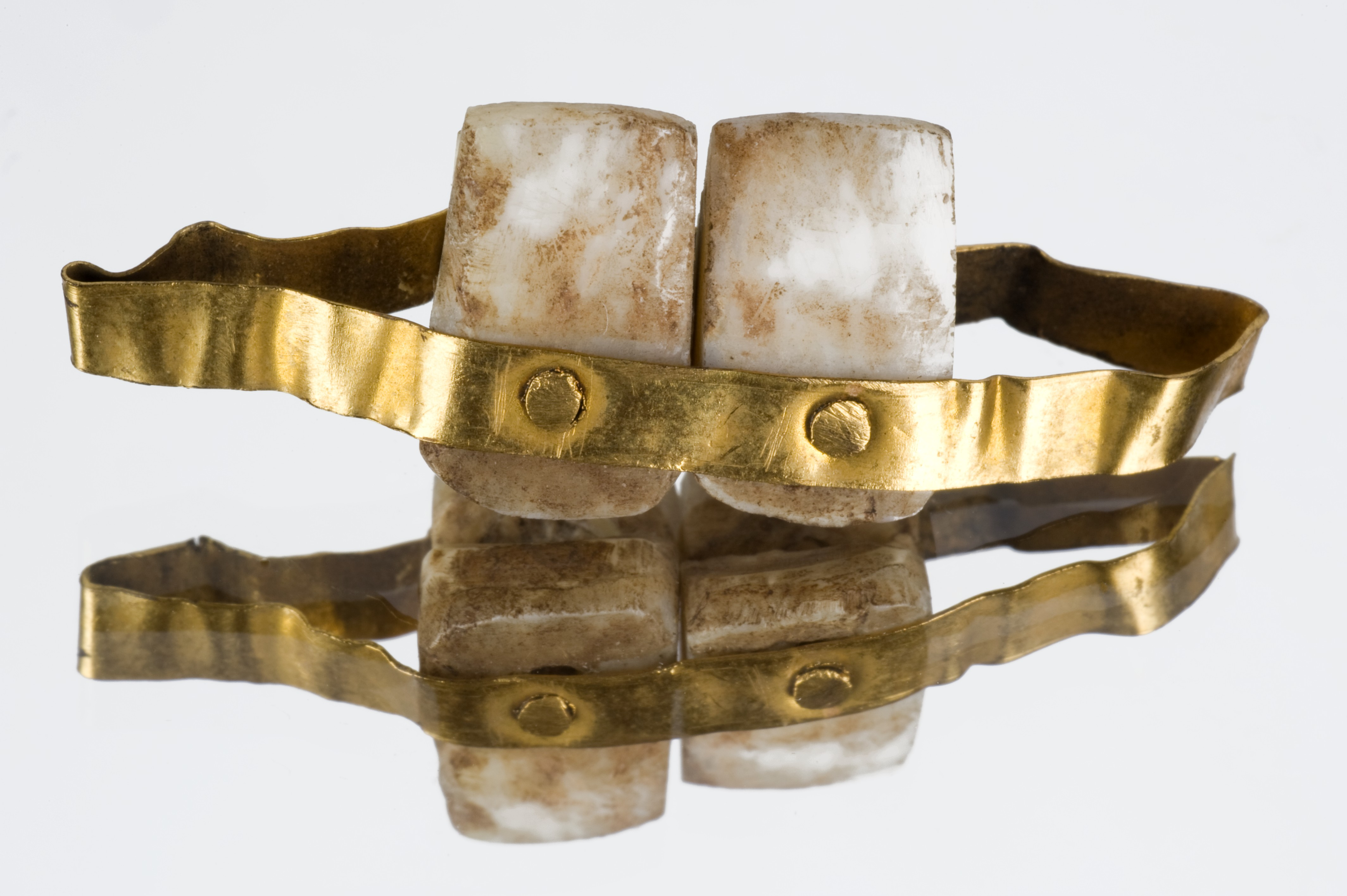
Etruscan dentures

The ancient Romans whitened their teeth using toothpaste made from human urine and goat milk. Scribonius Largus, a 1st-century Roman physician, claims Messalina—the wife of Emperor Claudius—used toothpaste made from mastic, salammoniac, and calcified stag horns. Toothpicks, known to the Romans as dentiscalpia, were also used for teeth cleaning; they were typically made of lentisk wood, although in some cases quill or gold were used instead. Pliny claims that toothpicks made from porcupine quills would harden the teeth, while vulture quills would sour the breath.

Dental prosthetics were first developed by the ancient Etruscan civilization in the 7th century BCE; in the following centuries, gold prosthetics remained in use throughout Etruria and Rome. However, gold dental prosthetics disappeared from the archaeological record by the Late Republic. The 1st-century Roman medical writer Celsus described a process in which physicians utilized gold or silk threads to tie teeth to the gums, allowing for dental implants to replace lost teeth. This same process could also be used to replace missing parts of existing teeth. The usage of golden implants is further depicted by Martial, who described the repair of broken teeth using golden stoppings. Cicero, a 1st-century BCE Roman politician, mentions a law forbidding corpses from being buried with gold, unless they had golden dental implants. Doctor of dental surgery and historian Bernhard Wolf Weinberger believed that such legislation indicated that golden implants were common, as otherwise he argues there would have been no need to specify it as an exception.

Celsus mentioned the possibility of replacing teeth using real teeth extracted from the corpses of the dead. Archaeological evidence of false Roman teeth dating to the 1st or 2nd century was possibly unearthed in a Gallo-Roman necropolis by the hamlet of Chantambre in Essonne, France. Excavators discovered the remains of an around 30-year-old Roman man with a metal implant by the second upper-right premolar tooth. The excavators argued that it was made of iron or non-alloy steel, although they believed it contained traces of calcium and silicon. Certain sections of the implant are more oxidized than other areas; the researchers believe this discrepancy indicates that the piece may have been forged through hammering and folding. However, the veracity of this find has been heavily criticized by archaeologist Dr. Marshall J. Becker, who argued that the finding was more likely a natural tooth stained with iron oxide. In his Epigrams, Martial often derides others for utilizing fake teeth: he ridicules a one-eyed prostitute for utilizing fake teeth and a wig, ridicules an old lady for her fake teeth made of bone and ivory, and mocks a girl named Maximina for her fake teeth made of boxwood and pitch. Martial describes a physician named Cascellius who worked by the Aventine Hill in Rome in the 1st century CE; this dentist is described as filling teeth with lead.

== Tooth anatomy ==
According to the Hippocratic text, De Carnibus, teeth were considered bones since they extended from the bones inside the head and mouth. The 2nd-century CE Roman surgeon Galen stated that the human body contained 32 teeth divided equally between the upper and lower jaw. He grouped these teeth into three categories: molars, canines, and incisors. Incisors, as described by Galen, were wide and sharp teeth used to cut through food. Galen wrote that there were four incisors in the front part of each jaw. There were also only four canine teeth; they had a wide base and were located on both sides of the jaws. Their name derives from supposed similarities to the teeth of dogs. Although Galen noticed the molar teeth, he failed to distinguish between molars and premolars. Galen further documented cases of individuals with 4 molars in each part of the jaw instead of 5, incidents of birth defects that resulted in abnormalities in molar teeth, as well as cases of people with excess molars. According to Galen, the formation of teeth begun inside the uterus and that their growth was completed after the skull bones had been shaped. Galen incorrectly claimed that teeth were the only example of innervated hard tissue.

== Medical techniques ==
=== Dental restoration ===
Pliny the Elder's Naturalis Historia (23–79 CE) contains references to filling materials used as fillers in hollow teeth. Roman gold crowns dated to 100 BCE have been found at the Satricum excavation.

=== Toothaches ===
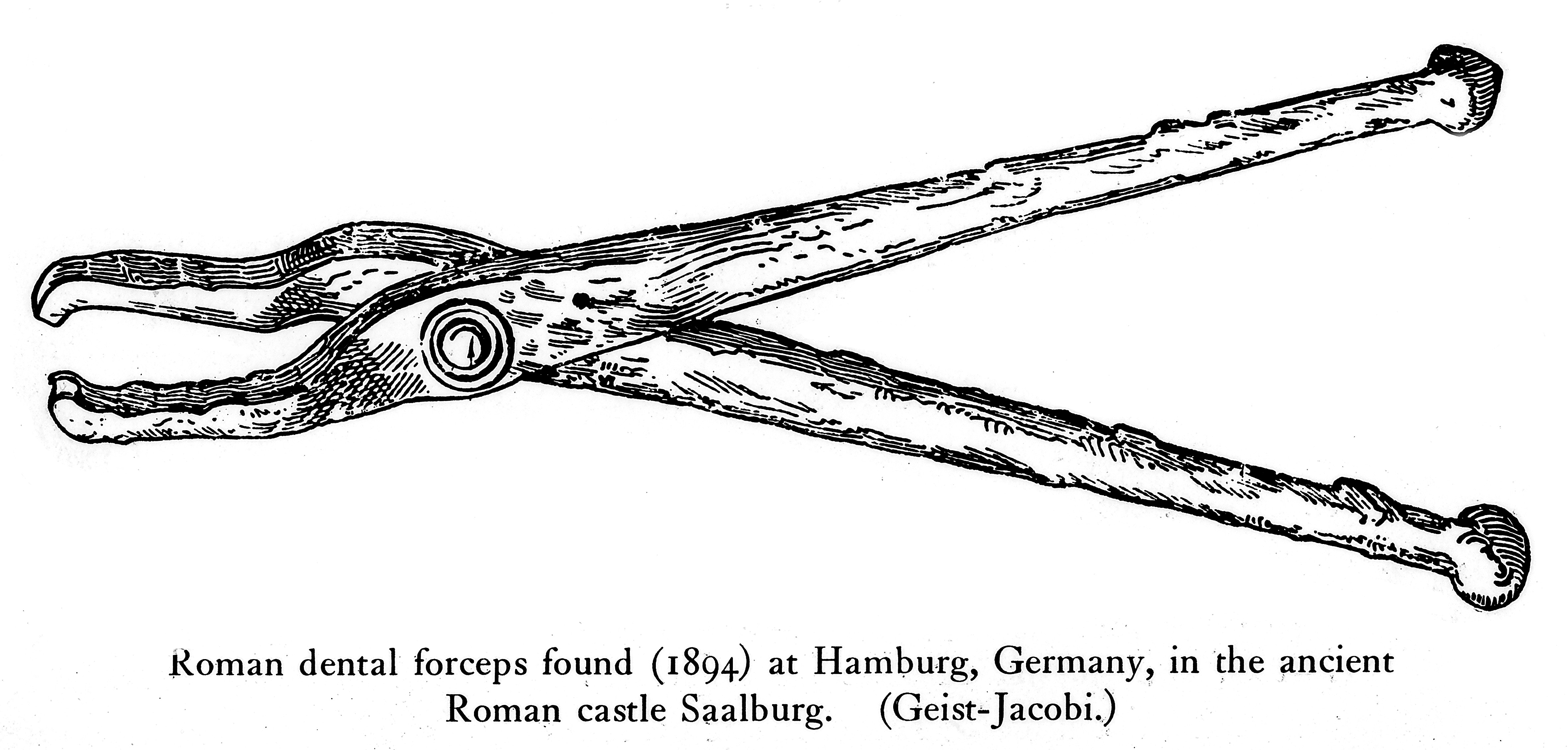
Ancient Roman dental forceps

Galen distinguished between diseases of the root and of the pulp in his work De ossibus, the same text in which he also identified the medical issue of a toothache. Around 100 CE, the physician Archigenes stated that tooth pain could be caused by a disease of the interior tooth leading to an inflammation of the gums. He attempted to treat this phenomenon by applying a small drill to the dental crown. Other Roman doctors believed that toothaches were caused by a "toothworm". Scribonius Largus believed that this condition could be treated by applying a scalpel to cut away at the infected teeth.

Treatments for toothaches were popular and widely desired due to the intense pain and dental decay this condition caused. In his work Natural History, the 1st-century Roman writer Pliny the Elder discussed therapies for tooth pain. He described various concoctions such as the ashes of burned earthworms, ashes of burned mice mixed with fenned roots and honey, sparrow feces wrapped in wool; snakeskin mixed with oil, resin, and pitch-pine and then poured into an ear. Pliny further describes a patient who, after receiving a treatment for a toothache consisting of wax and asafoetida, committed suicide. Celsus advises patients with toothaches apply a pad of wool and a sponge to the afflicted teeth, while abstaining from drinking wine and food initially; they would proceed to only eat soft foods to avoid irritating the gums. Medicaments such as saffron, opium, spider eggs, fried worms, pepper, and nardus paste may have been used as painkillers for toothaches.

=== Tooth decay ===
Archaeological evidence from the house of Julius Polybius in Pompeii revealed that amongst 11 skulls and 145 teeth, only 2 osteolytic lesions and 10 caries were identified. Another study on the skeletons of 41 adults and 12 children from Herculaneum revealed that only 3.8% of the 1275 teeth were carious. The relatively low rate of carious lesions amongst these samples could be attributed to the fluorine-rich water near each settlement. Analysis of a separate sample of 700 skeletons from the Via Latina revealed that although the majority of teeth were not carious, 70% of the samples had at least one carious lesion. Furthermore, 80% of the skeletons had tartar presence in the teeth and 26% had abscesses in the alveoli. Archaeological evidence from 77 skeletons in Viminacium dating to the 2nd to 4th centuries found that the dental health of the studied sample was comparable to modern data, with only 3.9% of the skeletons having carious lesions. Around 64% of the skeletons were afflicted with tooth abrasion, the most prevalent condition amongst the sample.

Excavations of a taberna by the Temple of Castor and Pollux unearthed a deposit of 86 teeth most of which are afflicted with carious lesions. Each tooth was unbroken, suggesting that they had been removed by a skilled dentist. Further analysis of these teeth revealed that the front of the cavities had hypermineralized areas, possibly indicating the usage of analgesics. Many of the teeth likely had the soft part of their carious sections removed prior to surgical treatment, leaving the cavities uniquely round or circular. Some examples of teeth from this site have the remains of dentin along the sections of pulp impacted by caries, suggesting that the pulp was preserved throughout the procedure until it was entirely exposed. Evidence from 1st-4th century Roman skeletons from a rural community in the province of Macedonia found extremely high rates of periodontitis and calculus, although low rates of caries. Similar studies on other rural Roman communities have found high rates of periodontitis, caries, periapical cavities, calculus, and tooth decay. Differences in the oral health between communities was likely strongly influenced by geography; different subsentence strategies affected diets and thus oral health. Menaeum, an ancient Roman community in Sicily, suffered from high rates of caries and calculus likely due to protein- and carbohydrate-rich diets. However, evidence from the necropolis near Vallerano revealed low rates of caries amongst it sample likely due to a primarily agricultural diet centered around products.

External stressors can lead to tooth decay by disrupting enamel development creating Wilson bands, a deformed type of Striae of Retzius. Analysis of 127 Roman skeletons from a Roman necropolis at Isola Sacra indicates that the Wilson bands were most prevalent from 2-5 and 6-9 months after birth, correlating with infant mortality rates in ancient Rome. Harsh external conditions can also lead to enamel hypoplasia, a condition defined by a lack of enamel. This defect is extremely common amongst Roman skeletons from Vallerano, most frequently appearing in the remains of individuals between 2 and 4 years old. These results indicate that the sampled skeletons were exposed to severe and stressful experiences in childhood. Comparisons of skeletons from the rural community of Lucus Feroniae and urban settlement of Isola Sacra revealed that the rates of enamel hypoplasia were similar, a fact possibly attributable to similar levels of metabolic stress affecting dental development. The urban population may have experienced similar harsh conditions to the rural settlement due to the effects of higher population density in urban sites such as increased disease spread.

=== Tooth extraction ===
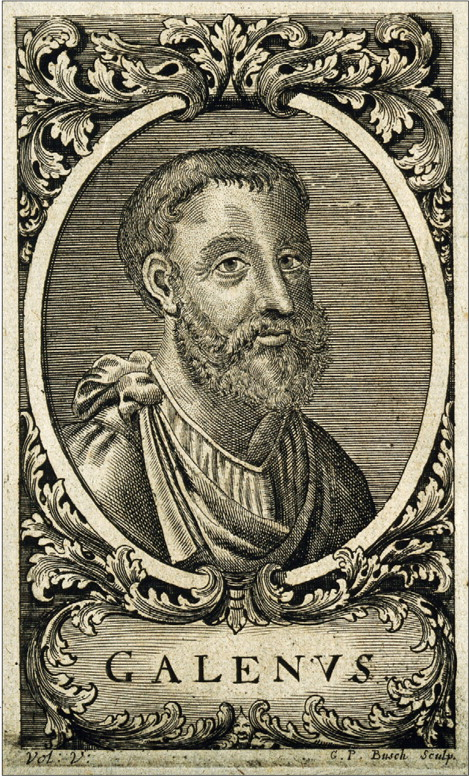
Portrait of Galen, a Roman doctor

Tooth extraction is an oral surgical procedure conducted to remove teeth. In ancient Rome, it may have been practiced by specialists who were not associated with any other Roman medical professionals. This practice presented numerous dangers for patients and challenges for physicians. Celsus recommends that physicians remove teeth straight to avoid risking the bone being broken by the roots. Extraction of teeth in the maxilla risked damaging the eyes and the temples; Celsus advises addressing this issue by making an incision into the gingiva, clearing the gum and bone around the tooth thus allowing for it to be extracted either by hand or using a forceps. The danger of this practice also resulted in it becoming rare; Celsus cautions physicians against the technique, advising that it should only be employed in herbal remedies had failed to address the issue.

Another practice involved cutting the gum to expose the root before extraction, followed by cauterization. Celsus advises that the cautery should be applied lightly, imposing little pressure on the gums. Afterward, the gums were covered with honey and washed with mead. According to Celsus, physicians should refuse to extract children's teeth unless they were preventing adult teeth from growing. If the adult tooth began to grow before the primary tooth had fallen out, then Celsus recommends the removal of the original tooth and for the new tooth to be pushed further into place by hand each day. He further writes that, if the root had been left behind, the physician should remove it utilizing a pair of forceps called a rhizaga. The rhizaga could also be used to remove a cavity, although according to Celsus this procedure should be performed after the cavity had been filled with a lead amalgam to ensure the dental crown remained intact. Celsus describes other tools called the specillum, a type of probe, and the vulsellum, used as a type of probe.

=== Gum disease ===
Ancient Roman medical writers believed that teeth could become loose due to root weakness or gum disease. They would treat this by cauterizing the gums, then covering it in honey swilled with mead. Afterwards, medication was placed on the teeth. If the tooth became painful it would be extracted. This procedure would be conducted by "scraping" the tooth in "round order" and then shaking the tooth until it could be safely removed. Celsus described a treatment for gum bleeding that involved chewing purslane and another therapy for mouth bleeding that involved drinking undiluted wine or vinegar. He further recommends that patients could chew on either apples and pears or vinegar to contain the juices within their gums. Pedanius Dioscorides, a 1st-century Greek physician, documented herbal remedies that functioned as drugs for gum disease and toothaches.

=== Dentures ===
As early as the 7th century BCE, Etruscans in northern Italy made partial dentures out of human or other animal teeth fastened together with gold bands. The Romans had likely borrowed this technique by the 5th century BCE. A text by Martial (c. 40–103 CE) referenced Cascellius, who extracted or repaired painful teeth. H. L. Strömgren (1935), postulated that by repairing it was meant tooth replacement and not tooth filling.

== Cleft lip and palate ==
Celsus described treatments for the medical condition known as cleft lip and palate. He wrote that applying a suture and abrasions to the lips was Celsus' suggested method of treating small defects. Larger and more problematic defects were treated using a surgical procedure known as flaps. Galen, another Roman doctor likely described either coloboma or facial cleft. To treat this condition, he recommended scarifying the skin and unifying the disparate parts of the skin, removing callouses, and then finishing the procedure through sewing and glue. It was believed that a healthy palate was necessary for proper speech.
