= Temple of Jupiter =

Jupiter was king of the gods in the ancient Roman religion. Numerous temples were dedicated to him in Rome and throughout the Roman Empire. Notable examples include:

- In Rome:
  - Temple of Jupiter Custos (Jupiter the Guardian), uncertain site
  - Temple of Jupiter Feretrius (Jupiter of the Spoils), uncertain site; the first temple built in Rome
  - Temple of Jupiter Optimus Maximus (Jupiter Best and Greatest), on the Capitoline Hill so also known as the Temple of Jupiter Capitolinus; the most important temple in Rome
  - Temple of Jupiter Stator (8th century BC) (Jupiter the Unmoving), in the Roman Forum; destroyed in the Great Fire of Rome
  - Temple of Jupiter Stator (2nd century BC), in the Campus Martius
  - Temple of Jupiter Victor, ruins on the Palatine Hill which until 1956 were thought to be a temple to Jupiter, but are now identified as the Temple of Apollo Palatinus
- Elsewhere:
  - Temple of Jupiter (Baalbek), in Heliopolis Syriaca, modern Lebanon; the largest temple dedicated to Jupiter
  - Temple of Jupiter, Damascus, modern Syria
  - Temple of Jupiter Olympius, Athens; dedicated to Zeus, the Greek equivalent of Jupiter
  - Temple of Jupiter (Pompeii), buried by the eruption of Mount Vesuvius in 79 AD
  - Temple of Jupiter (Silifke), modern Turkey
  - Temple of Jupiter, Split, modern Croatia
  - Temple of Jupiter Anxur, in Terracina
  - Temple of Jupiter Capitolinus, atop the ruins of the Jerusalem Temple, built probably after the Bar Kokhba Revolt of 132–135 CE
