= Calza =

Calza is a surname. Notable people with the surname include:

- Antonio Calza (1658–1714), Italian painter of the Baroque period
- Giorgio Calza (1900–1970), Italian wrestler
- Guido Calza (1888–1946), Italian archaeologist
- Raissa Calza (1894–1979), Ukrainian dancer and classical archaeologist
