= Isola Sacra Necropolis =

Large-scale pagan cemetery in Rome

Isola Sacra
- Necropoli di Porto
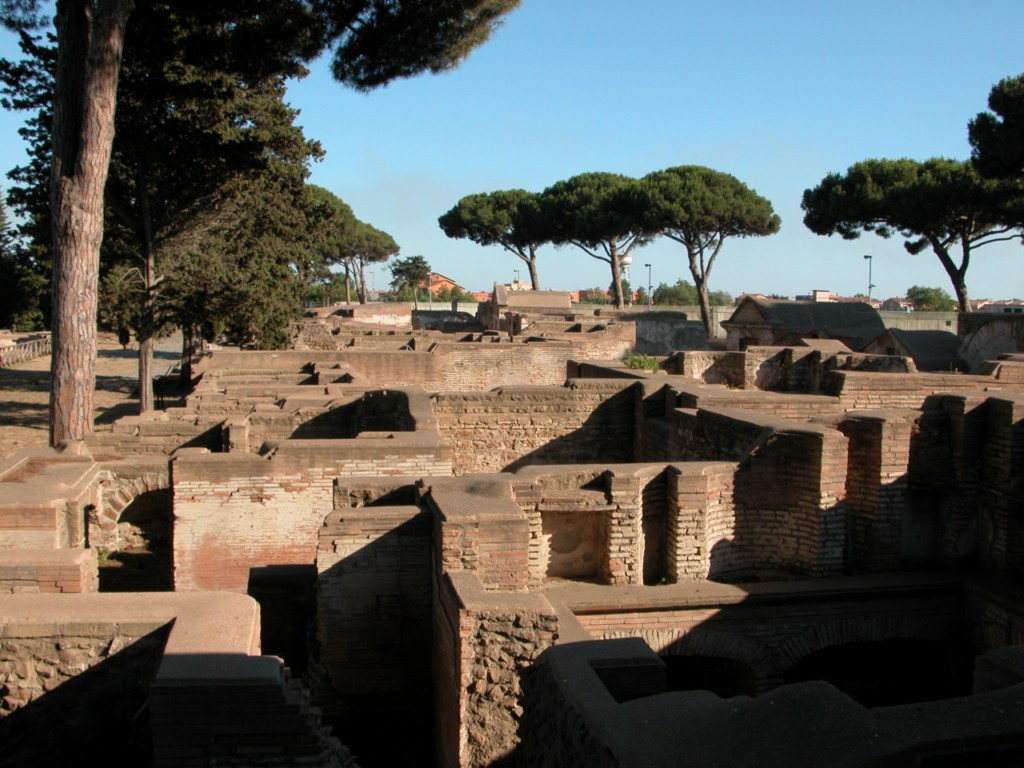
- Necropolis of Portus

- Location within Lazio
- 41°46′10″N 12°15′50″E
- Type: Necropolis
- Periods: Roman Republic - Roman Empire
- Cultures: Ancient Rome
- Location: Comune di Fiumicino, Lazio, Italy
- Region: Lazio

History
- Built: first century AD
- Abandoned: sixth century AD

Site notes
- Archaeologists: Guido Calza
- Management: Archaeological Park of Ostia Antica
- Public access: yes
- Website: ostiaantica.beniculturali.it

The Isola Sacra Necropolis or Necropolis of Portus in the Isola Sacra was the first large-scale pagan cemetery of Roman Imperial times to be excavated. The excavator-in-chief of most of Isola Sacra was Guido Calza. The necropolis was found on the manmade island of Isola Sacra, which lies between the cities of Portus and Ostia Antica, a region just south of Rome. The emperor Trajan was in power when this artificial island was created. Much of the excavated necropolis flanked the Via Severiana, which ran through Isola Sacra and traveled southeast from Ostica to Terracina.

The cemetery was extensive, and was comparable to Etruscan cemeteries and Christian catacombs. Although some tombs were constructed for the very poor, the majority of burials were built by the middle class bourgeoisie of the area. Since the burial grounds were constructed during the 2nd century and first half of the 3rd century, a historical transition is seen in the necropolis from the pagan practice of cremation to inhumation.

== Importance of Necropolis to Imperial Art ==
The necropolis also provides insight into the history of Roman Imperial Art, as paintings, mosaics, and sculptures come from 3 different imperial reigns: Hadrian, the Antonines, and the Severan Dynasty. By the first half of the 4th century, the Necropolis was abandoned, and by the 6th century, the burial grounds were covered with sand. The original inscriptions, found on marble slabs, provide information regarding the occupations of those whom the cemetery accommodated. The Necropolis housed generally humble professionals, including shopkeepers, traders, workmen, shipowners, and porters. Families, however, built very elaborate burial homes for their dead relatives despite their humble backgrounds.

The discovered tombs at Isola Sacra provide useful information regarding the study of bourgeois taste in painted walls. Besides paintings, there were numerous sculptures found at the Necropolis, varying in artistic merit and content. Exquisite sarcophagi exist, including one of a child with revelling putti, or a winged babies, and one of the Archigallus, or head priest, of the island. In contrast, simple terra cotta, or ceramic, reliefs have been painted on tombs to show the professions of the deceased. Non-sepulchral sculptures found in the tombs could have been family heirlooms that were hidden in the burial grounds during a time of barbarian attack.

== Graeco-Oriental Influence ==
A great number of the inscriptions on the tombs suggest Graeco-Oriental origin. Scholars believe this is because Portus and Ostia were cosmopolitan towns where the bourgeois population was full of businessmen of non-Italian birth. Latin, however, was the language that most townspeople used during the time that the necropolis was built. Nonetheless, the presence of Graeco-Oriental inscriptions, along with Isola Sacra tombs that resembled Hellenistic tombs of Petra, suggests Roman naturalization of foreign influence, which was prominent in the Empire.
