= Via Severiana =

Ancient Roman road in central Italy

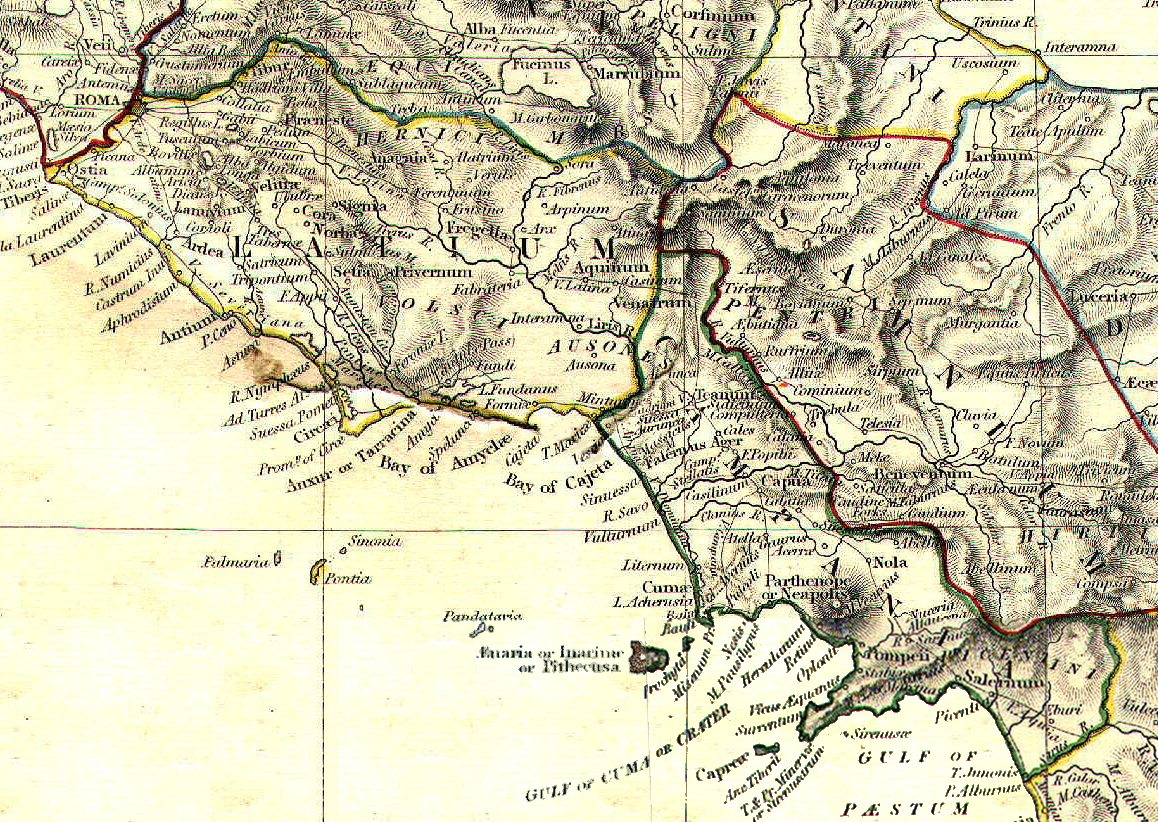
- The route of the Via Severiana in Latium
- Type: Roman road
- Periods: 198–209 AD
- Location: Portus to Tarracina

History
- Built by: Roman Empire, Septimius Severus emperor

Via Severiana was an ancient Roman road in central Italy leading in Latium (modern Lazio), running southeast from Portus to Tarracina (passing through the Isola Sacra), a distance of 80 Roman miles (c. 118 kilometres (73 mi)) along the coast. A restoration and reunion of existing roads was carried out with a work of lastrification in 198–209 AD, during the reign of emperor Septimius Severus (from which the road would have taken its name), in order to connect more quickly the maritime towns of Ostia, Lavinium, Ardea, Antium and the routes that came there from Rome.

Thomas Ashby said that it would have run along the shore only at first: just behind the line of villas which fronted the sea – which are now some 1 kilometre (0.62 mi) inland – or even upon its edge (for an inscription records its being damaged by the waves); farther southeast the road would seem to have kept rather more distant from the shore, and it probably kept within the lagoons below the Circean promontory.

Although the remains of the via Severiana are scanty, there are traces of at least two Roman bridges along the road: on the border between Laurentum and Ostia there was one, which according to an inscription was restored by the emperors Carus and Carinus, and the second one is located in the area of Torre Astura (ancient Astura).

The Tabula Peutingeriana, a map considered datable to the 4th century AD (or ca. 250 AD), shows an anonymous Roman road that crossed several stations (stationes), including Hostis (Ostia, the starting point), Laurentum, Lavinium, Antium, Astura and Tarracina (Ardea is not present). According to an orientation, the road represented in the Tabula would be only apparently coastal (it was considered that the stretch that ran from Lavinium to Antium would have been internal), therefore unidentifiable with the Via Severiana, which instead, according to a theory, never detached from the sea.

It was also believed that the name Severiana attributed to the road would be actually a modern conception.

== See also ==
- Roman road
- Roman bridge
- Roman engineering
