= Anxurus =

Anxurus was an Italian divinity, who was worshipped in a grove near Anxur (modern Terracina) together with the goddess Feronia. He was regarded as a youthful Jupiter, and Feronia as Juno. On coins his name appears as "Axur" or "Anxur". There exists in Terracina the ruins of a temple to Jupiter Anxurus.
