= Lucius Cassius Hemina =

Roman historian

Lucius Cassius Hemina (fl. mid-2nd century BC) was a Roman historian.

== Life ==
Little is known of his life. He apparently composed his annals in the period between the death of Terence and the revolution of the Gracchi.

== Work ==
L. Cassius Hemina is principally known for his Annals (Latin: Annales) or History of Rome, which were composed in Latin and comprised four books. His account ran from the city's legendary origins up to 146 BC.

Hemina's annals include the earliest account concerning the bravery of G. Mucius Scaevola. He also described the arrival in Rome of the Greek physician Archagathus.

The fragments of Hemina's works have been edited by Peter in Historicorum Romanorum Fragmenta and more recently in a separate edition with commentary by Carlo Santini.

== See also ==
- Annals & Annalists
