= Raissa Calza =

Ukrainian archaeologist of Ostia Antica, ballet dancer, and actor

- Born: Raissa Samojlovna Gourevitch; 28 December 1894; Odessa, Ukraine
- Died: 24 January 1979 (aged 84); Rome, Italy
- Burial place: Ostia, Lazio, Italy
- Other name: Raissa Lork
- Education: École du Louvre
- Occupations: Ballet dancer; actor; archaeologist
- Spouses: Georgij Krol', Giorgio de Chirico, Guido Calza
- Awards: Italian Medal of Merit for Culture and Art, 1967

Raissa Samojlovna Calza (née Gourevitch; 15 December 1894 – 24 January 1979) was a Ukrainian dancer who became a prominent classical archaeologist of Roman portraiture. When she was young, she fled to Italy and France following the Russian Revolution.

After studying archaeology at the École du Louvre, she returned to Italy and began working at the Ostia Antica excavation site, where she met her third husband Guido Calza. She published many books on the archaeological sites in Ostia and was recognized for her efforts with a gold Italian Medal of Merit for Culture and Art on 2 June 1967. She died in 1979 and was buried at the Church of Sant'Ercolano near Ostia Antica.

== Early life ==
Raissa Samojlovna Gourevitch was born in Odessa on 15 December 1894, to a wealthy Ukrainian Jewish family. Her parents, Samuil and Berta, owned estates in Poland and Finland, but Gourevitch grew up in Saint Petersburg until 1918. After studying and at the suggestion of her father, Raissa became a dancer and actress. In the Russian theater scene, she met her first husband Georgy Krol' (1893–1932), a Russian Jewish director.

Following the Russian Revolution, Gourevitch and Krol' were forced to flee Ukraine and they immigrated to Turin, Italy, in 1919. As a couple, they traveled often to produce or act in theater productions—they lived in Rome from 1920 to 1921 and then in Berlin from 1921 to 1922.

In 1923, in Rome, Gourevitch was offered the opportunity to be the lead ballerina for a production of L'Histoire du soldat directed by Hermann Scherchen at the Teatro degli Undici. The artist Giorgio de Chirico saw the production and invited her to play the lead in a production of The Death of Niobe—a surrealist "mime tragedy" that he was producing with his brother Alberto Savinio. Gourevitch accepted the lead and performed under the pseudonym "Raissa Lork" on 14 May 1925; her husband designed the set and de Chirico the costumes (Raissa was dressed as Pierrot). Gourevitch and Krol' traveled together with a theatre troupe at the end of 1924, but at the end of the trip, Gourevitch left Krol' and moved to Paris. She married De Chirico shortly after in 1925.

In Paris, Gourevitch studied archaeology at the École du Louvre, taking classes taught by Charles Picard, although she never received a formal degree. She and De Chirico continued to travel often as De Chirico worked on sets for theatre productions, but their marriage ended in 1930 when de Chirico eloped with Isabella Pakszwer Far. Gourevitch divorced de Chirico in 1931, and then returned to Rome.

== Career ==
Because of her lack of formal qualifications, Gourevitch couldn't find work as an archaeologist, but became a photographer and assistant at the Ostia Antica site near Rome in 1937. There she worked under the superintendent of the excavations, Guido Calza. They married in 1945, but Guido Calza died only a year later in April 1946. Raissa Calza was active at the Ostia archaeological site from 1935 to 1968.

One of Calza's early successful publications was her account, in 1949, of the Ostian "Sanctuary of Cybele", which had been excavated during the early 1940s. By 1950, through her work at the site and her many publications, Calza became known as an expert in Roman portraiture and sculpture, particularly funerary sculpture.

Marguerite Yourcenar visited Calza in Ostia while she was preparing a new illustrated edition of Memoirs of Hadrian between the end of 1951 and the spring of 1952, and the two kept up their correspondence after the visit. From 1 January 1956 to 3 January 1957, Calza helped the Gabinetto fotografico nazionale archive to organize and categorize its photographic collection of Roman statuary In 1958 to 1959, she was the first scientific collaborator with the Fototeca di Architettura e Topografia dell’Italia Antica.

Calza's writing as an archaeologist and academic was supplemented by her skill with languages: she knew Russian, French, Italian, English, and German. She was also known for discerning details in stereotypical classical sculpture, although the archaeologist Margaret L. Laird has criticized her work on sculptures in the Ostian "Sede degli Augustali" as "fraught with iconographic difficulties" for her misidentification of statues on the site as imperial cult portraits.

To recognize her contribution to Italian archaeology, Calza was conferred the gold Italian Medal of Merit for Culture and Art on 2 June 1967.

== Death ==
Calza died in Rome on 24 January 1979 in a nursing home run by the Sisters of Charity. She was buried at the Church of Sant'Ercolano near Ostia Antica, near her husband Guido.

== Archive ==
Calza left her photographs of Ostia and her personal library and letters to a foundation that divided her archive between the Ostia and the humanities library of the University of Siena. Most of the photographs of Ostia come from a period of extensive excavation undertaken at the direction of the government of Benito Mussolini from 1939 and 1942.

== Selected bibliography ==
- Calza, Raissa (1958). Scavi di Ostia III: Le Necropoli. Parte 1: Le tombe di età repubblicana e Augustea. Istituto poligrafico dello Stato.
- Calza, Raissa (1947). Museo Ostiense. Rome: Libreria dello Stato.
- Calza, Raissa (1955). Cronologia ed identificazione dell' "Aggripina" Capitolina. Rome: Tipografia Poliglotta Vaticana.
- Calza, Raissa; Nash, Ernest (1959). Ostia. Florence: Sansoni.
- Calza, Raissa (1964). Scavi di Ostia V: I Ritratti, Parte I: I Ritratti greci e romani fino al 160 circa d. C. Istituto poligrafico dello Stato, Libreria dello Stato.
- Calza, Raissa (1972). Iconografia romana imperiale. Da Carausio a Giuliano (287-363 d.C.). Rome: L'erma di Bretschneider.
- Pisani Sartorio, Giuseppina; Calza, Raissa (1976). La villa di Massenzio sulla via Appia : il palazzo, le opere d'arte. Istituto di studi romani.
- Calza, Raissa (1977). Antichità di Villa Doria Pamphilj. De Luca.
- Calza, Raissa (1978). Scavi di Ostia IX: I ritratti. P. 2: Ritratti Romani dal 160 circa alla metà del III secolo d. C. Istituto poligrafico dello Stato.
