= Temple of Jupiter Anxur =

Ancient Roman temple in Terracina, Italy

Coordinates: 41°17′28″N 13°15′35″E

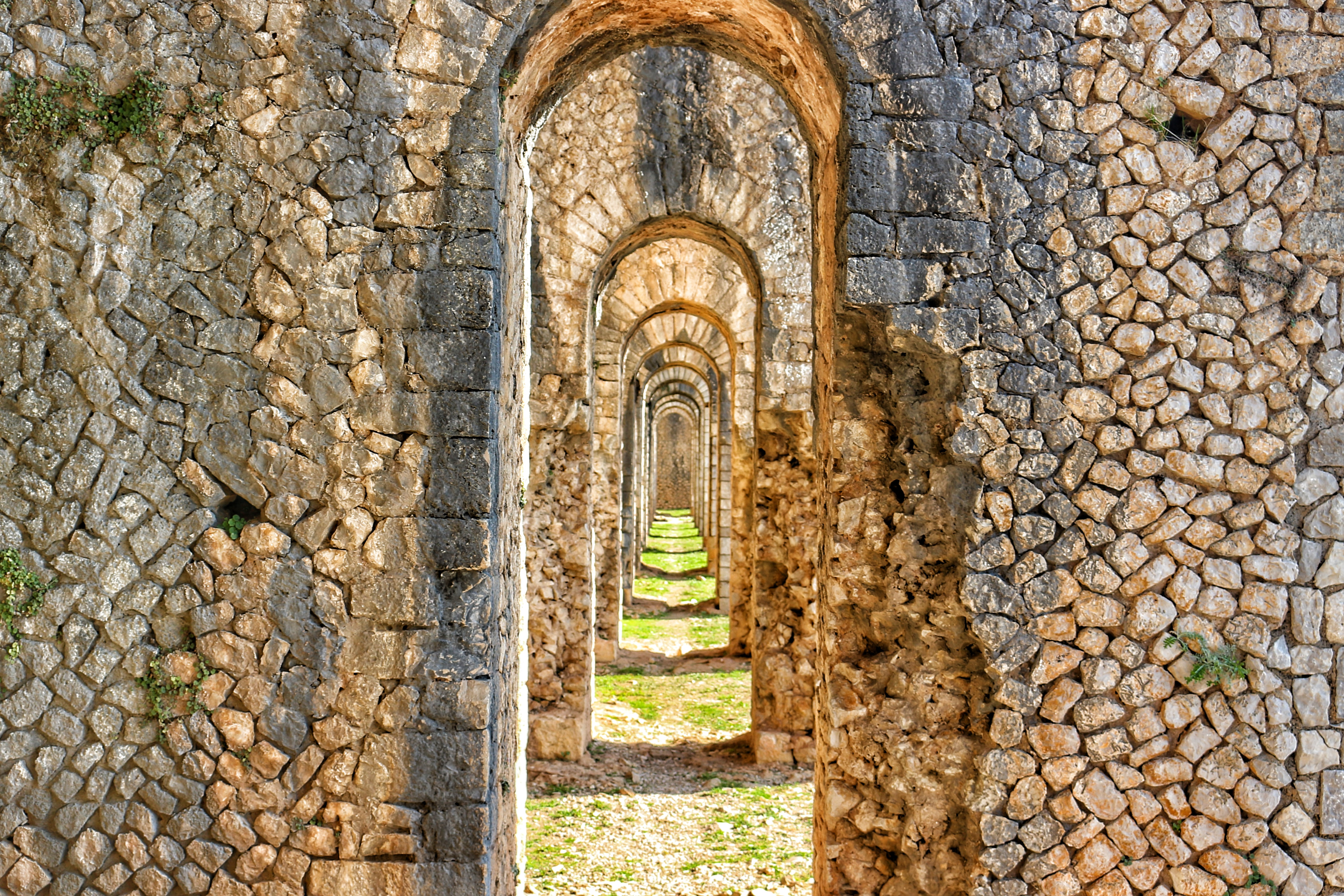
External corridor of the terrace on which the temple once stood

The Temple of Jupiter Anxur (Italian: Tempio di Giove Anxur) is an Ancient Roman temple that is located in Terracina, Italy.

The temple was built between the mid-second and mid-first century BC and is dedicated to Jupiter, who was the protector of Anxur. It was located along the Via Appia which passed through the city of Terracina and is situated atop Mount Sant’Angelo. The site is erected on top of a terraced platform that uses opus incertum. The largest temple is dedicated to Jupiter while a smaller temple dedicated to Venus Obsequens ("Indulgent Venus") sat next to it. After the Roman period, the sanctuary was destroyed. The remains were known in the medieval times as “Theodoric’s palace,” and in the early Middle Ages, a monastery dedicated to St. Michael the Archangel occupied the smaller temple. The interior was transformed into a church, and 9th-century frescos can still be found inside. The first excavations of the temple date to 1894 by Pio Capponi.

== Architecture ==
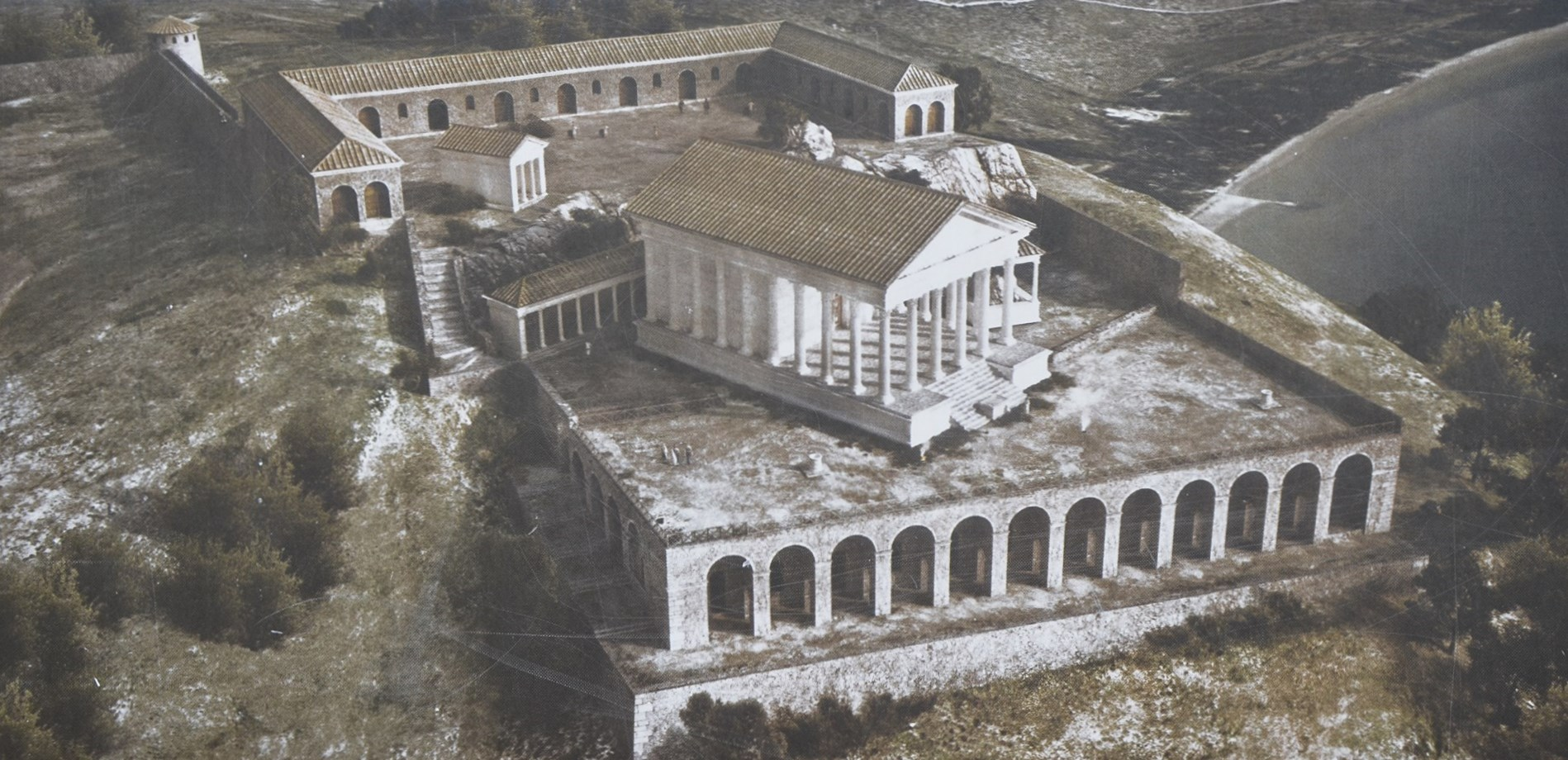
Reconstruction of the sanctuary

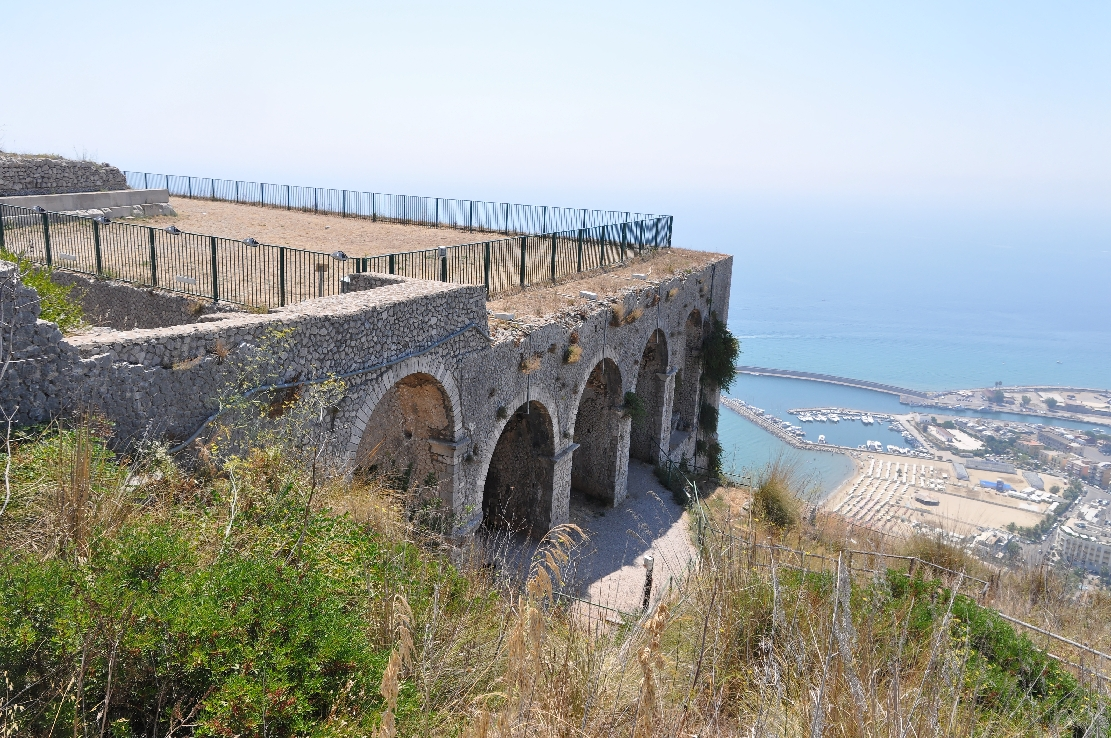
Modern day view

The temple was built on a previous place of worship. The complex consists of three terraces: the upper terrace, the middle terrace, and the lower terrace. The upper terrace is characterized by a long corridor that borders the square on three sides and opens to the south. The middle terrace houses the main temples of worship, and the base is made by a succession of twelve arches in opus incertum that is transversely connected to each other to create the illusion of a long corridor, which is still well preserved today. To the east of the cryptoporticus is an access to a small cave that probably connected with the oracular sanctuary. The large temple stood on a high podium and is oriented almost perfectly along the north–south axis with six Corinthian columns lining the front of the building and four on each side. The pronaos is almost as deep as the cella. Located behind the temple is a portico where traces of frescos can still be seen. Recently, the attribution of the temple to Jupiter has been questioned due to a few dedicatory inscriptions probably to Venus Obsequens.

== See also ==
- List of Ancient Roman temples
