= Portus =

Large artificial harbour of Ancient Rome

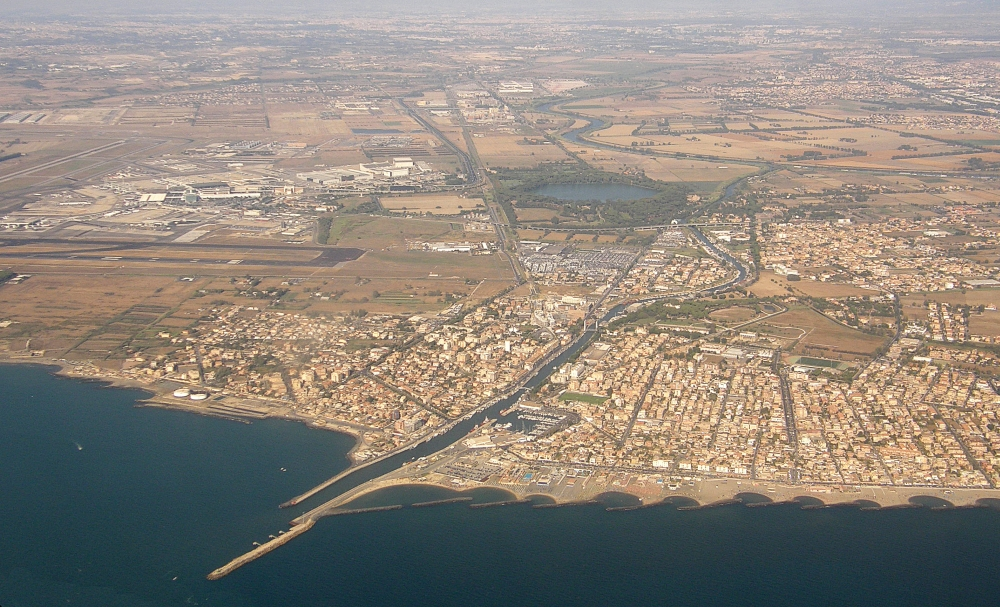
- The mouth of the Tiber, with the hexagonal harbour of Portus at upper middle (modern day "Lago Traiano").
- Click on the map to see marker
- 41.779°N 12.259°E
- Type: Settlement, Port
- Periods: Roman Republic; Roman Empire
- Cultures: Ancient Rome
- Region: Lazio

Site notes
- Excavation dates: yes
- Archaeologists: Guido Calza; Simon Keay
- Public access: Yes

Portus was a large artificial harbour complex of Ancient Rome located at the mouth of the Tiber on the Tyrrhenian Sea. It was established by Claudius and enlarged by Trajan to supplement the nearby port of Ostia.. At its maximum extent the complex covered an area of about 350 hectares and included many horrea and an imperial palace.

Portus was the main port of ancient Rome for more than 500 years and provided a conduit for everything from glass, ceramics, marble and slaves to wild animals caught in Africa and shipped to Rome for spectacles in the Colosseum.

The archaeological remains of Portus are near the modern-day village of Porto within the comune of Fiumicino, Lazio, just southwest of Rome.

== History ==
=== Claudian phase ===
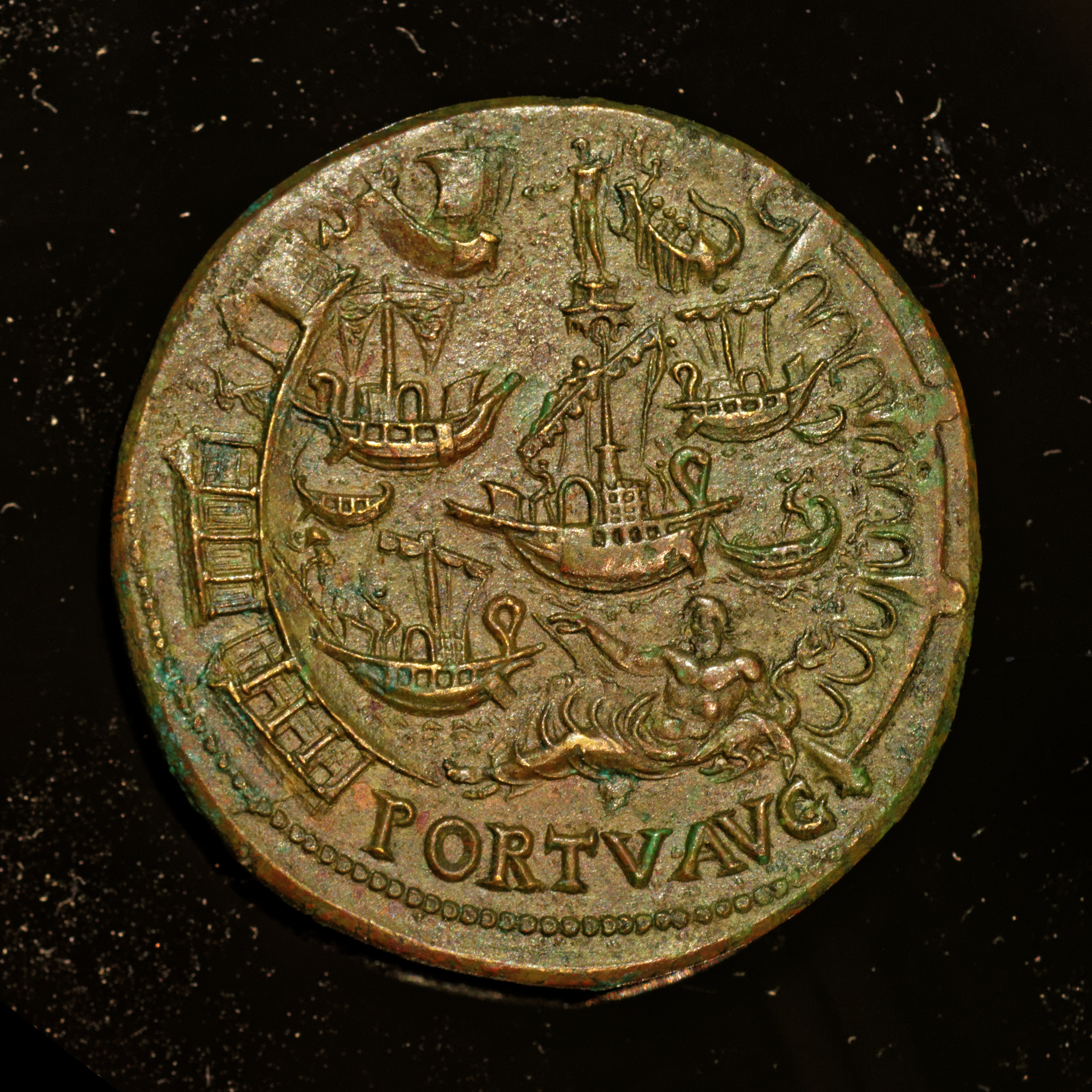
Nero's sestertius, circa 64: ships in Claudius's harbour. On the upper part, the lighthouse. On the lower part, Tiber with a dolphin

Ancient Rome's original port was Ostia located at the mouth of the Tiber on the Tyrrhenian Sea. The Tiber splits into two streams at its mouth, today roughly 1 mile before reaching the sea due to the constant silting from the mouth of the river, with Ostia situated on the larger southern stream but in Roman times the sea was much nearer to Ostia. Emperor Claudius constructed the first harbour on the Portus site, 4 km (2 1/2 mi) north of Ostia, enclosing an area of 250 ha (617 acres). According to Cassius Dio:

Claudius excavated a very considerable tract of land, built retaining walls on every side of the excavation, and then let the sea into it. Secondly, in the sea itself he constructed huge moles on both sides of the entrance and thus enclosed a large body of water, in the midst of which he reared an island and placed on it a tower with a beacon light

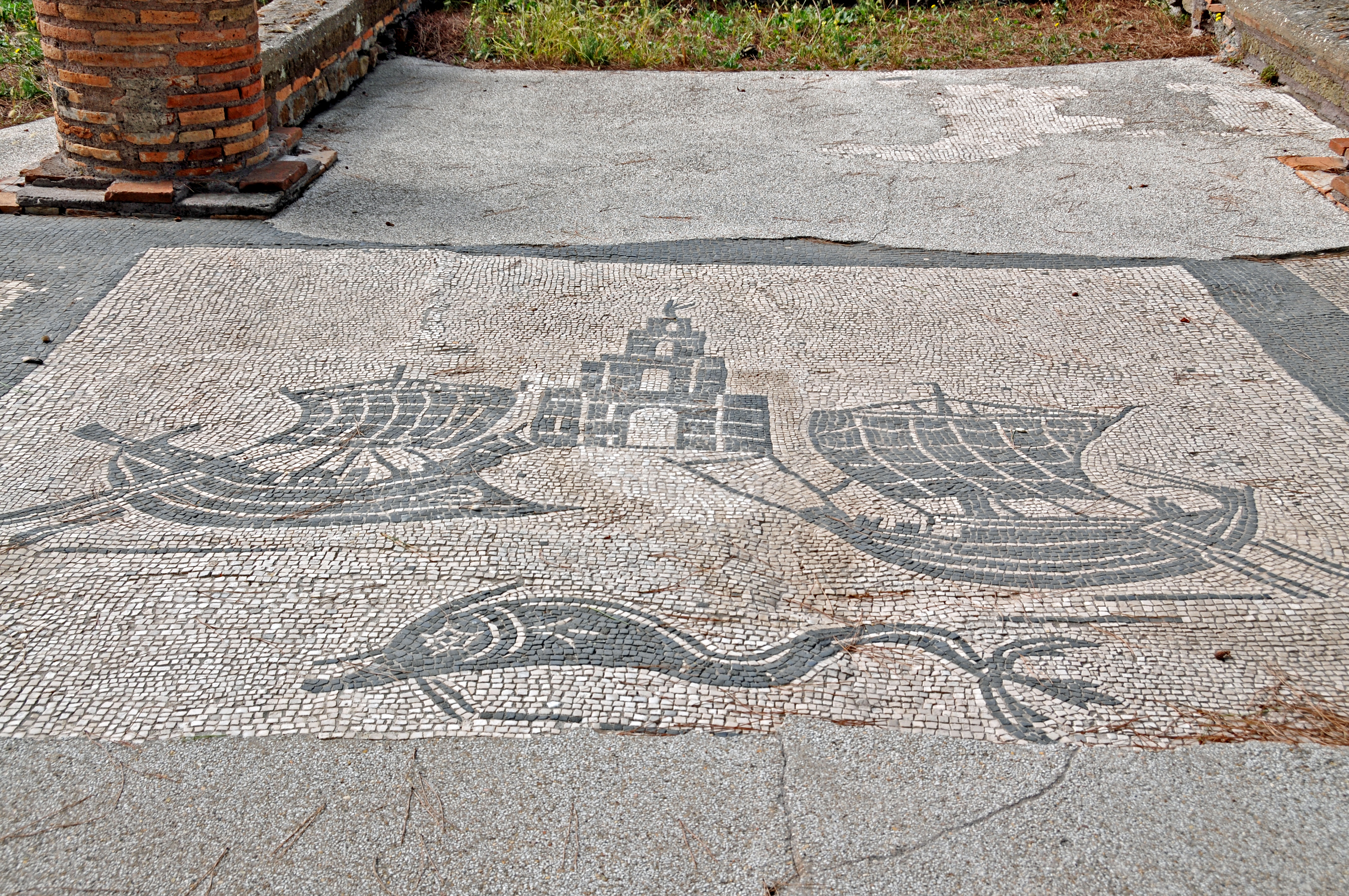
Lighthouse mosaic at Ostia

The foundation of this lighthouse was provided by filling one of the massive obelisk ships, used to transport an obelisk from Egypt to adorn the spina of the Circus of Caligula. The lighthouse was a famous landmark and probably built in imitation of the Pharos at Alexandria. It was depicted in many ancient sculptures, mosaics, coins etc. and its remains could still be seen in the 15th century.

The harbour opened directly to the sea on the northwest and communicated with the Tiber by a channel on the southeast. The goal was to obtain protection from the prevalent southwest wind, to which the river mouth was exposed. Though Claudius, in the inscription which he erected in 46, stated that he had freed the city of Rome from the danger of inundation, his work was only partially successful: in 62 Tacitus speaks of a number of grain ships sinking within the harbour during a violent storm. Nero gave the harbour the name of "Portus Augusti". A canal, later called the Fossa Traiana (today's Fiumicino canal), was built to connect the Harbour of Claudius with the Tiber, allowing barges to travel up towards Rome with cargo transferred from seafaring cargo ships.

It was probably Claudius who constructed the new direct road from Rome to Portus, the Via Portuensis, which was 24 km (15 mi) long. The Via Portuensis ran over the hills as far as the modern Ponte Galeria, and then straight across the plain. An older road, the Via Campana, ran along the foot of the hills, following the right bank of the Tiber. It passed the grove of the Arval Brothers at the sixth mile, to the Campus salinarum romanarum, the saltmarsh on the right bank from which it derived its name.

=== Trajanic phase ===
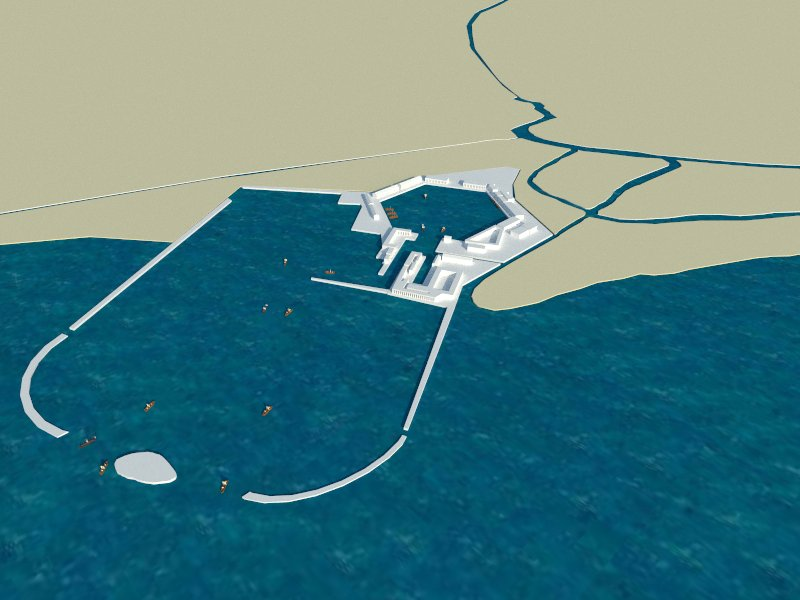
Portus: Claudius's first harbour and hexagonal basin extension under Trajan

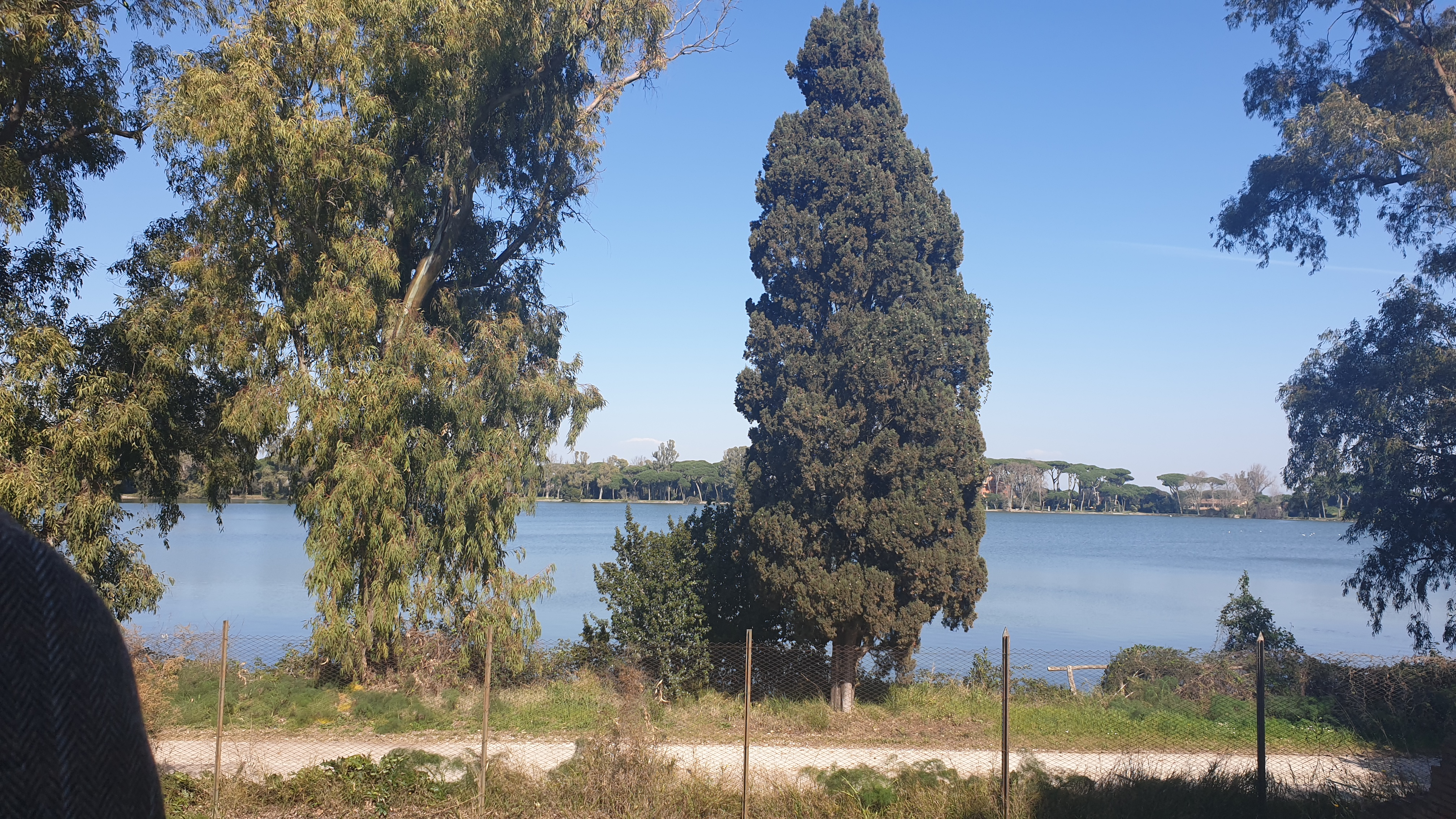
Hexagonal basin today

In 103, Trajan constructed another harbour farther inland: a hexagonal basin enclosing an area of 39 hectares (97 acres), 7 m deep and paved in stone. It included new warehouses, a temple of Liber Pater, the Imperial Palace complex also performing administrative functions and a shipyard.

The new harbour communicated by canals with the harbour of Claudius, with the Tiber directly and with the sea, the last now forming the navigable arm of the Tiber, reopened for traffic by Gregory XIII and again by Paul V. Another canal linked the port to Ostia running parallel to Via Flavia, the "Ostia-Portus" canal discovered in 2010.

The hexagonal basin itself is still preserved, and is still a lagoon. It was surrounded by extensive warehouses, remains of which may still be seen: the fineness of the brickwork of which they are built is remarkable.

Trajan's Warehouses, built behind the imposing colonnade of the Portico of Claudius, were the Roman Empire's largest storage complex covering more than 3.5 ha, and with an innovative plan organised around a central axis partially monumentalised by a double row of travertine columns in ashlar style, known as "Strada Colonnata". The warehouses had 400 cells of about 400 m^{3} volume each. Their walls' considerable thickness gave protection from abrupt temperature changes while damp was avoided by the lining of the walls in waterproof cocciopesto and the suspended floors.

The so-called Imperial Palace of 3 ha area had a distinctive trapezoidal plan with a large open area to the east and with monumental facades to the west and south overlooking the Claudian and Trajanic harbours. It dates from 112/117 in the reign of Trajan. Fresh water was used in great quantity for baths, fountains etc.

=== Effects on Ostia ===
Portus captured the main share of the harbour traffic of Rome, though the importance of Ostia did not immediately decrease.

The abandonment of Portus dates from the partial silting up of the right arm of the Tiber in the Middle Ages, which restored to Ostia what little traffic was left.

=== Medieval and modern town ===
Between 313 and 314 AD under Constantine, Portus achieved complete administrative autonomy and was given the name of civitas Flavia Costantiniana Portuensis. The construction of warehouses in the Antemurale area is attested during the 4th century while intense trading activity is documented until the mid-5th century. Towards 480 a circuit of defensive walls was built to protect the innermost part of the harbour from attacks by sea.

Portus was the main port on the Tyrrhenian Sea until the 6th century when the basin of Claudius had mostly silted up and the gradually abandoned warehouses became partially occupied by burials.

During the Gothic Wars (535-553) the port was the centre of violent clashes between the Ostrogoths and the Byzantines vying for control over it. Finally with the stable Byzantine presence, the Imperial Palace and the surrounding areas were demolished, and the city's administrative heart shifted to the zone around Basilica Portuense, which was used at least until the 13th century.

Ostia, just opposite on the left bank of the Tiber, was increasingly depopulated after Vandal and Saracen attacks. Ostia and Portus both were chosen to be amongst the seven suburbicarian dioceses, which are still in existence, and reserved for the members of the highest order of Catholic Cardinals, the Cardinal Bishops, so the prelates of these otherwise insignificant Roman suburbs outrank all archbishops, even the patriarchs.

== Current remains ==
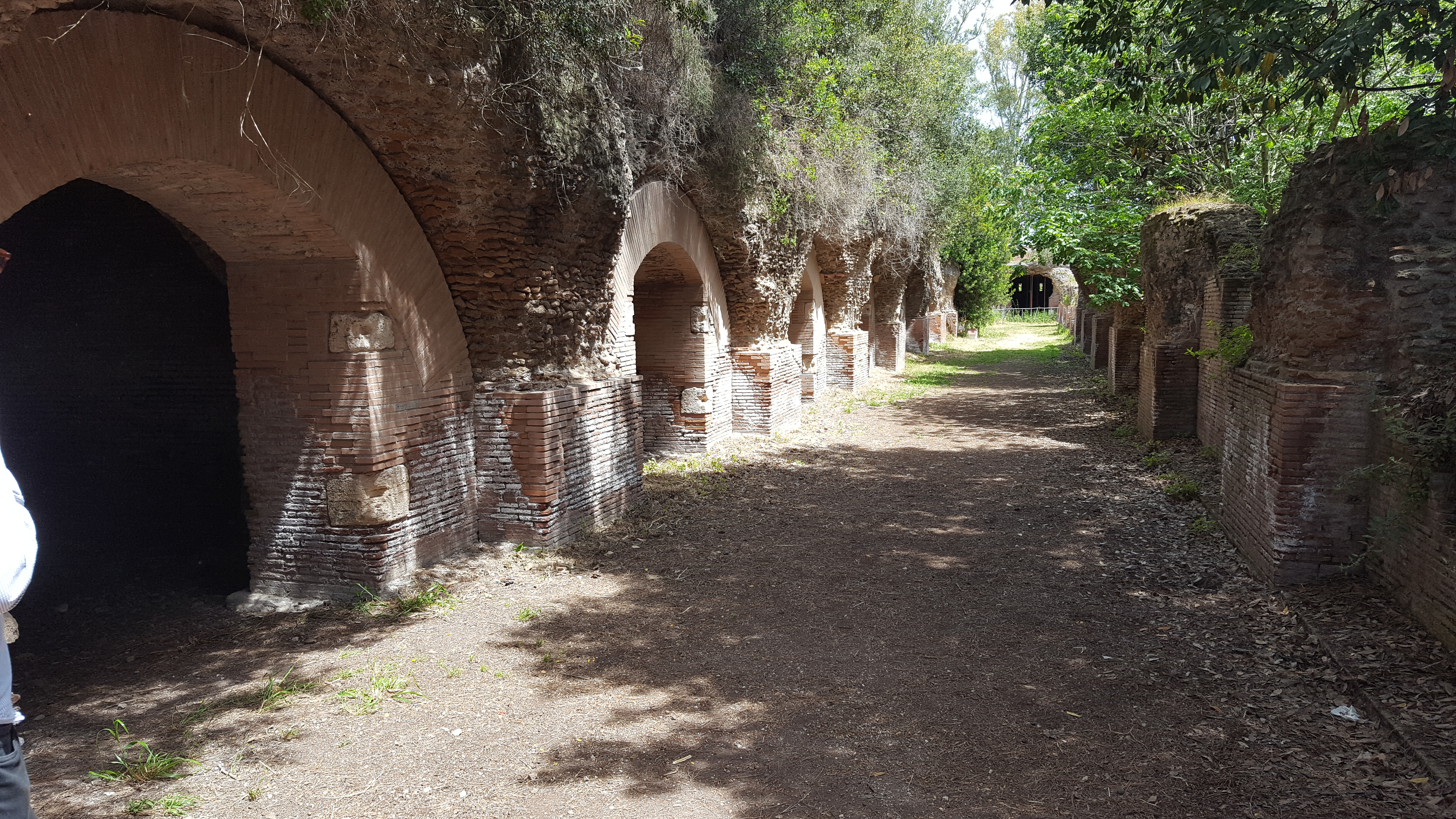
Severan warehouses

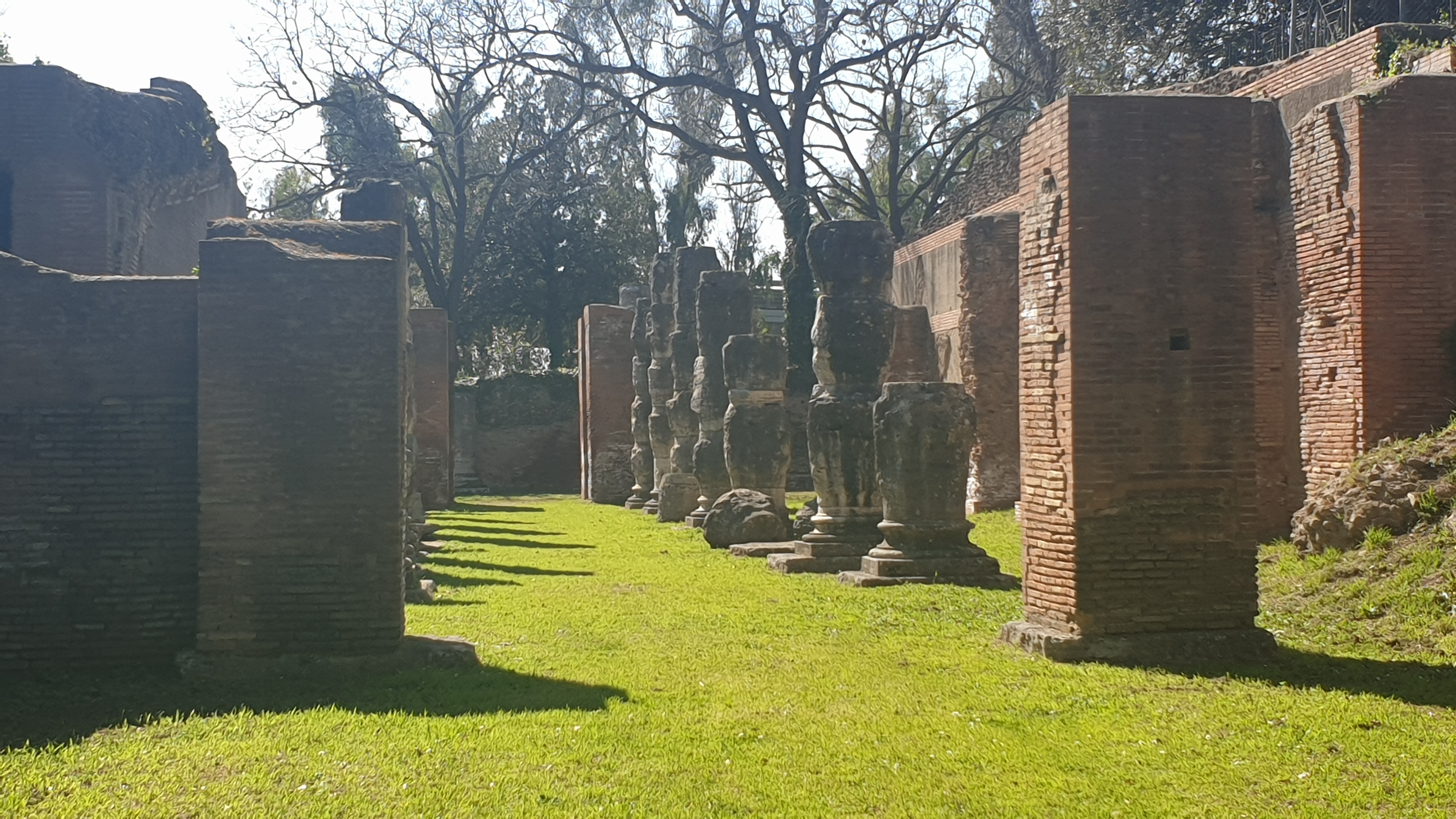
Portico of Claudius

Many parts of the vast site have been excavated and a large part is open to the public.

Some remains were easily traceable in the 16th century when Pirro Ligorio and Antonio Labacco made plans of the harbour. Considerable excavations were carried out in 1868, but with the idea of recovering works of art and antiquities. The plan and description given by Rodolfo Lanciani (Annali del institute, 1868, 144 sqq.) were made under unfavourable circumstances.

Excavations in 2007-2012 through the Portus Project focussed on the area between the hexagonal harbour and the Claudian basin, and particularly on and around the so-called Imperial Palace. Excavation is continuing especially in the Great Horrea of Septimius Severus.

A large part of the northern mole of the Claudian harbour has been excavated and is visible near the airport and the Ship Museum.

== Surrounding sites ==
Just across the canal from the entrance to Portus, excavations in 1975-77 brought to light baths from the late 2nd century AD, together with a sanctuary of the Egyptian deity Isis Pharia, protector of sailors. The sanctuary is known from inscriptions relating to the last restorations in 375-378, a few years before the suppression of pagan cults by Theodosius in 380. The temple was identified due to the discovery of a large statue now in the Ostiense Museum of a draped female figure with the serpent Agathodaimon ("benevolent genius").

To the west of the harbour is the 10th century cathedral of Saint Rufina, modernized except for the campanile, and the episcopal palace, fortified in the Middle Ages, and containing a number of ancient inscriptions from the site. On the ancient island of Isola Sacra nearby is the church of S. Ippolito built on the site of a Roman building, with a picturesque medieval campanile (13th century ?), as well as the Isola Sacra Necropolis.

== See also ==
- Fiumicino Roman Ships Museum https://www.adr.it/web/aeroporti-di-roma-en/ships-museum
- History of Rome
- Isola Sacra
- Roman navy
