= Isola Sacra =

Island in Italy

Coordinates: 41°45′N 12°15′E

- Necropoli di Porto
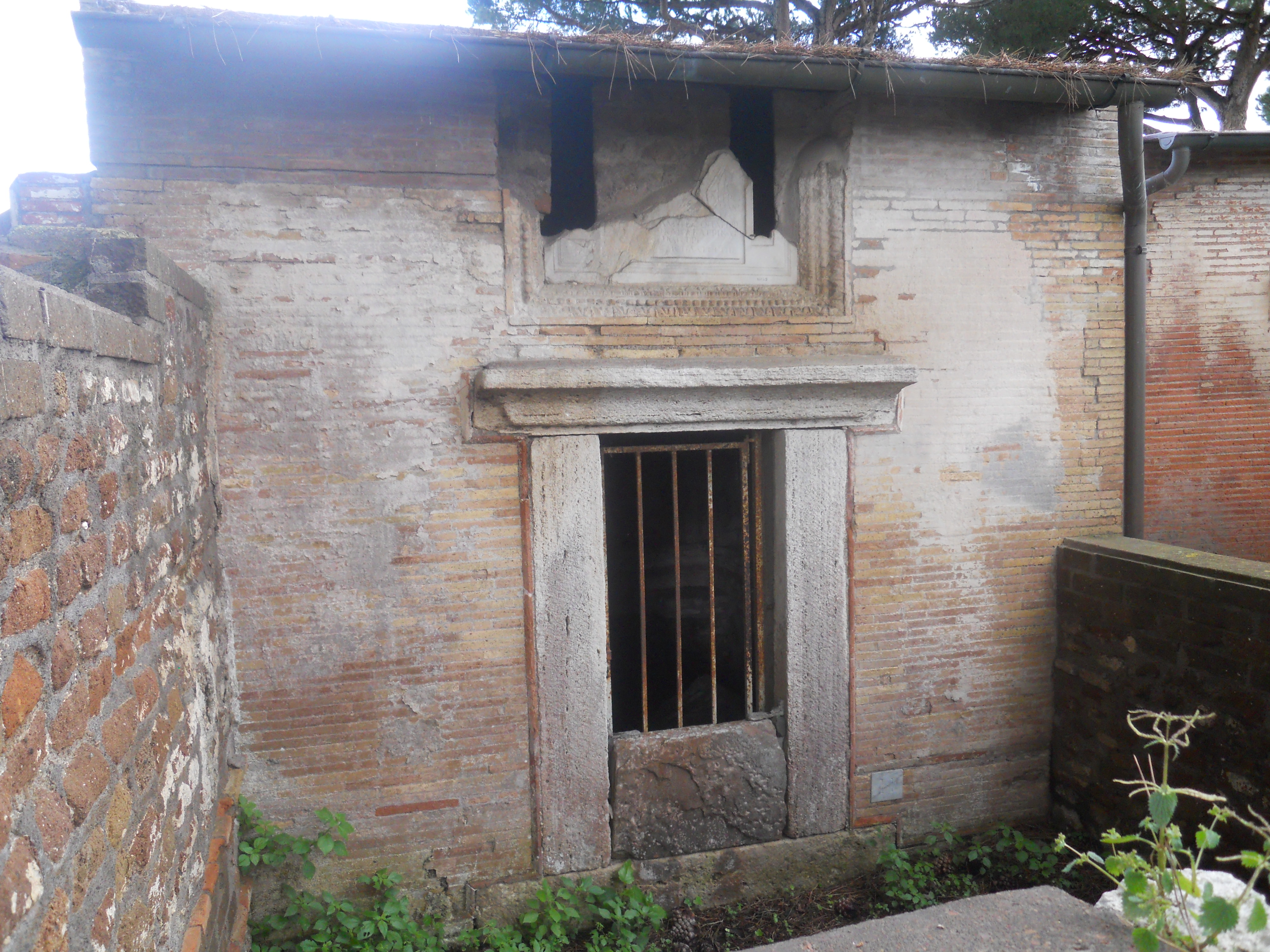
- Necropolis of Portus

- Location within Lazio
- Type: Necropolis
- Periods: Roman Republic - Roman Empire
- Cultures: Ancient Rome
- Location: Comune di Fiumicino, Lazio, Italy
- Region: Lazio

History
- Built: first century AD
- Abandoned: sixth century AD

Site notes
- Archaeologists: Guido Calza
- Management: Archaeological Park of Ostia Antica
- Public access: yes
- Website: ostiaantica.beniculturali.it

Isola Sacra (the Holy Isle) is situated in the Lazio region of Italy south of Rome, near the Tyrrhenian Sea. It is part of the town of Fiumicino.

== Overview ==
The area between Portus and Ostia Antica was transformed into an artificial island by Emperor Claudius, creating a canal that linked the Tiber to Portus (Fossa Traiana, now Fiumicino Canal). Merchant ships arriving from Egypt and Africa were able to reach Ostia using this canal. The island was originally much smaller but it has been constantly growing due to the alluvial activity of the Tiber. Its area has almost quintupled since antiquity. The inhabitants of Portus were middle-class administrators, traders, merchants, and sea workers often descended from slaves.

In the 1st century AD., a road linked the two ports, crossing through the island and becoming the main road axis. The Isola Sacra Necropolis grew up alongside the road, which was discovered between the 1920s and the 1940s, while the land was being reclaimed. Some of the necropolis buildings have two storeys, elaborately decorated with paintings, stucco work and mosaics.

The left side of the Fossa Traiana was a residential area of Portus. Near the Fiumicino Canal, by the bridge that crossed over to Portus, the so-called Terme di Matidia can be seen. The core of the complex built in the middle of the 2nd century and used until the 6th century. The Basilica of St. Hippolitus was built between the end of the 4th and the beginning of the 5th century. The building was divided into three naves by two rows of columns.

The study of human skeletal remains from the site continues to provide important information about diet and morbidity in ancient Rome.

== Sources ==
- D'Ambra, E. 1981. "A work 'ethic' at Ostia: the Isola Sacra reliefs." Thesis (M.A.)--University of California, Los Angeles—Art History.
- Keay, S., Millett, M., Strutt, K., Germoni, P. 2020. "The Isola Sacra Survey, Ostia, Portus and the port system of Imperial Rome", McDonald Institute for Archaeological Research, Cambridge, UK, (226 p).
- Prowse T., Schwarcz H., Saunders S., Bondioli L., and Macchiarelli R. 2005. "Isotopic evidence for age-related variation in diet from Isola Sacra, Italy." American Journal of Physical Anthropology. 128(1):2-13.
