= Archagathus (son of Lysanias) =

Archagathus (Ancient Greek: Ἀρχάγαθος), a Peloponnesian, the son of Lysanias, who settled at Rome as a practitioner of medicine around 219 BCE, and, according to Lucius Cassius Hemina, was the first person who made it a distinct profession in that city. He was received in the first instance with great respect, he was accorded the Jus Quiritium – that is, the privileges of a free native of Rome – and a shop was bought for him at the public expense; but his practice was observed to be so severe, that he soon excited the dislike of the people at large and produced a complete disgust to the profession generally. In return for the favors he received from the Romans, he purged, bled, hacked, and cauterized them to such a degree, that at length they refused to tolerate such rough treatment any longer, and the commonwealth was purged of Archagathus himself.

The practice of Archagathus seems to have been almost exclusively surgical, and to have consisted, in a great measure, in the use of the knife and powerful caustic applications.
