= Terracina =

- Comune
- Città di Terracina
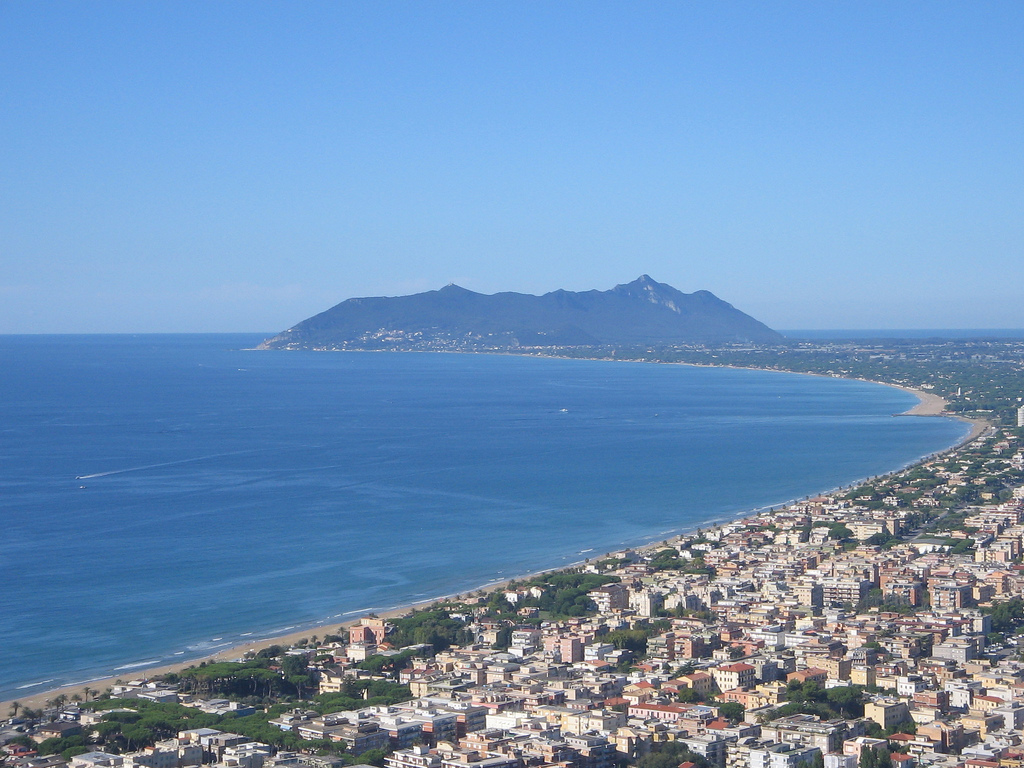
- Aerial view of Terracina with the Circeo promontory in the background

- Coat of arms

- Location within Italy Location within Lazio
- Coordinates: 41°17′N 13°15′E
- Country: Italy
- Region: Lazio
- Province: Latina (LT)

Area
  - Total: 136 km^{2} (53 sq mi)

Population (2016)
  - Total: 45,850
  - Density: 337/km^{2} (873/sq mi)
- Time zone: UTC+1 (CET)
  - Summer (DST): UTC+2 (CEST)
- ISTAT code: 059032
- Patron saint: Saint Caesarius of Terracina
- Saint day: First Sunday of November
- Website: Official website

Terracina is an Italian city and comune of the province of Latina, located on the coast 56 km (35 mi) southeast of Rome on the Via Appia (76 km (47 mi) by rail). The site has been continuously occupied since antiquity.

== History ==
=== Ancient times ===
Terracina appears in ancient sources with two names: the Latin Tarracina and the Volscian Anxur. The latter is the name of Jupiter himself as a youth (Iuppiter Anxur or Anxurus), and was the tutelary god of the city, venerated on the Mons Neptunius (current Monte S. Angelo), where a temple dedicated to him still exists (see below). The name Tarracina has been instead pointed out variously as pre-Indo-European origin (Ταρρακινή in ancient Greek), or as Etruscan (Tarchna or Tarchuna, the name of the Tarquinii family): in this view, it would precede the Volscian conquest.

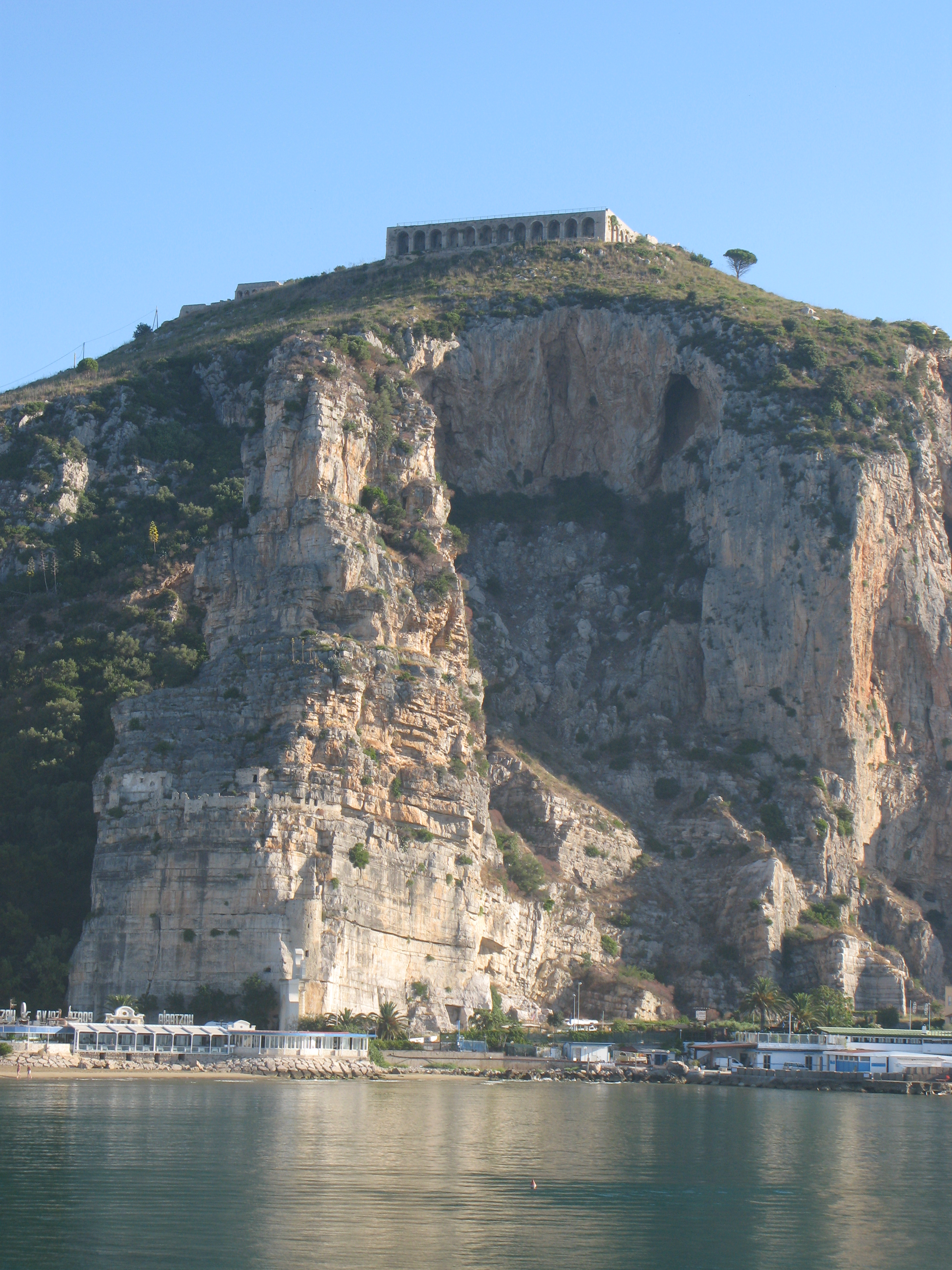
Platform of sanctuary and temple of "Jupiter Anxur"

Terracina occupied a position of notable strategic importance: it is located at the point where the Volscian Hills (an extension of the Lepini Mountains) reach the coast, leaving no space for passage between them and the sea, on a site commanding the Pontine Marshes (urbs prona in paludes, "a city surrounded by marshes", as Livy called it) and also possessing a small harbour. During the 600s BC, it joined the Etruscan League of twelve cities. In 509 BC Terracina was already under Roman supremacy as reported in the 1st treaty between Rome and Carthage. It was soon re-occupied by the Volsci and was not included in the list of the Latin League of 499 BC. In 406 it was recaptured by the Romans then lost in 402 and recovered in 400, unsuccessfully attacked by the Volsci in 397, and finally secured by the establishment of a colony of Roman citizens in 329 BC as Colonia Anxurnas.

==== The Roman City ====
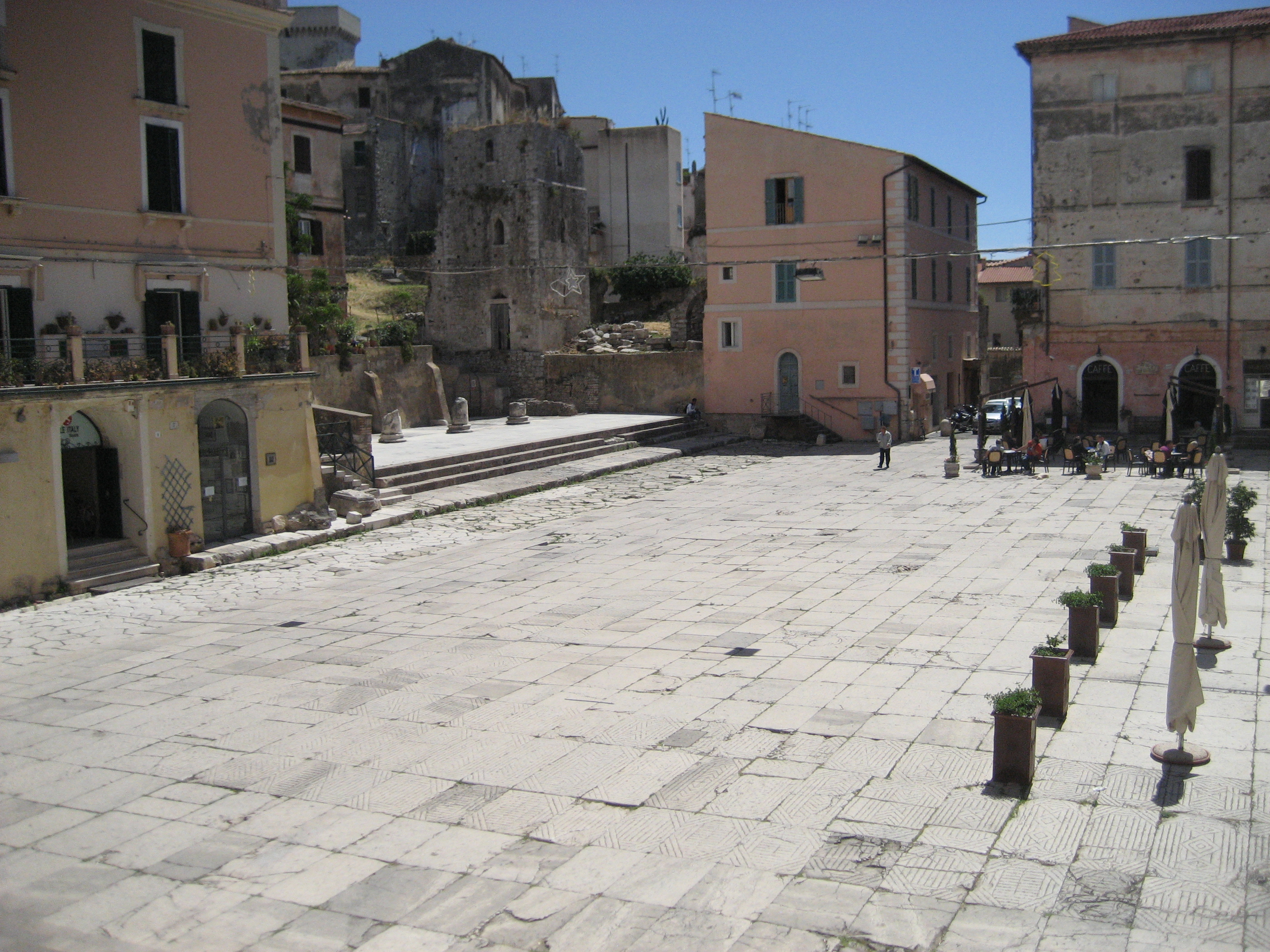
Roman Forum Aemilianum and Via Appia

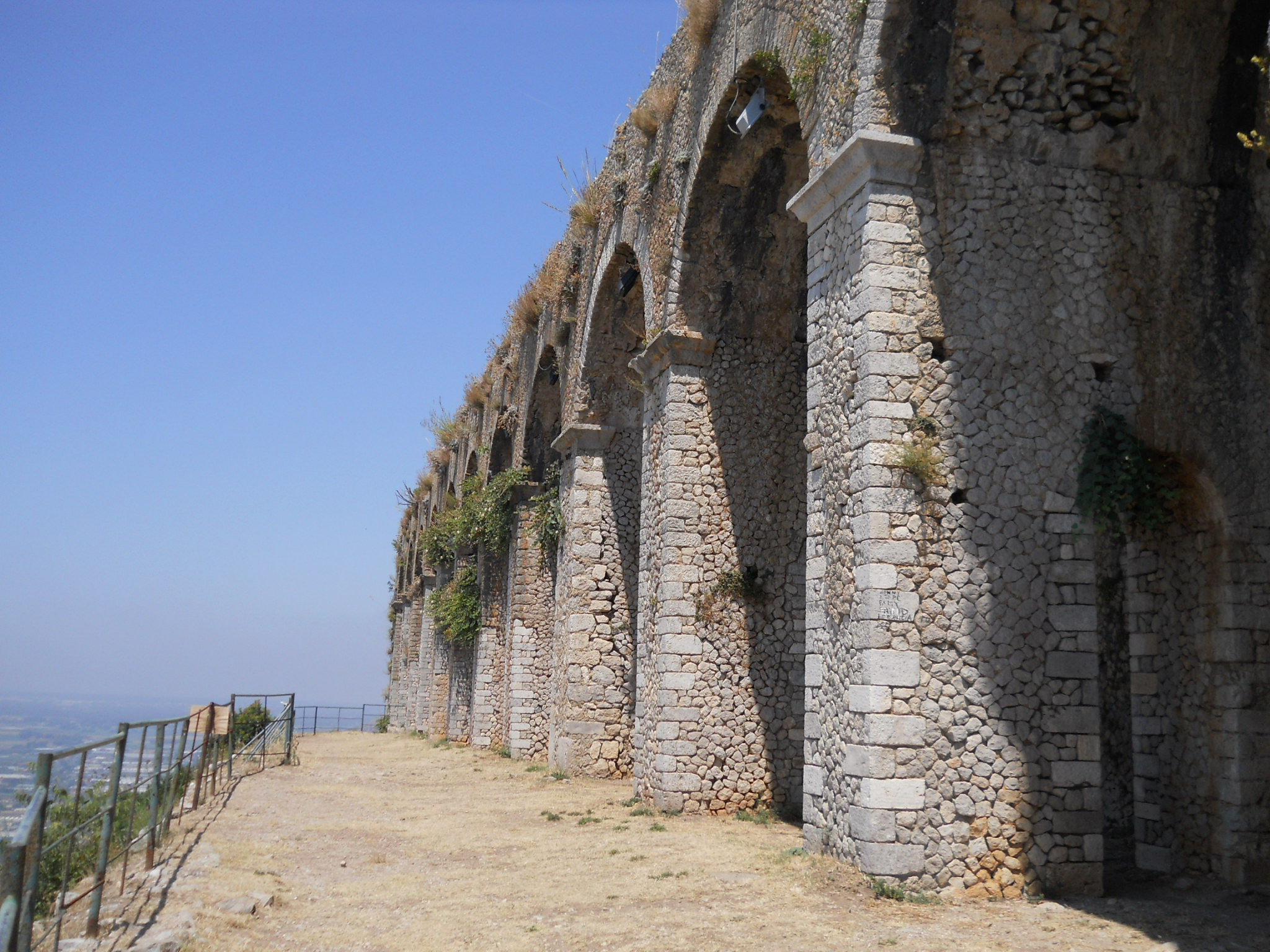
Cryptoporticus of the Sanctuary

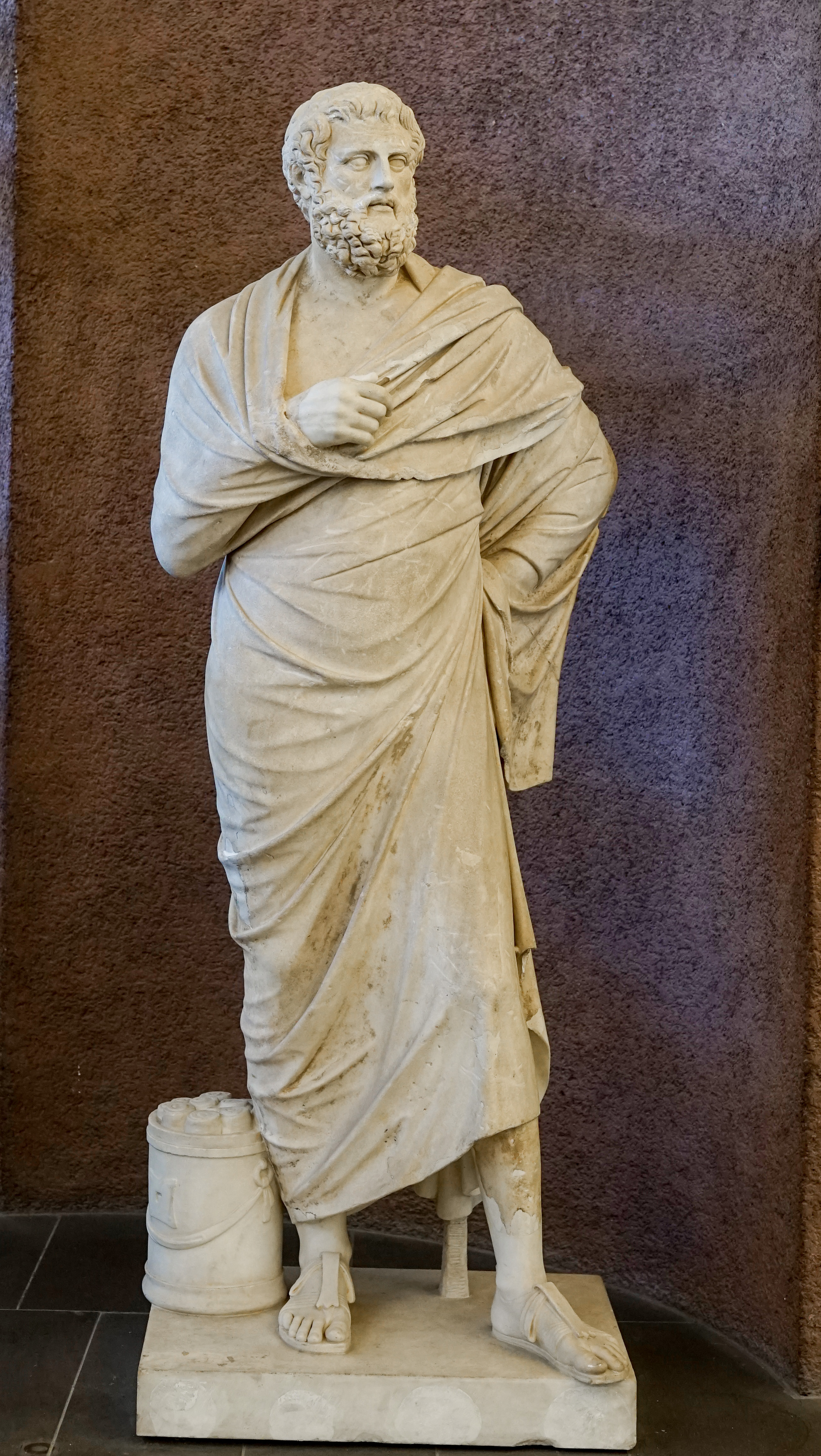
Sophocles from Terracina (Vatican museums)

As a colonia maritima the town frequently appears in history. The construction of the Via Appia in 312 BC added to its importance: the road at first crossed the hill at the back of the promontory by a steep ascent and descent. An attempt was made in 184 BC to get round it (by censor Lucius Valerius Flaccus) on an embankment thrown out into the sea: but it was probably not until early in Trajan's time (98-117 AD) that a cut in the rocks at the foot of the promontory (Pisco Montano) finally solved the problem. The depth of the cut is indicated by marks on the vertical wall at intervals of 10 Roman feet; the lowest mark, about 1 m above the present road, is CXX, corresponding to 36 metres (118 feet).

It was probably in consequence of this road cut that some of the more important buildings of the imperial period were erected on the low ground near the small harbour. The construction of the coast road, the Via Severiana, from Ostia to Terracina, added to the importance of the place. The Via Appia and the Via Severiana met some few miles east of Terracina, and the Via Appia then traversed the pass of Lautulae, between the mountains and the Lake of Fondi, where the Samnites defeated the Romans with losses in 315 BC. The natural environment and scenery of the promontory, with its luxuriant flora and views, had caused it to be frequented by the Romans as early as 200 BC.

Terracina became an important centre for the development of the fertile valley lying to the west, and started to grow new settlements at the foot of the hill which turned into a sanctuary area with some patrician mansions.

New public edifices were erected starting from the time of Sulla including a new theatre and forum, while the sanctuary was renovated. Marcus Favonius, the imitator of Cato the Younger, was born in Terracina, as was the emperor Galba (in 3 BC); both Galba and Domitian possessed villas in the area.

The port was built under Trajan and Antoninus Pius in the 2nd century AD. The last Roman construction was that of a new line of walls during the 5th century AD.

The nearby mineral springs by the coast, known to the Romans as Neptuniae aquae and later renamed Acqua Magnesia, are still in use, except one containing arsenic which was blocked up both by the ancients and again in 1839 as a precaution.

=== Middle Ages ===
Terracina is mentioned in the history of the Gothic War, and Theodoric is said to have had a palace here. It was sacked in 409 and 595. After the Lombards had conquered part of Italy in the late 6th century, Terracina remained an important military stronghold of the Byzantine Empire, and later became part of the Duchy of Naples. It was one of the northernmost outposts of Byzantine authority in the south. A monument bearing the name of Duke George of Naples stood there at the turn of the 20th century.

In 872, Pope John VIII brought it under the domination of the Holy See. However, after the crisis of papal authority in the following century, Terracina came to be ruled by local or Roman families (like that of Crescenzi, who built a massive castle, or the Frangipani, who occupied it from 1153 to 1202). In 1088 it was the seat of the first conclave held outside Rome. In the 11th and 12th centuries Terracina had a notable spurt of growth, and two new suburbs were built next to the two walled gates of Porta Maggio ("Cipollata"), Porta Albina, Porta St. Gregory and Porta Romana. A free commune was also instituted. In 1217 Pope Honorius III united its diocese to those of Sezze and Priverno.

The 1357 Costituzioni Egiziane ("Egyptian Constitutions") marked the beginning of a stronger papal authority, which however did not impede the growth of the king of Naples's influence, nor did it stop the city's internal struggles.

=== Modern era ===
The 16th century saw the communal freedoms steadily eroded, due both to the general decline of Terracina (aggravated by malaria in the increasingly marshy surrounding land) and the devastating attacks by pirates coming from North Africa. A malaria plague in 1520 contributed to this process. However, in this period the first Renaissance mansions began to be built by noble families like the Savio, Garzoni, Gottifredi, de' Romanis and others.

In the 17th century the popes began a program of repopulation of Terracina through the resettlement of families from the country nearby lured by tax exemptions. In this period the churches of St. John (formerly St. Lawrence) and Madonna delle Grazie were both rebuilt. In the two following centuries Terracina assumed its current appearance. Pope Pius VI started a program of draining the marshes and added a new quarter next to the channel-port.

During the Napoleonic occupation Terracina was at first annexed to the Circeo département, but revolted in 1798: the riot was suppressed by French and Polish troops, led by general Étienne-Jacques-Joseph-Alexandre MacDonald. After the end of the Napoleonic Wars, the position of Terracina at the border between the Papal States and the Kingdom of Naples was officially set by the Concordat signed by Pope Pius VII and Ferdinand I of Two Sicilies in 1818.

View from Terracina towards Mount Circeo in a painting by Giovanni Costa (1896)

In 1839 and 1843 Gregory XVI visited the city, in which he instituted works for a new port.

In 1934 the city was removed from the province of Rome and added to that of Latina.

After the end of World War II, in which it suffered heavy damage, Terracina developed greatly, with a large new quarter developing towards the Via Appia and alongside the coast north to Monte S. Angelo. This is Borgo Marino, the "Marine Quarter".

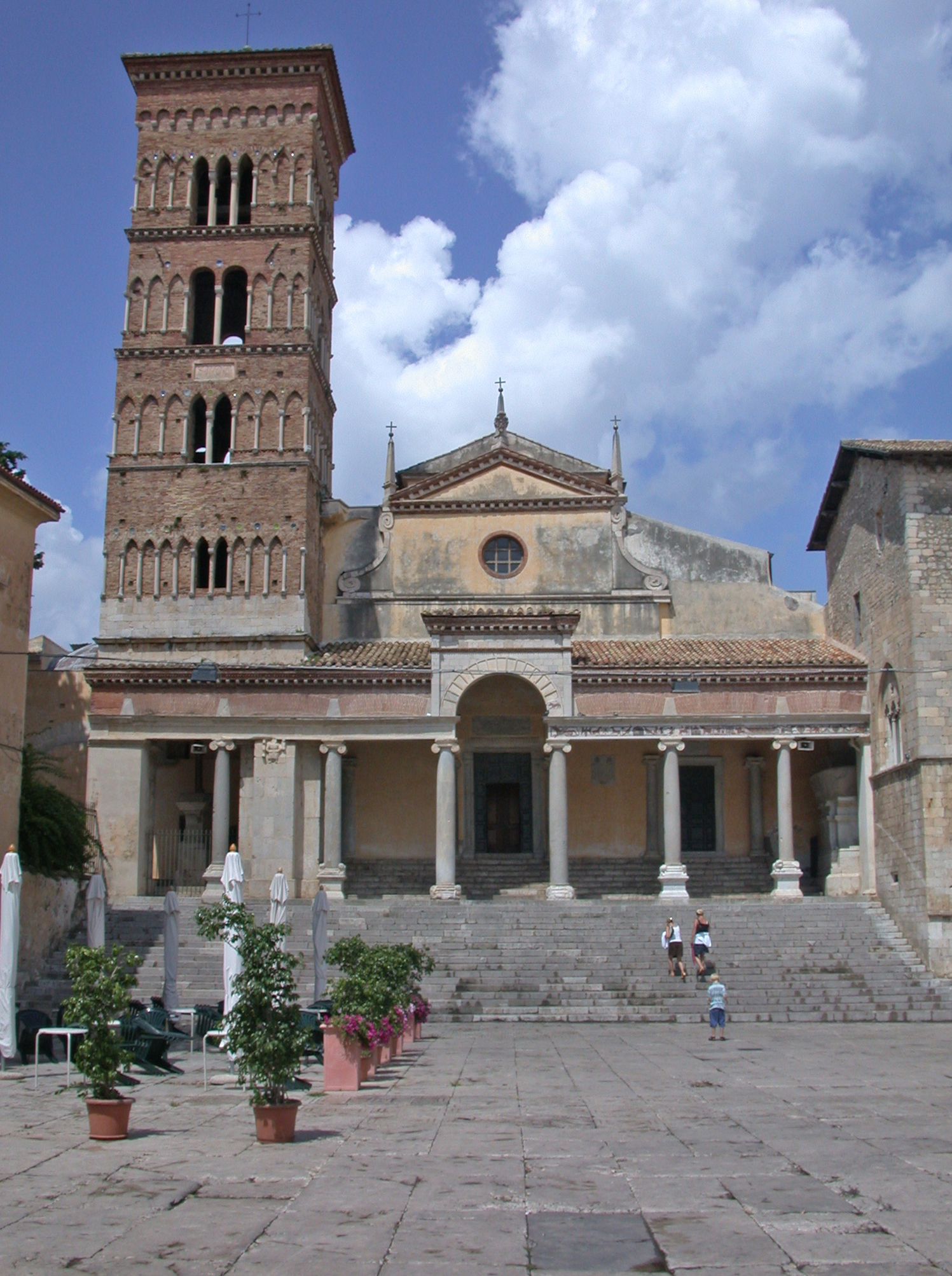
The Cathedral

The modern Palazzo Comunale (Town Hall) of Terracina

== Geography ==
The municipality borders with Fondi, Monte San Biagio, Pontinia, Sabaudia, San Felice Circeo and Sonnino. It counts the hamlets (frazioni) of Borgo Hermada, Frasso (shared with Sonnino), La Fiora and San Vito.

== Main sights ==
The modern town occupies the site of the old one. The present piazza is the ancient Roman forum, and the Roman pavement of slabs of travertine with the inscription A. AEMILIUS A. F. in letters once filled in with bronze, is well preserved. The paving is supported by massive arched substructures, which extend under the surrounding houses.

=== Medieval buildings ===
Terracina Cathedral (Cattedrale dei SS. Pietro e Cesareo) (Duomo) is ensconced within a temple of Roma and Augustus, part of the side wall of which, with engaged columns, is still visible. The edifice was consecrated in 1074, and renovated in the 12th and 18th centuries. The Cosmatesque-inlaid vestibule is preceded by an eighteen-step staircase, and supported by ten ancient columns resting upon recumbent lions, with a mosaic frieze upon them, made by 12th century Sicilian-Norman artists. The brick campanile, in Gothic-Romanesque-style, has small columns with little pointed arches and Islamic majolica in the walls. The interior has a Cosmatesque pulpit supported by ancient columns resting on lions, a Paschal candlestick of 1245, and a pavement of the same period with beasts and dragons.

To the right of the Duomo is the Gothic Palazzo Venditti, from the first half of the 14th century. Nearby is also the Torre Frumentaria ("Wheat Tower", 13th century), which now houses the Museo Pio Capponi.

The town walls consist of Byzantine and medieval towers erected along the Volscian and Roman curtain wall, in "polygonal" style similar to those of Constantinople. Beyond a three-way crossing, next to Porta Nuova, is the Frangipane Castle or Rocca Traversa, which in 1202 became the symbol of the communal freedom of Terracina. It was damaged by Allied bombs on September 4, 1943.

Other churches are those of the Annunziata (13th century, with a decorated architrave over the portal by a Master Andrew of Priverno), San Domenico (erected in the first decades of the 13th century, and enlarged in 1298) and San Francesco (1222), which follows the Gothic Cistercian style of the Abbey of Fossanova.

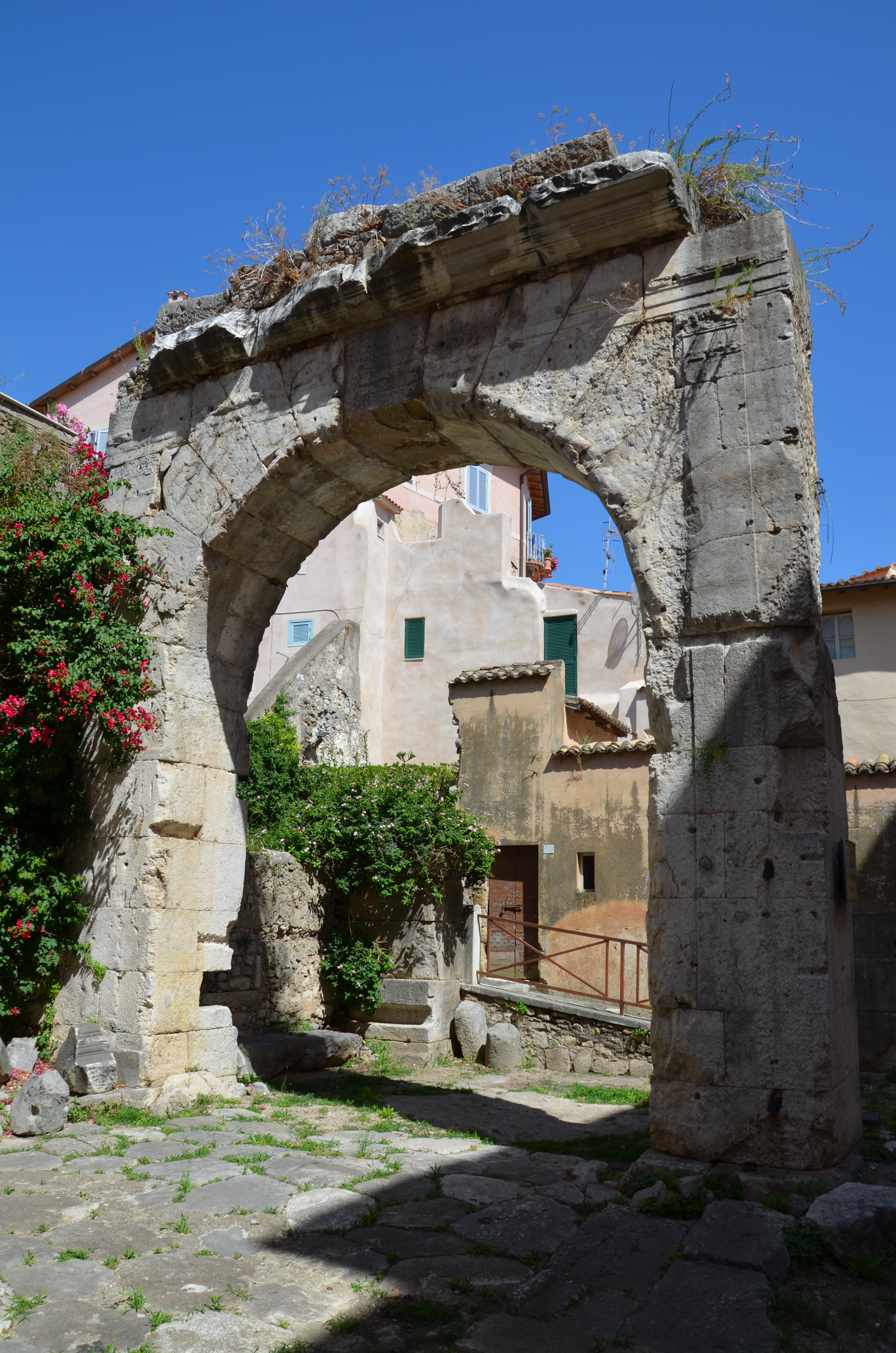
Remaining side of the four-sided arch with the ancient Via Appia

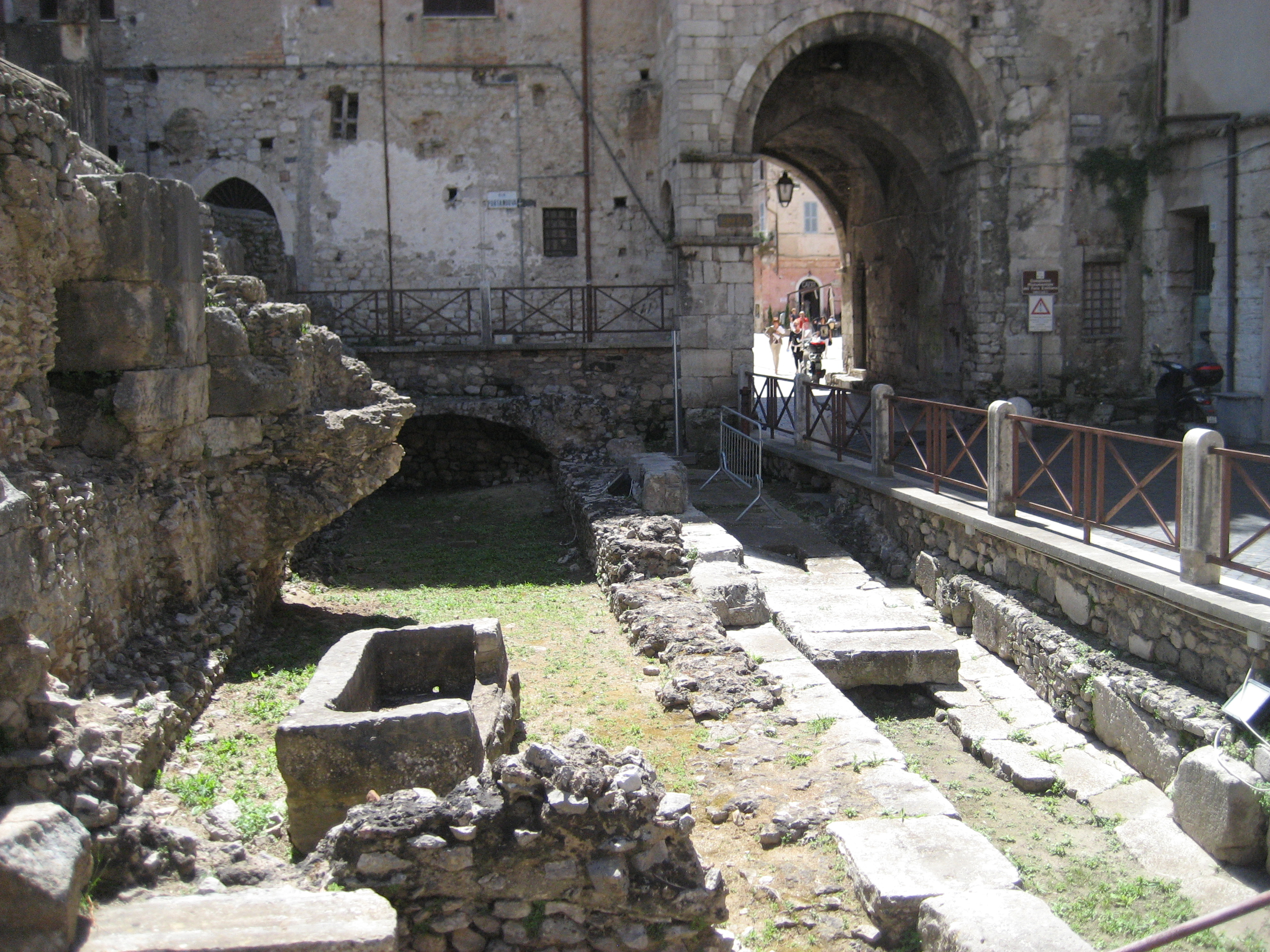
Front of the Capitol

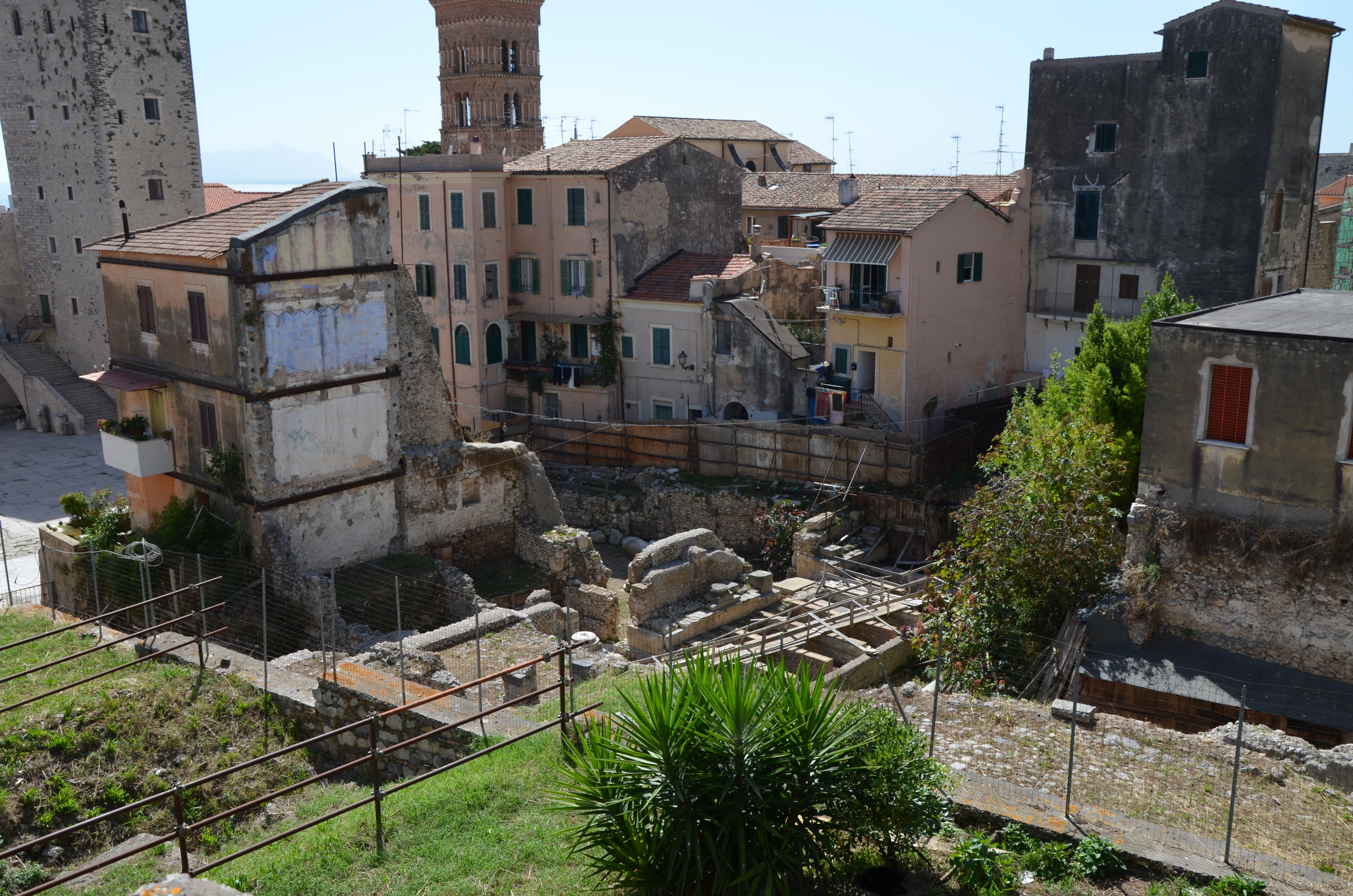
The Roman Theatre, 1st century BC

=== Roman remains ===
Many Roman ruins were brought to light only after the World War II bombings. These include a quadrifrons arch, which served as entrance to the forum. Two sides can be still seen in good condition, 6.4 by 6.34 metres (21.0 by 20.8 ft) wide. Under it is a well-preserved stretch of the ancient Via Appia.

Above the town are several massive terrace platforms for supporting buildings; these may well belong to the Roman period, and the latter even to the Empire. The summit of the promontory, elevation 227 metres (745 ft), is reached by the old line of the Via Appia, which is flanked by tombs and by remains of an ancient defensive wall with circular towers, the so-called Cinta Sillana (once attributed to Theodoric, but dating from the first decades of the 1st century BC). The summit is occupied by a large terrace, supported by arcades of fine opus incertum (traditionally, but wrongly, called the "palace of Theodoric") on all sides except the east, with views seaward over the coast and over the Pontine Marshes.

On the terrace stood the Corinthian-order temple traditionally attributed to Jupiter Anxur (1st century BC), about 35 by 20 metres (115 by 66 ft). The cella was decorated internally with engaged half-columns, and contained the pedestal for the statue of the Jupiter, who would have been venerated here as a child-god: this attribution is confirmed by the discovery of numerous leaden votive figures, like those later made for dolls' houses, in the favissae on the east of the temple. The interior cell measures 13 by 14 metres (43 by 46 ft) with 6 half-columns per side. However, recently the attribution of the temple to Jupiter has been put under discussion, due to the discovery of inscriptions dedicated to Venus.

At the external of the temple is the "oracle", a kind of quadrilateral base with a hole from which, standing in a cave, the priests communicated the answers to the questions of the faithful. To the left of this great construction is the Small Temple, probably a civil edifice to be dated somewhat earlier than the former one.

The remains of another temple, the Capitolium, 16.5 by 16 metres (54 by 52 ft), with cells 9.5 by 4.5 metres (31 by 15 ft), lie on the street starting from Palazzo Venditti. Built in the mid-1st century BC, it was dedicated to the Capitoline Triad of Jupiter, Juno and Minerva.

Of the lower town by the harbour, which had buildings of some importance of the imperial period (amphitheatre, baths, etc.), little is now visible, and its site is mainly occupied by a new quarter built by Pope Pius VI. Of the ancient harbour constructed by Antoninus Pius insignificant remains exist, and it is largely silted up. Close to it is the small modern port. In 1838, a marble bust of Sophocles was found near the amphitheatre. It is now in the Lateran Museum, Rome.

The commune of Terracina includes a considerable extent of territory towards the northwest with much undergrowth (macchia) valuable for charcoal burning, and a considerable extent of pasture and arable land. The ancient aqueduct, bringing water some 55 kilometres (34 mi) from the slopes of the Volscian Hills, has been repaired and is in use. About 5 kilometres (3 mi) to the northwest, at the foot of Monte Leano, was the shrine of the nymph Feronia, where the canal following the Via Appia through the marshes ended. Along these three km of the Via Appia are numerous ancient tombs, and the fertile valley to the northeast was thickly populated in Roman days, before the intrusion of malaria.

== Transport ==
The Terracina railway station is not on the main Rome-Naples railway line. The nearest stops are the station of Priverno-Fossanova or that of Monte San Biagio-Terracina Mare: the former has a shuttle rail connection to Terracina, which is discontinued since September 20, 2012 due to a landslide by which the rail was damaged.

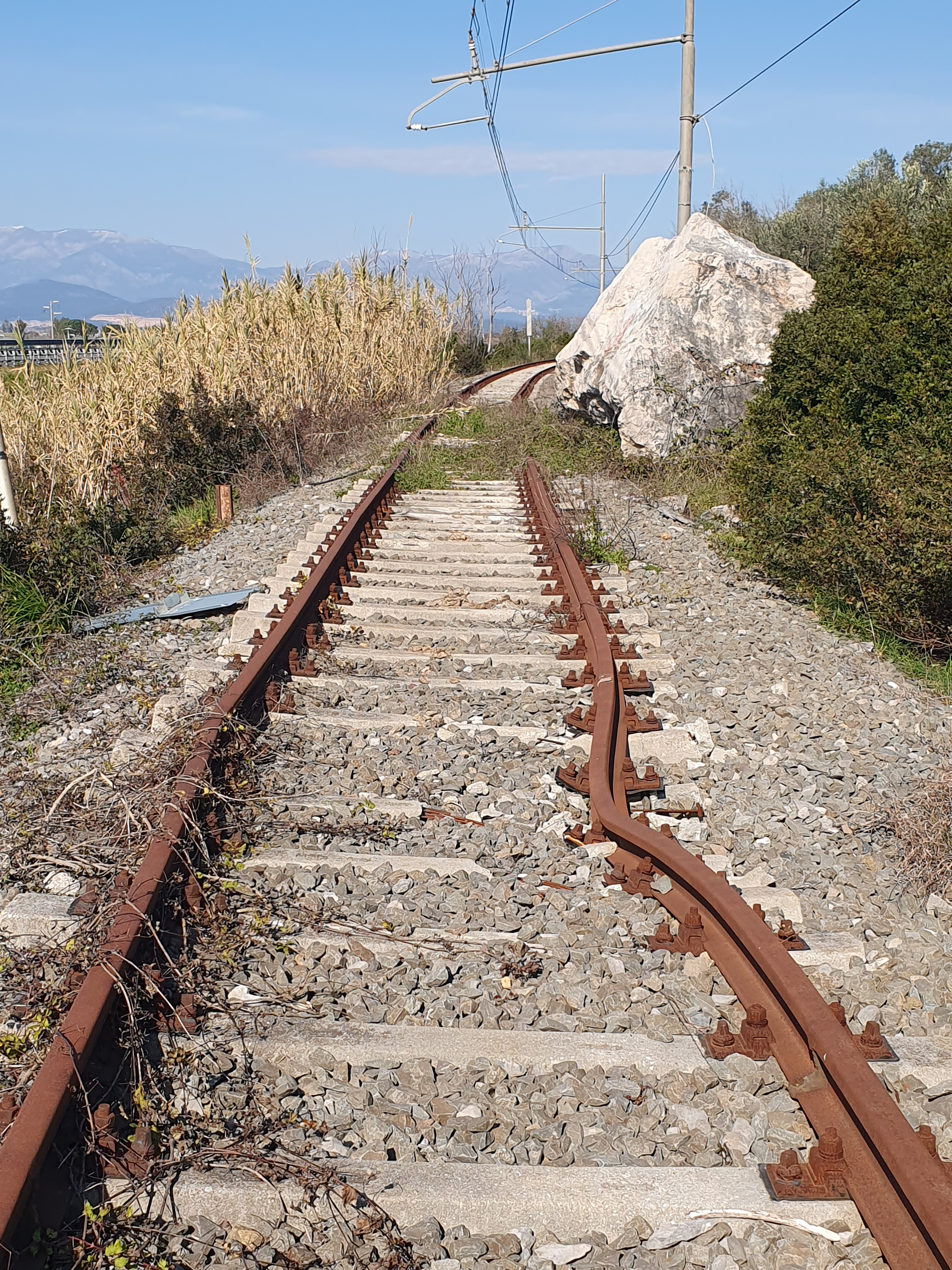
The boulder and damaged line

Terracina can be reached by car from Rome by the old Via Appia, or by the more modern Via Pontina. The Via Flacca connects the city to Sperlonga and Gaeta to the south coast. A fast road link leads to the Frosinone exit of the A1 Milan-Rome-Naples motorway.

Ferries connect Terracina to Ponza.

== Twin towns – sister cities ==
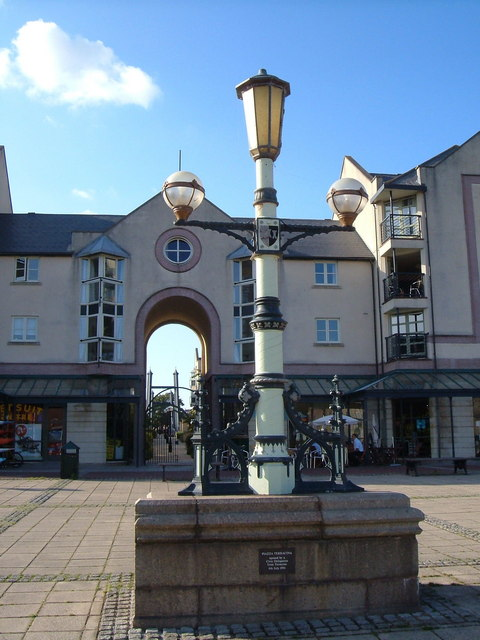
Piazza Terracina, Exeter, UK, named after Terracina

Terracina is twinned with:

- Bad Homburg vor der Höhe, Germany
- Cabourg, France
- Chur, Switzerland
- Exeter, Devon, United Kingdom
- Jūrmala, Latvia
- Mayrhofen, Austria
- Mondorf-les-Bains, Luxembourg
- Pécs, Hungary

== Notable people ==
- Marcus Favonius (c. 90 BC–42 BC), Roman politician
- Galba (3 BC- 69), Roman emperor
