= Guido Calza =

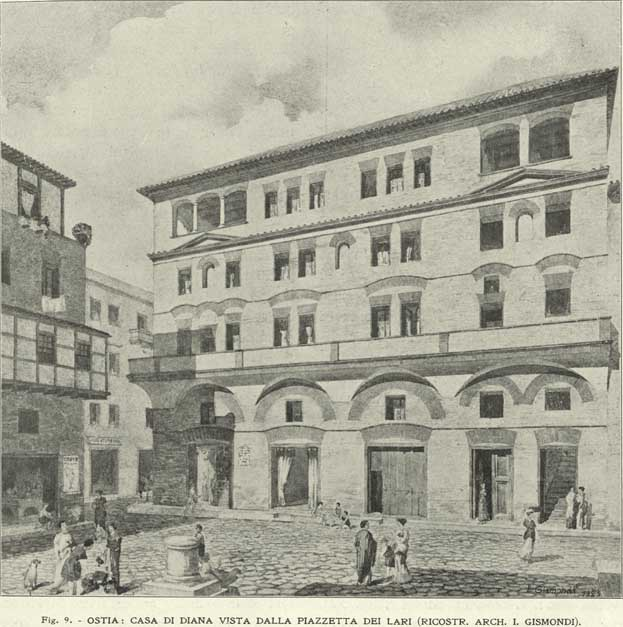
Insula reconstrustion. Casa di Diana by Italo Gismondi

Guido Calza (21 April 1888 – 17 April 1946 in Rome, Italy), born in Milan, Italy, was an Italian archaeologist whose work included excavations in Rome and at the port city of Ostia. Calza served as inspector of the Ostia excavations and as the director of excavations in the Forum Romanum and the Palatine Hill in Rome. He also oversaw the excavation of the Isola Sacra Necropolis.

Calza was the son of Arturo Calza.

== Necrology ==
- "Dr. Guido Calza, archaeologist, 58; Excavator of Ostia, the Port of Rome, Dies -- Found Earliest Known Christian Church", New York Times Apr 24, 1946, p. 25.
- Obituary by Herbert Bloch "In Memoriam Guido Calza (1888-1946)." American Journal of Archaeology 50 (1946), 407–408.
