= List of necropolises =

This is a list of necropolises sorted by country. Although the name is sometimes also used for some modern cemeteries, this list includes only ancient necropoleis, generally founded no later than approximately 1500 AD. Because almost every city in the ancient world had a necropolis, this list does not aim to be complete. It only lists the most notable necropoleis.

== List of necropolises by country ==
=== Algeria ===
Nepasa necropolis in Algeria

- Jedars
- Nepasa
- Roknia

=== Austria ===
- Burgstallkogel

=== Bosnia and Herzegovina ===
- Radimlja
- Mramorje

=== Brazil ===
- Cemitério de São Francisco Xavier

=== Bulgaria ===
- Varna Necropolis

=== China ===
- Ming Dynasty Tombs
- Western Xia tombs
- Eastern Qing Tombs
- Western Qing Tombs

=== Colombia ===
- San Agustin Archaeological Park

=== Cyprus ===
- Tombs of the Kings

=== Egypt ===
- Abusir
- Bagawat
- Dahshur
- Giza Necropolis
- Qubbet el-Hawa
- Saqqara
- Siwa Oasis
- Theban Necropolis
- Umm el-Qa'ab
- Minya

=== France ===
- Alyscamps
- Civaux
- Père Lachaise Cemetery
- Necropolis of Bougon
- Pantheon

=== Germany ===
- Necropolis of Soderstorf
- Oldendorfer Totenstatt

=== Greece ===
- Kerameikos
- Mycenae
- Vergina
- Amphipolis
- Marathon

=== Guatemala ===
- North Acropolis, Tikal

=== India ===
- Qutb Shahi tombs
- Barid Shahi tombs

=== Iran ===
- Naqsh-e Rustam
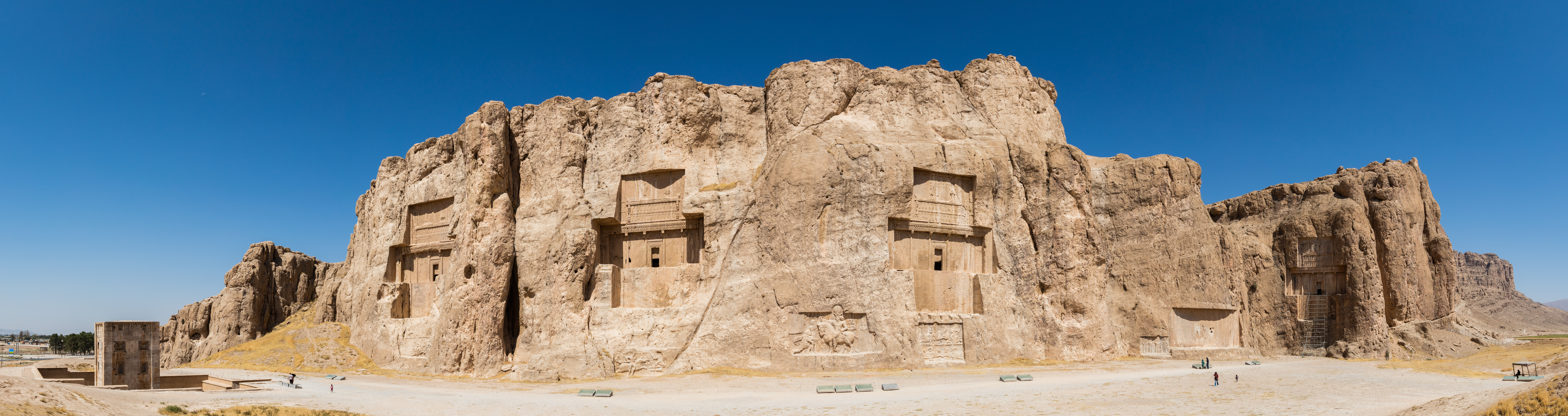
Naqsh-e Rustam in Iran

=== Iraq ===
- Wadi-us-Salaam, reputedly the largest cemetery in the world.
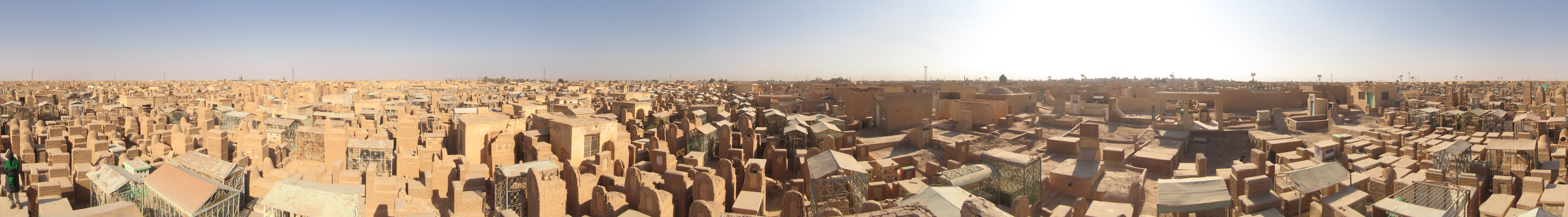
Panorama of Wadi-us-Salaam in Iraq

=== Israel ===
- Beit She'arim
- Mount of Olives

=== Italy ===
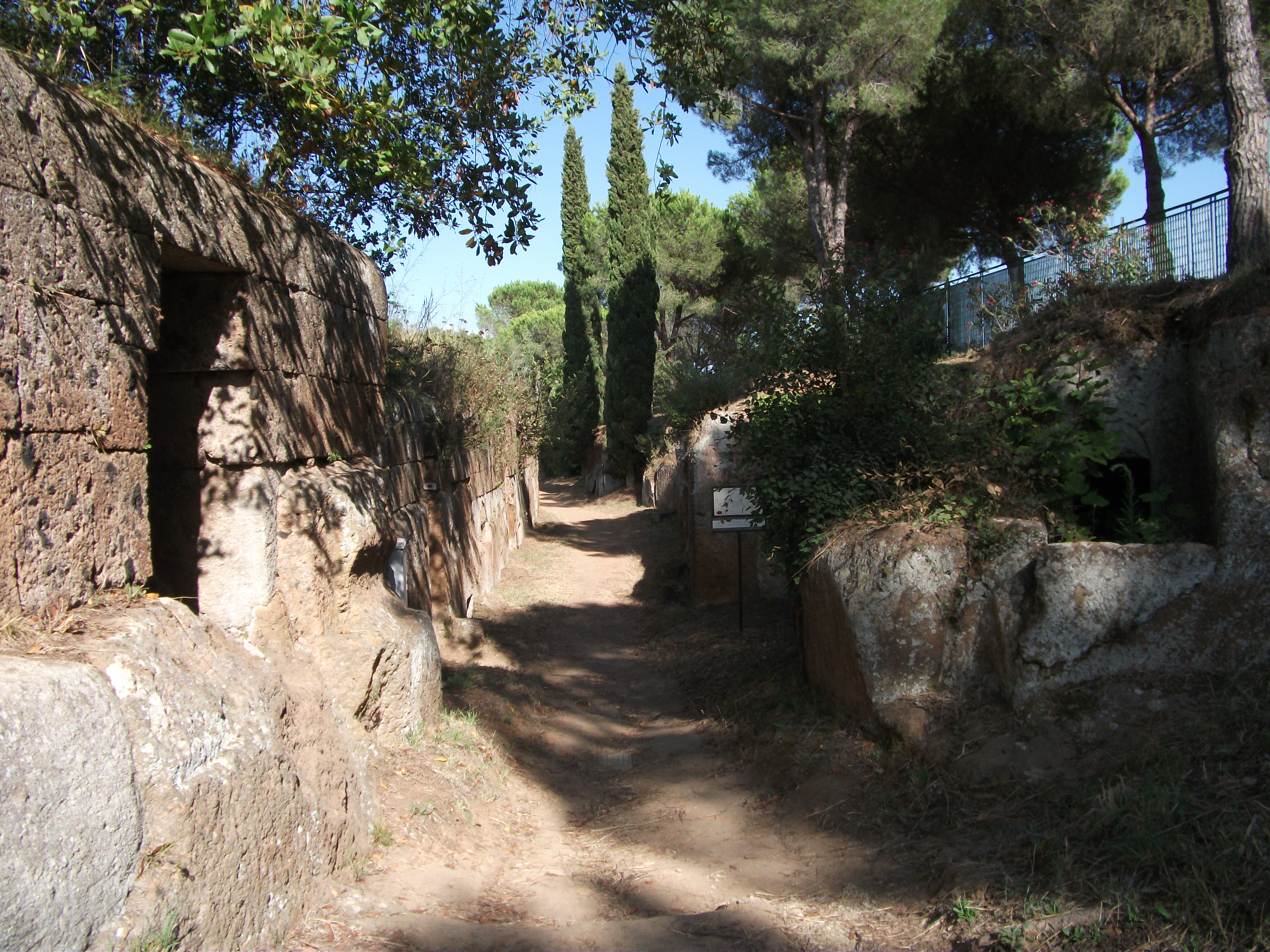
View of the Etruscan necropolis of Banditaccia in Cerveteri, Italy

- Cerveteri
- Gaudo culture necropolis
- Marzabotto
- Necropolis of Monte Luna
- Necropolis of Monterozzi
- Necropolis of Pantalica
- Norchia
- Tuvixeddu necropolis

=== Lebanon ===
View of the Tyre Necropolis in Lebanon

- Royal necropolis of Byblos
- Tyre Necropolis

=== Libya ===
- Necropolis of Cyrene

=== Malta ===
- Hypogeum of Ħal-Saflieni

=== Morocco ===
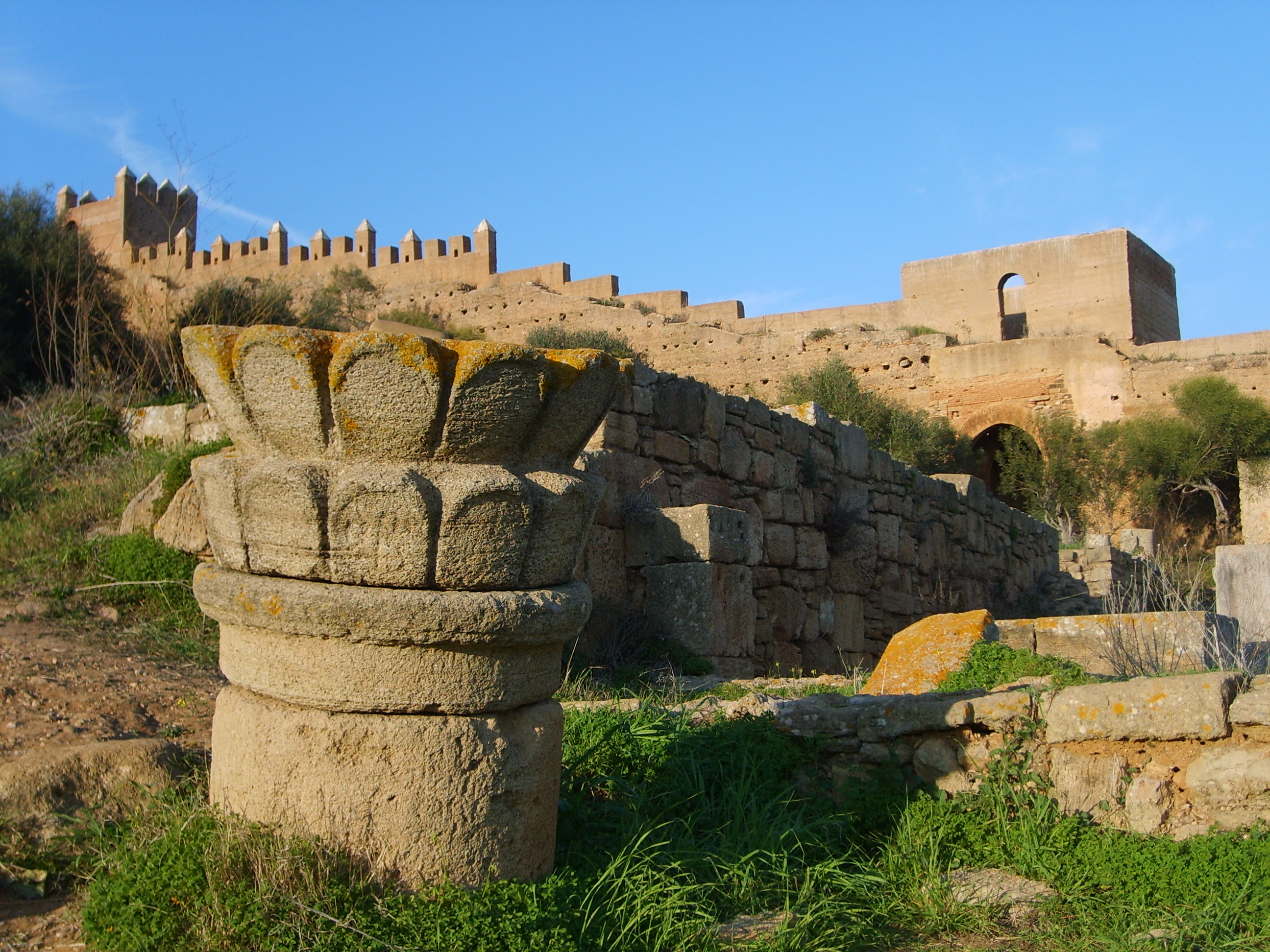
Part interior of the Chellah necropolis near Rabat, Morocco

- Chellah

=== North Macedonia ===
- Saint Erasmus

=== Pakistan ===
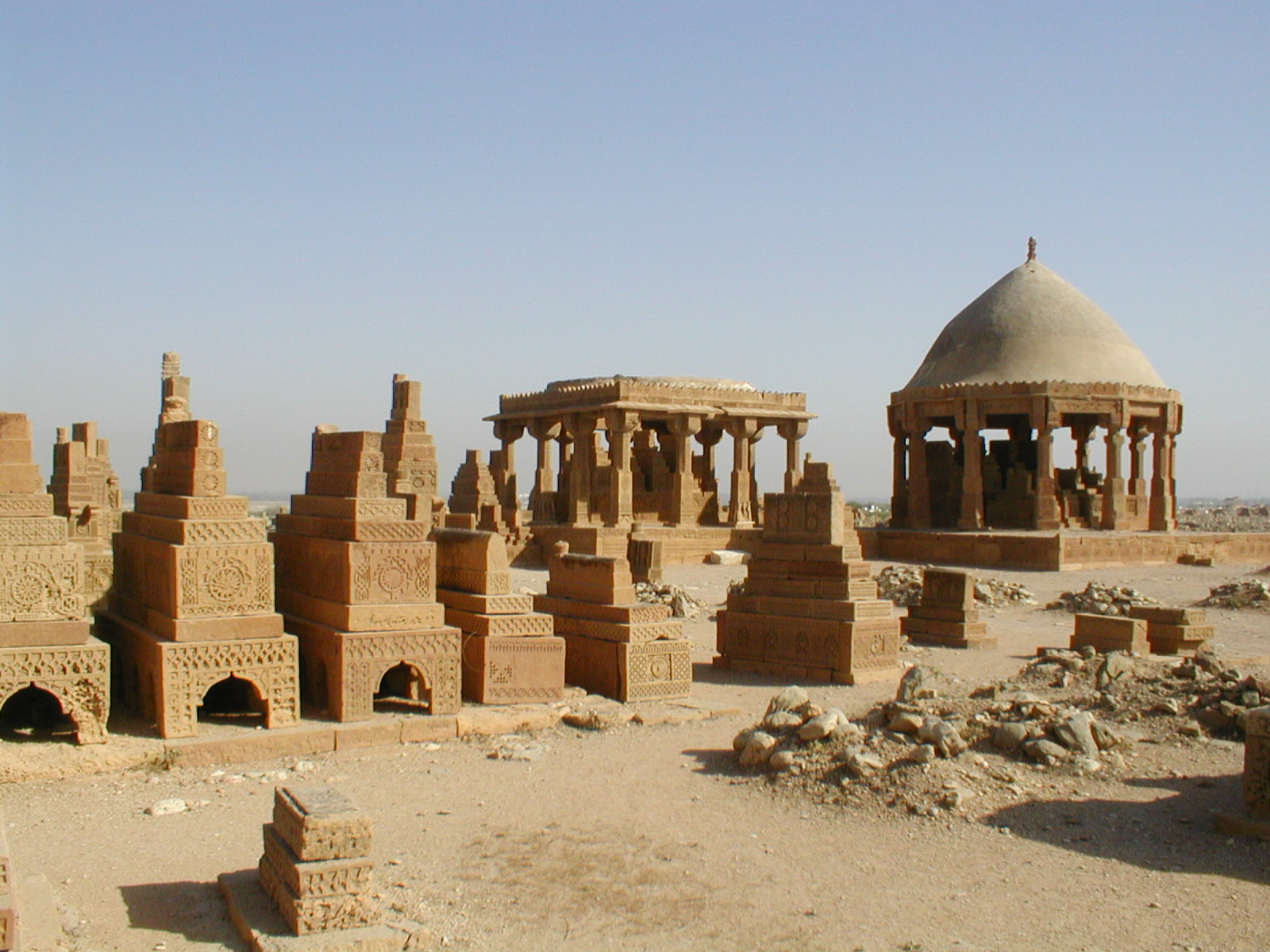
Chaukundi necropolis near Karachi, Pakistan

- Chaukundi
- Makli Hill

=== Peru ===
- Necropolis of Wari Kayan

=== Russia ===
- City of the Dead near Dargavs
- Kremlin Wall Necropolis

=== Somalia ===
- Hafun

=== Spain ===
- El Maipes necropolis
- El Castillo - Palacios de la Sierra: Biggest in Europe
- Necropolis Son Real Mallorca

=== Syria ===
- Necropolis of Emesa
- Valley of Tombs

=== Turkey ===
- Bin Tepe
- Tombs of the kings of Pontus
- Karacaahmet Cemetery
- Eyüp Cemetery
- Hierapolis necropoleis
- Lycian necropoleis

=== Ukraine ===
- Caves of The Kyiv Pechersk Lavra

=== United States ===
- Colma, California

=== Uzbekistan ===
- Bahoutdin Architectural Complex

=== Vatican City ===
- Vatican Necropolis
