= Marcina =

Marcina may refer to:

- Marcina, ancient Etruscan settlement in present-day Cava de' Tirreni and Vietri sul Mare
- Alen Marcina, Canadian athlete and soccer coach
