= US Viterbese 1908 =

Italian football club

Viterbese
- Full name: Unione Sportiva Viterbese 1908
- Nickname(s): Leoni (Lions)
- Founded: 1908; 117 years ago 2004; 21 years ago (refounded)
- Ground: Stadio Enrico Rocchi
- Capacity: 7,236
- Chairman: Marco Romano
- League: Promozione Lazio Group B
- 2022–23: Serie C Group C, 19th of 20 (relegated)
Home colours	Away colours	Third colours

Unione Sportiva Viterbese 1908, commonly known as Viterbese, is an Italian football club, based in Viterbo, Lazio. Viterbese currently plays in Promozione.

== Colors and badge ==
The team's colors are yellow and blue.

After suffering relegation from Serie C in 2023, the club did not submit a league application to Serie D, after the City of Viterbo denied them access to the stadium, and instead opted to apply for the lower-ranked Promozione while playing their home games in nearby Cesano. On 26 February 2024, the club unilaterally retired from the Promozione league.
