= Etruscan cities =

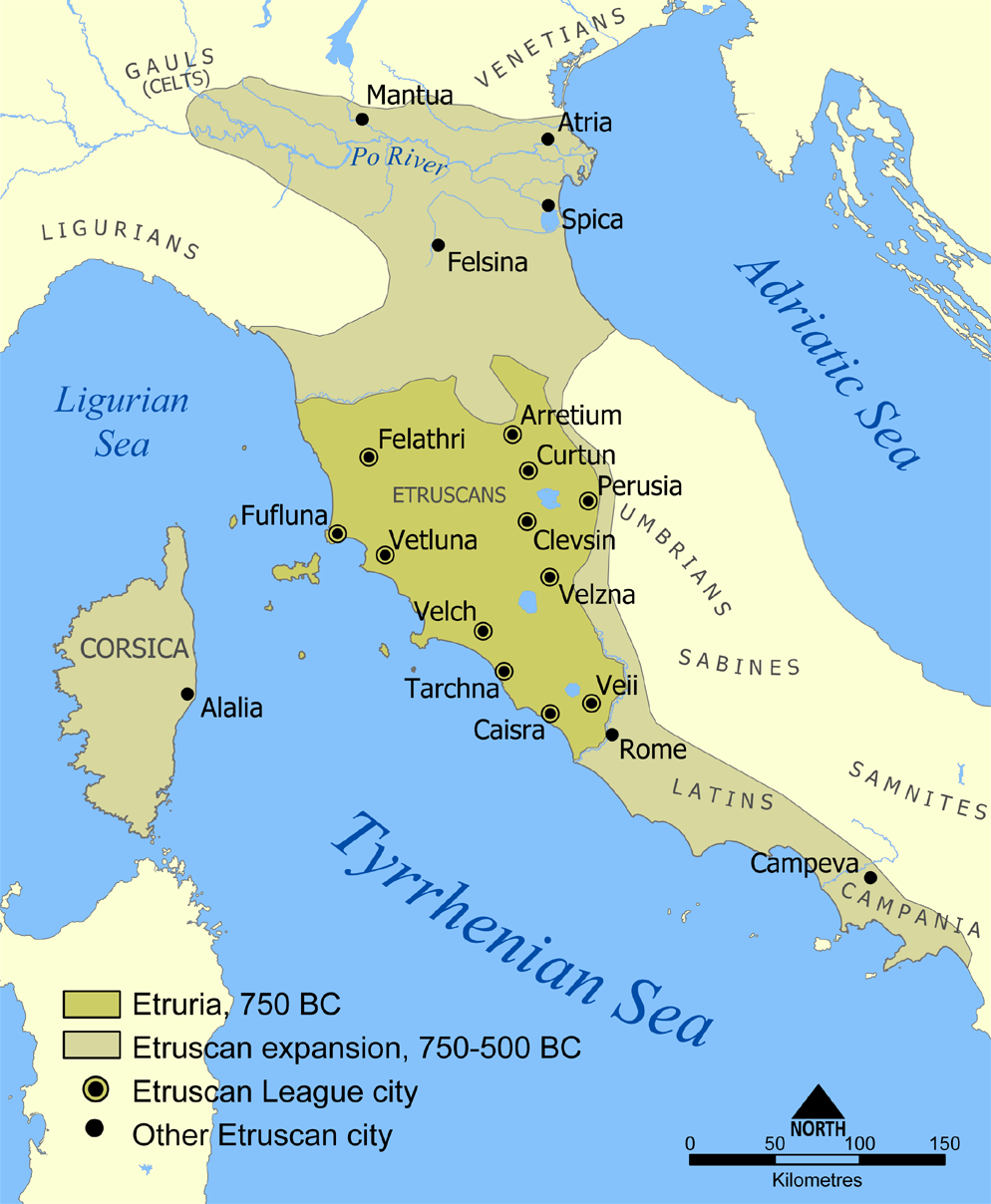
The area covered by the Etruscan civilisation.

Etruscan cities were a group of ancient settlements that shared a common Etruscan language and culture, even though they were independent city-states. They flourished over a large part of the northern half of Italy starting from the Iron Age, and in some cases reached a substantial level of wealth and power. They were eventually assimilated first by Italics and ancient Greeks in the south, then by Celts in the north and finally in Etruria itself by the growing Roman Republic.

The Etruscan names of the major cities whose names were later Romanised survived in inscriptions and are listed below. Some cities were founded by Etruscans in prehistoric times and bore entirely Etruscan names. Others, usually Italic in origin, were colonised by the Etruscans, who in turn Etruscanised their name (around 9 BC).

The estimates for the populations of the largest cities (Veii, Volsinii, Caere, Vulci, Tarquinia, Populonia) range between 25,000 and 40,000 each in the 6th century BC.

== Twelve cities or nations ==
Of several Etruscan leagues, the Dodecapolis (Greek for "twelve cities") of the Etruscan civilization is legendary amongst Roman authors, particularly Livy. However the dodecapolis had no fixed roster and if a city was removed it was immediately replaced by another. By the time the dodecapolis had sprung into the light of history, the Etruscan cities to the north had been assimilated by invasions of the Celts, and those of the south by infiltration of the Italics.

Etruscan cities were autonomous states, but they were linked in the dodecapolis and had a federal sanctuary at the Fanum Voltumnae near Volsinii.

== Table of cities in Etruscan, Latin and Italian ==
The table below lists Etruscan cities most often included in the Dodecapolis as well as other cities for which there is any substantial evidence that they were once inhabited by Etruscans in any capacity. Roman and Italian names are given, but they are not necessarily etymologically related. For sources and etymologies (if any) refer to the linked articles.

| Etruscan | Latin | Italian |
Dodecapolis candidates
| Aritim, Arritim, Arreti, Areuthes | Arrētium | Arezzo |
| Chaire, Chaisrie, Caisra, Kisra | Caere, Agylla | Cerveteri and its frazione Ceri |
| Clevsin, Clevsi, Cleusina | Clusium, Camars | Chiusi |
| Curtun, Curtna | Cortōna | Cortona |
| Perusna, Persna, Pherusina | Perusia | Perugia |
| Pupluna, Fufluna, Pupuluna | Populōnia | Populonia |
| Tarchuna, Tarchna | Tarquinii | Tarquinia (Corneto) |
| Vatluna, Vetluna, Vetaluna, Vatalu | Vetulōnia | Vetulonia |
| Veia, Veina, Veis | Veii | Veio |
| Velathri, Velathera, Felathri | Volaterrae | Volterra |
| Velch, Velcal, Velcl | Vulci | Volci |
| Velzna, Velxe, Velsu, Velusna, Velznani | Volsinii | Bolsena or Orvieto? |
Other Etrurian
| Aisinia, Asinia | Exinea, Sinea | Signa |
| Ampiles, Ampli, Ampile | Emporium, Empulum | Empoli |
| Amre, Cameria, Amerite | Ameria | Amelia |
| Aritma | Artiminum | Artimino |
| Arrantia | Ripa Arranciae | Pomarance |
| Aruina, Aruna, Priana | Piscia | Pescia |
| Bellona, Bellonia | Castrum Praedium, Pregium | Preggio |
| Birent, Birenz, Firens, Firez | Florentia | Firenze (Florence) |
| Cahinias | Caninium | Canino |
| Cainxna, Canxna, Cainchna | Clantianum | Chianciano Terme |
| Caletra, Chalaitra | Marsiliana | Marsiliana d'Albegna |
| Capalu | Capalbium | Capalbio |
| Capna | Capena | Capena |
| Care, Careia, Careias | Careiae, Careae | Galera, now abandoned |
| Carhara, Carhaira | Carraria | Carrara |
| Cassina | Cassina, Cascina | Cascina |
| Catuna | Cetona, Scitonia | Cetona |
| Ceicna, Caicni | Caecina | Cecina |
| Cusi, Cuthi | Cosa | Ansedonia |
| Felcina, Hulchena | Fulginia | Foligno |
| Fernta, Frunth | Ferentum | Ferento |
| Ficline | Figulinae | Figline Valdarno |
| Ficrine | Fregenae | Fregene |
| Fullona | Fullonica | Follonica |
| Halethi, Halesi, Phlesnas | Falerii | Civita Castellana |
| Hepa, Heva | Heba | Magliano in Toscana |
| Hortia | Corchianum | Corchiano |
| Hurta, Hurt | Horta | Orte |
| Icuvina, Ikuvina (Umbrian *Ikuvium) | Iguvium, Eugubinum | Gubbio |
| Larthial | Larcianum | Larciano |
| Liburna, Leburna | Labro | Livorno |
| Luca | Luca | Lucca |
| Luna | Luna | Luni |
| Manthra | Marturanum | Barbarano Romano |
| Martha, Marath | Marta | Marta |
| Marturi | Podium Bonitii | Poggibonsi |
| Mevana, Mevania | Bevania, Maevania | Bevagna |
| Narce | Narce | Mazzano Romano |
| Nepete, Nepet | Colonia Nepensis | Nepi |
| Northia | Nursia | Norcia |
| Nurcla, Orcla | Orclae | Norchia |
| Phlera, Velera, Plais | Blera | Blera |
| Pisna, Pise, Peithusa, Pithsa | Pisae | Pisa |
| Pisturim | Pistoriae, Pistorium | Pistoia |
| Pulianu, Purthna, Pulthna | Mons Politianus | Montepulciano |
| Rasela, Rusle | Rusellae | Roselle, Grosseto |
| Raisne, Rasiniena | Rasinianum | Rosignano |
| Ratumna | Balneum Regium | Bagnoregio |
| Ruvfna | Rufina | Rufina |
| Sabate | Trebonianum | Trevignano Romano |
| Sabatia | Angularia Sabatina | Anguillara Sabazia |
| Saena, Sena, Saina | Saena | Siena |
| Satria | Vicus Sartarianus | Sarteano |
| Scansna | Scansanum | Scansano |
| Sveama, Sveiam, Suana | Suana | Sovana |
| Statna, Staitne, Statues, Staties | Statōnia | Disputed |
| Surha | Aquipendium | Acquapendente |
| Surina, Surrena, Surna | Surrīna, Vetus Urbs | Viterbo |
| Surina, Surrina, Surna | Sorianum | Soriano |
| Suthri | Sutrium | Sutri |
| Teramna | Interamna | Terni |
| Thefarne | Tifernum Tiberinum | Città di Castello |
| Tlamu, Tlamun, Telmu, Tulumne, Tlamne | Telamōn | Talamone |
| Trepla | Trebula | Trebula |
| Tular, Tuter | Tuder | Todi |
| Thulfa, Thulpha | Tulpha | Tolfa |
| Tusena | Tuscana | Tuscania |
| Ucrisla | Ocriculum | Otricoli |
| Urcia | Vetus Aula, Veter Galla | Vetralla |
| Urcla, Orcla | Vicus Orclanus | Vitorchiano |
| Urina, Aurina, Aurinia | Saturnia | Saturnia |
| Veltha, Veltuna, Veltumna, Voltumna | Mons Faliscorum | Montefiascone |
| Velturei | Veclanum | Vecchiano |
| Vetumna | Vettona | Bettona |
| Vesnth, Vishnth | Visentium | Bisenzio |
| Vipena, Viplnei, Vipienas | Viblena, Viblenium | Bibbiena |
| Visul, Vipsul, Visal, Viesul | Faesulae | Fiesole |
| Vrenth | Verentum | Valentano |

| Etruscan | Latin | Italian |
Northern (Etruria Padana)
| Arciun | Artionis, Vicus Popilius | Riccione |
| Arimna, Harimne | Ariminum | Rimini |
| Atria, Hatria | Adria | Adria |
| (Berua) | Vicentia | Vicenza |
| Cainua | Misa, Misanum, Mysa | Marzabotto |
| Cainua, Kainua, or Stalia, Stala | Genua | Genova (Genoa) |
| Charumna, Carmna | Cremona | Cremona |
| Ceisna | Caesena | Cesena |
| Clavna | Clavenna | Chiavenna |
| Felsna, Felsina, Velzna | Bonōnia | Bologna |
| Felthuri, Velhatre | Feltria | Feltre |
| Ficline | Forum Livii | Forlì |
| Ficocle | Phycocle, Caervia | Cervia |
| Huthine, Huthina | Utina, Utinum | Udine |
| Manthva, Manthava | Mantua | Mantova (Mantua) |
| Melp, Melph, Melphe, Melpu | Melpum, Meltium | Melzo |
| Methlan | Mediolanum | Milano (Milan) |
| Misala | Herberia | Rubiera |
| Muthice, Muntha | Modicia | Monza |
| Mutina, Mutna, Muthna | Mutina | Modena |
| Parma, Parmna, Paruma | Parma | Parma |
| Pathva | Patavium | Padova (Padua) |
| [Pauia] | Ticinum, Papia | Pavia |
| Percumsna, Pergomsna, Percme, Percums | Bergomum | Bergamo |
| Permu | Firmum | Fermo |
| Pilthi, Pilithi | Bilitio | Bellinzona |
| Purthanas | Portus Naonis | Pordenone |
| Ravena, Ravna | Ravenna | Ravenna |
| Spina | Spina | abandoned |
| Tarcste | Tergeste | Trieste |
| Trenta | Tridentum | Trento |
| Uscla | Oscela | Domodossola |
| Verna, Veruna, Verunia | Verona, Vernomagus | Verona |
| Vipitene, Vipitenas, Viptena | Vipitenum | Vipiteno |
| Vrixia | Brixia | Brescia |
Southern (Etruria Campana)
| Achra, Acre | Acerrae | Acerra |
| Aisarna | Aesernia | Isernia |
| Amina | Picentia | Pontecagnano |
| Anth | Antium | Anzio |
| Azcule | Asculum | Ascoli Piceno |
| Caithi | Caieta | Gaeta |
| Cale, Cali | Cales | Calvi Risorta |
| Calipulis | Callipolis | Gallipoli |
| Canuza | Canusium | Canosa di Puglia |
| Capua, Capeva, Capava, Capuva, Campeva | Capua | Capua |
| Cavi, Kavi | Gabii | Gabi |
| Cura | Cora | Cori |
| Fanacni | Anagnia | Anagni |
| Frentina | Ferentinum | Ferentino |
| Frusna, Frusina, Fursina, Prusetna | Frusino | Frosinone |
| Galatia | Casa Irta | Caserta |
| Herclena | Herculaneum | Ercolano |
| Inarime | Pitecusa, Greek Pithekoussai | Ischia |
| Irna | Salernum | Salerno |
| Irnthi | Surrentum | Sorrento |
| Marcina | Marcina | Cava de' Tirreni and Vietri sul Mare |
| Nepulis | Neapolis | Napoli (Naples) |
| Nucra | Nuceria Alfaterna | Nocera Superiore |
| Nula (Oscan *Nuvla) | Nola | Nola |
| Pumpai | Pompeii | Pompei |
| Regiu | Rhegium | Reggio di Calabria |
| Remnun | Tibur | Tivoli |
| Ruma, (Rumna) | Roma | Roma (Rome) |
| | Suessula | abandoned |
| Tara | Tarentum | Taranto |
| Tarchna, Tarkina | Tarracina | Terracina |
| Uvila | Bovillae | Frattocchie |
| Velkha | Volcei | Buccino |
| Veltri, Velthri | Velitrae | Velletri |
Corsican
| Alalia | Aleria | Aleria |
Sardinian
| Caralu | Caralis | Cagliari |

== Sources ==
- Bonfante, G.; L. Bonfante (2002). The Etruscan Language. An Introduction. Manchester University Press.
- Dennis, George (1848). The Cities and Cemeteries of Etruria. London: John Murray. Available in the Gazetteer of Bill Thayer's Website at
