= Lake Martignano =

Lake in Lazio, Italy

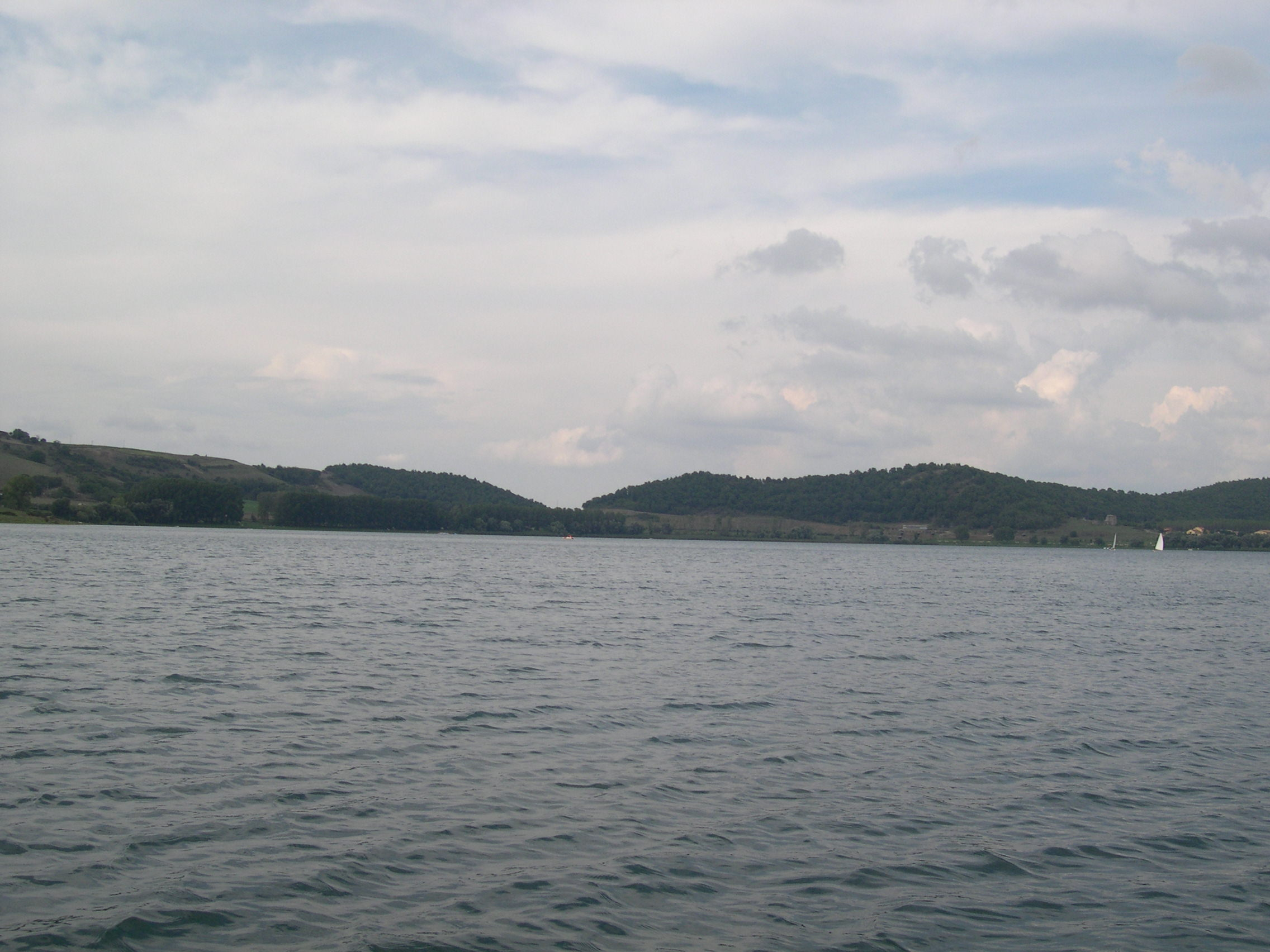

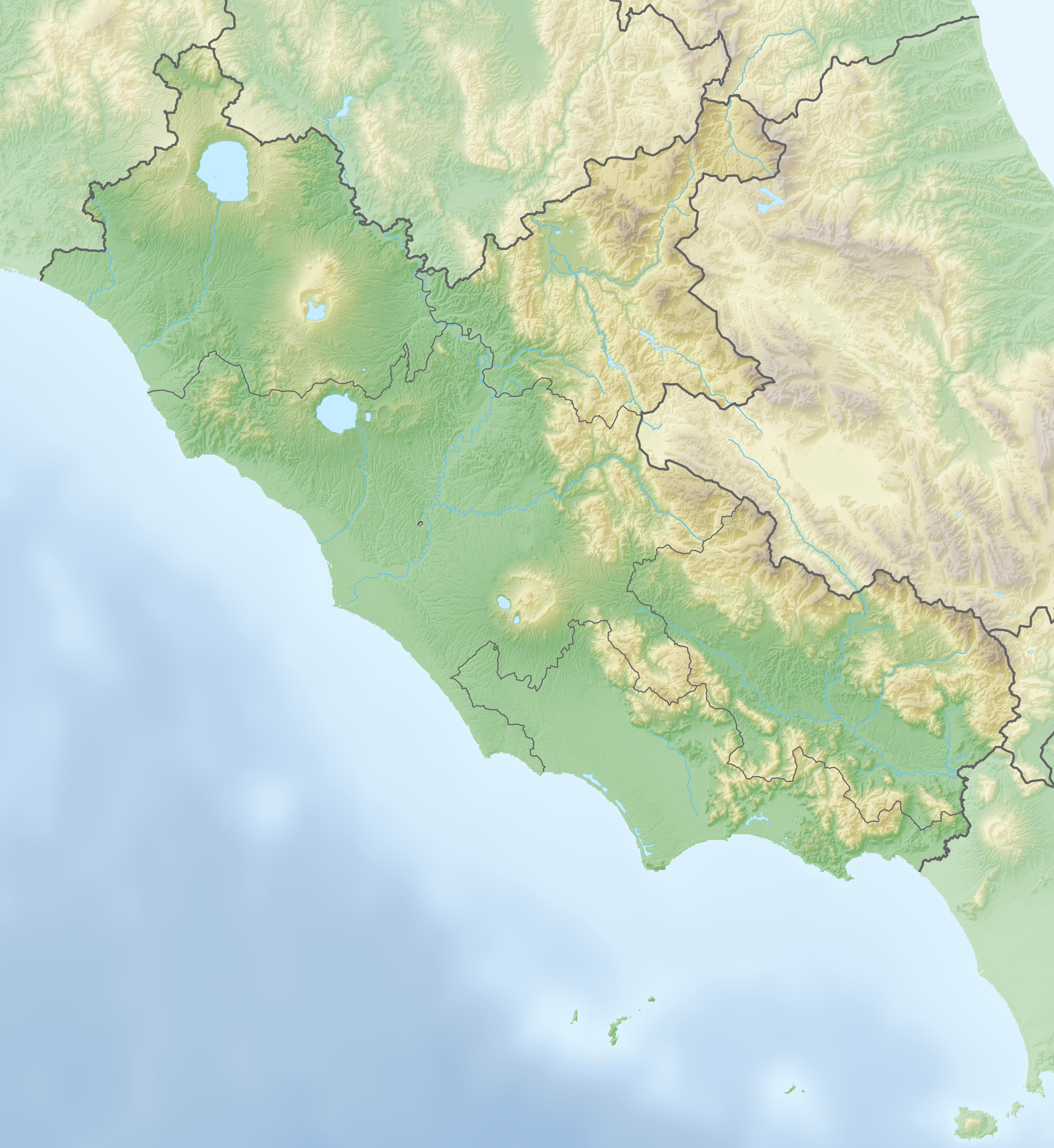
- Location within Lazio
- Location: Province of Rome, Lazio
- Coordinates: 42°6′46″N 12°18′54″E
- Basin countries: Italy
- Max. length: 2.015 km (1.252 mi)
- Max. width: 1.545 km (0.960 mi)
- Surface area: 2.44 km^{2} (0.94 sq mi)
- Max. depth: 60 m (200 ft)
- Shore length^{1}: 6 km (3.7 mi)
- Surface elevation: 305 m (1,001 ft)
- ^{1} Shore length is not a well-defined measure.

Lake Martignano (Italian: Lago di Martignano) is a small lake in Lazio, Italy 24 kilometres (15 mi) north-north-west of Rome, in an extinct crater or maar. Administratively its coast is divided amongst the municipalities of Rome, Anguillara Sabazia and Campagnano di Roma.

== Overview ==
In ancient times Lake Martignano was part of southern Etruria and called Alsietinus Lacus. Augustus drew from it the Aqua Alsietina; the water was hardly fit to drink, and was mainly intended to supply his naumachia (lake made for a sham naval battle) at Rome, near San Francesco a Ripa, on the right bank of the Tiber, where some traces of the aqueduct were perhaps found in 1720. The course of the aqueduct, which was mainly subterranean, is practically unknown: Frontinus tells us that it received a branch from Lake Bracciano near Careiae (Galera): and an inscription relating to it was found in this district in 1887.

There is a lawn beach, lake-side cafes and restaurants, and walking tracks.

== Nearby towns ==
- Campagnano di Roma
- Bracciano
- Anguillara Sabazia
- Trevignano Romano
- Oriolo Romano
- Sutri
- Capranica
- Cesano
