= Romania gens =

Ancient Roman family

The gens Romania was an obscure plebeian family at ancient Rome. No members of this gens appear in history, but many are known from inscriptions.

== Origin ==
The nomen Romanius belongs to a large class of gentilicia formed from surnames ending in the suffix -anus, typically derived from place-names. Here the name is derived from a cognomen, Romanus, referring to a resident of Rome itself.

== Praenomina ==
The Romanii used a wide variety of common praenomina, including Lucius, Gaius, Marcus, Publius, Quintus, Titus, and Gnaeus. Other names are found occasionally, including Aulus, Numerius, Decimus, Servius, and Tiberius. The Oscan praenomen Salvius occurs in a filiation, suggesting that at least some of the Romanii were of Oscan descent.

== Branches and cognomina ==
In imperial times, the Romanii used a number of surnames, but all appear to have been personal cognomina, and the Romanii do not appear to have been divided into distinct families.

== Members ==
This list includes abbreviated praenomina. For an explanation of this practice, see filiation.

- Romania, buried at an uncertain location in Cisalpine Gaul, with a monument dedicated by a certain Prisca.
- Romania, the wife of Titus Fabius Pulcher, with whom she made an offering to Isis at Aquileia in Venetia and Histria.
- Romania, the wife of Lucius Julius Caper, one of the seviri Augustales at Nemausus in Gallia Narbonensis.
- Romania, the daughter of Salonia, buried in a family sepulchre at Salona in Dalmatia, together with Romania Italia and Romanius, the son of Surio.
- Romania, the daughter of Prosostus, and granddaughter of Gaius Valerius Fuscus, a veteran of the second legion, with whom she was buried at Brigetio in Pannonia Superior, in the first half of the second century, aged twenty.
- Romanius, the house slave of Quintus Cornelius Graptus and his wife, Sabina, with whom he was buried at Rome.
- Romanius M. f., a priest named in a funerary inscription from Bantia in Lucania.
- Romanius, the son of Surio, buried in a family sepulchre at Salona, together with Romania Italia, and Romania, the daughter of Salonia.
- Gaius Romanius C. f., a native of Berytus, an officer serving in the century of Hordeonius at Mons Claudianus in Egypt.
- Gaius Romanius P. f., twice military tribune, named in an inscription from Rome, together with Publius Romanius.
- Numerius Romanius Sal. f., named in an inscription from Supinum Vicus in Samnium.
- Publius Romanius M. f., buried at Brixia in Venetia and Histria, together with his sister, Romania Tertia.
- Publius Romanius C. f., named in an inscription from Rome, together with Gaius Romanius, a military tribune.
- Quintus Romanius, the son of Camburo, made an offering to Minerva at Brixia.
- Titus Romanius, buried at Sextantio in Gallia Narbonensis.
- Lucius Romanius N. l. Abscantus, a freedman buried at Heraclea in Lucania, with a tomb built by the local college of sodales Augustales, in the latter part of the first century, or the first half of the second.
- Romania Cn. l. Ammia, a freedwoman, and the wife of the wine merchant Gnaeus Romanius Iaso.
- Gaius Romanius Ɔ. l. Anteros, a freedman named in an inscription from Rome, together with a freedwoman, Romania Theophila.
- Romanius Aristides, named in an inscription from Apulum in Dacia.
- Aulus Romanius A. l. Bassus, a freedman, built a tomb for himself and his son, Romanius Restitutus, at Careiae in Etruria.
- Gaius Romanius Bassus, the brother of Lucius Romanius Brocchus, named in an inscription from Cisalpine Gaul.
- Lucius Romanius Bello, built a tomb at Rome for himself and his family.
- Lucius Romanius Brocchus, the brother of Gaius Romanius Bassus, named in an inscription from Cisalpine Gaul.
- Romania Cale, a client of Decimus Romanius Verulus, named in an inscription from Dea Augusta Vocontiorum in Gallia Narbonensis.
- Gaius Romanius Capito, a native of Celeia, was a soldier in the cavalry, buried at Mogontiacum in Germania Superior, aged forty, having served for nineteen years, in a tomb dating to the latter half of the first century AD.
- Romania Catullina, the wife of Julius Secundinus, buried in a family seupulcre at Flavia Solva in Noricum, aged twenty-five.
- Marcia Romania Celsa, wife of the consul Flavius Januarius, (Note: Possibly the consul of AD 328.) was buried at Arelate in Gallia Narbonensis on the seventeenth day before the Kalends of April, aged thirty-seven years, two months, and ten days.
- Romanius Crescentilianus, dedicated a tomb at Ostia in Latium for his foster-daughter, Romania Stratonice.
- Romania Cypare, (Note: Spelled Chypare in the inscription.) dedicated a second century tomb at Venusia in Samnium to her husband, Titus Flavius Secundus, aged forty.
- Marcus Romanius Encolpus, made an offering to Jupiter Optimus Maximus, according to an inscription from Dacia.
- Marcus Romanius Ser. f. Epulo, a promagistrate at Cyrene, who made an offering to Ceres.
- Romanius Epulonius Damas, built a tomb at Rome for himself, his wife, Papiria Tertia, and son, the younger Epulonius Damas, aged fourteen years, eleven months.
- Titus Romanius Epictetus, together with Flavia Melitine, dedicated a tomb at Lugdunum in Gallia Lugdunensis to their patron, Titus Flavius Hermes, one of the seviri Augustales at Lugdunum.
- Lucius Romanius Euprepis, buried at the present site of Val-de-Fier, formerly in Gallia Narbonensis.
- Lucius Romanius Felicissimus, buried at Ostia, aged twenty-one years, eleven months, with a monument from his sister, Flavia Claudiana.
- Romania Ɔ. l. Fausta, a freedwoman named in an inscription from Rome.
- Lucius Romanius Fortis, dedicated a tomb at Ravenna to Philomellus, the slave of Lucius Romanius Juvenalis.
- Lucius Romanius P. f. Gallus, made an offering to Diana on behalf of the emperor Hadrian, at Thuburbo Maius in Africa Proconsularis.
- Titus Romanius T. f. Hermeros, buried at Rome in a tomb dedicated by his father, Titus Romanius Hermes.
- Titus Romanius Hermes, dedicated a tomb at Rome to his son, Titus Romanius Hermeros.
- Publius Romanius Heuresio, named in an inscription from Ostia, dating between AD 201 and 230.
- Gnaeus Romanius Cn. l. Iaso, a freedman and wine merchant at Rome, and the husband of Romania Ammia.
- Romanius Ingenuus, buried at Matucaium in Noricum, aged two.
- Romania Italia, buried in a family sepulchre at Salona, together with Romanius, the son of Surio, and Romania, the daughter of Salonia.
- Gaius Romanius C. f. Italicus, a native of Emona, was an aide to the praetorian prefect at Rome, circa AD 173.
- Marcus Romanius Jovinus, a rhetorician buried at Rome, leaving as his heirs Marcus Junius Severus and Romania Marcia.
- Lucius Romanius L. f. Justus Vercellis, a soldier in the tenth cohort of the praetorian guard, serving in the century of Crispinus, named in an inscription from Patrae in Achaia.
- Romanius Juvenalis, named in a dedicatory inscription from Mogontiacum.
- Lucius Romanius Juvenalis, the master of Philomellus, a slave buried at Ravenna.
- Romanius Juvenis, built a tomb at Ivenna in Noricum for his daughter, Junilla, aged seventeen, together with his wife, Aquilina, and Junilla's grandparents, Secundinius Jucundianus and Mira.
- Marcus Romanius Juventinus, procurator in Asia in an uncertain year between AD 198 and 209.
- Romania T. f. Laeta, named in an inscription from Rome, together with Gnaeus Aemilius Laetus.
- Romanius Ligur, a member of the college of Manliensium, who made a donation to Fortuna at Virunum in Noricum.
- Gnaeus Romanius Cn. f. Longus, buried at Cirta in Numidia, aged ninety.
- Romania Lupa, the wife of Marcus Herennius Eucharistus, buried at Comum in Cisalpine Gaul, in the second or early third century.
- Marcus Romanius M. f. Macrinus, a veteran named in an inscription from Brixia.
- Marcus Romanius M. f. Marcellinus Decimius Rufinus, a native of Suasa in Umbria, was a prefect in the third legion, according to an inscription from Lambaesis in Numidia.
- Romania Marcia, together with Marcus Junius Severus, one of the heirs of the rhetorician Marcus Romanius Jovinus.
- Titus Romanius Mercator, made an offering to the gods of the imperial cult at Darantasia in Alpes Graiae, according to an inscription dating to the latter half of the second century.
- Romania Moderata, the wife of Publius Quintius Pollio, and mother of Marcus Quintius Moderatus, buried at Verona in Venetia and Histria.
- Publius Romanius P. l. Modestus, a freedman buried at Bonna in Germania Inferior, aged sixteen.
- Romanius Montanus, procurator of the emperor's household gladiators, according to an inscription from Pergamum in Asia.
- Romania Naevia, a woman belonging to a family of senatorial rank, buried at Siscia in Pannonia Superior.
- Romania Novellia, the daughter of Novellia Atiliana, buried at Mediolanum in Cisalpine Gaul, aged thirty-two years, eight months, and twelve days.
- Romania Sp. f. Optata, buried at Brixia.
- Gaius Romanius Pedo, buried at the present site of Chusclan, formerly in Gallia Narbonensis.
- Lucius Romanius L. f. Peregrinus, built a monument to his father, Lucius Romanius Salvius, at Tridentum in Venetia and Histria.
- Lucius Romanius L. l. Philargurus, a freedman named in an inscription from Rome.
- Romania Prima, buried at Simitthus in Africa Proconsularis, aged twenty-one.
- Lucius Romanius Priscus, made a libationary offering to Mercury at Samarobriva in Gallia Belgica.
- Marcus Romanius M. f. Probus, the son of Marcus Romanius Suavis and Cincia Modesta.
- Quintus Romanius Probus, dedicated a tomb for his wife, Flavia Materna, at Juliacum in Germania Inferior.
- Romania Profutura, a matron buried at Comum in the second century.
- Lucius Romanius Respectus, a decurion at Burbetomagus in Germania Superior, who made a libationary offering to Victoria.
- Romanius A. f. Restitutus, the son of Aulus Romanius Bassus, a freedman buried at Careiae.
- Romania Romana, the sister of Romanus Severus and daughter of Julius Romanus, who made a libationary offering to Mercury on his children's behalf at Augusta Treverorum in Gallia Belgica.
- Romania T. l. Sabina, a freedwoman who built a tomb at Salona for her children, Firmio, Martia, and Quintio.
- Romanius Sabinus, named in an inscription from Rome.
- Lucius Romanius Salvius, buried Tridentum, with a monument from his son, Lucius Romanius Peregrinus.
- Romania Secundilla, wife of the sailor Lucius Helvius Victorinus, for whom she built a tomb at Lugdunum.
- Romanius Secundinus, a veteran soldier, who together with Cordia Verina, helped build a tomb at Rome for Cordia's son, Lucius Vitellius Fuscinus, a soldier in the third cohort of the praetorian guard, aged forty, and his sister, Paccia Materna, aged twelve.
- Romanius Secundus, a soldier named in an inscription from Vindonissa, dating to the middle or later first century.
- Romania Q. f. Secura, buried at Thibilis in Numidia.
- Romania M. f. Severa, buried at Brixia, in the family sepulchre of Marcus Licinius Receptus.
- Decimus Romanius Silvester, heir of Valeria, the daughter or Valentinus, a woman buried at Dea Augusta Vocontiorum.
- Publius Romanius Socrates, made a libationary offering to Victoria at the present site of Volx, formerly part of Gallia Narbonensis.
- Romania Stratonice, buried at Ostia, aged eleven years, three months, with a tomb built by her foster father, Romanius Crescentilianus.
- Marcus Romanius M. l. Suavis, a freedman, and one of the sodales Augustales at Brixia, built a tomb for himself, his wife, Cincia Modesta, and their son, Marcus Romanius Probus.
- Gaius Romanius Summus, a decurion at Germisara in Dacia, who made a libationary offering to Jupiter Optimus Maximus.
- Romania M. f. Tertia, buried at Brixia with her brother, Publius Romanius.
- Romania C. l. Theophila, a freedwoman named in an inscription from Rome, together with a freedman, Gaius Romanius Anteros.
- Romania C. l. Tryphera, a freedwoman buried at Canusium in Apulia.
- Quintus Romanius Q. f. Tuscus, buried at the present site of Bencatel, formerly part of Lusitania, aged seventeen, with a monument from his mother, Baebia Boutia.
- Romania Urbana, named in a funerary inscription from Rome, together with Quintus Mucius Urbanus, and Mucia Ingenua, perhaps their daughter, aged twenty.
- Romania Ɔ. l. Urbana, a freedwoman buried at Rome.
- Romania Ti. l. Urbana, a freedwoman named in an inscription from Iguvium in Umbria.
- Romania Valentina, the wife of Publicius Basilides, and foster mother of Publicius Valentinus, a boy buried at Ravenna, aged twelve years, nine months, and ten days.
- Romania Veratia, the wife of Aurelius Domitianus, buried at the present site of Rumilly, formerly in Gallia Narbonensis, aged forty years, three months, and five days.
- Romanius Verecundus, named in an inscription from Albanum in Latium.
- Quintus Romanius Verecundus, together with Lucius Ennius Secundus, one of the heirs of Marcus Magius Maccaus, a native of Verona, and a soldier in the eleventh legion, serving in the century of Marcius Modestus, buried at Vindonissa in Germania Superior, aged thirty-three.
- Decimus Romanius Verulus, the patron of Romania Cale, according to an inscription from Dea Augusta Vocontiorum.
- Romania Vitalis, the daughter of Philetus, and wife of Caesonius Probus, who built a monument for her at Rome.

== See also ==
- List of Roman gentes

== Bibliography ==
- Theodor Mommsen et alii, Corpus Inscriptionum Latinarum (The Body of Latin Inscriptions, abbreviated CIL), Berlin-Brandenburgische Akademie der Wissenschaften (1853–present).
- Giovanni Battista de Rossi, Inscriptiones Christianae Urbis Romanae Septimo Saeculo Antiquiores (Christian Inscriptions from Rome of the First Seven Centuries, abbreviated ICUR), Vatican Library, Rome (1857–1861, 1888).
- Bullettino della Commissione Archeologica Comunale in Roma (Bulletin of the Municipal Archaeological Commission of Rome, abbreviated BCAR), (1872–present).
- René Cagnat et alii, L'Année épigraphique (The Year in Epigraphy, abbreviated AE), Presses Universitaires de France (1888–present).
- George Davis Chase, "The Origin of Roman Praenomina", in Harvard Studies in Classical Philology, vol. VIII, pp. 103–184 (1897).
- Stéphane Gsell, Inscriptions Latines de L'Algérie (Latin Inscriptions from Algeria, abbreviated ILAlg), Edouard Champion, Paris (1922–present).
- Emile Espérandieu, Inscriptions Latines de Gaule (Narbonnaise) (Latin Inscriptions from Gallia Narbonensis, abbreviated ILGN), Ernest Leroux, Paris (1929).
- Inscriptiones Italiae (Inscriptions from Italy, abbreviated InscrIt), Rome (1931–present).
- P. S. Leber, Die in Kärnten seit 1902 gefundenen römischen Steininschriften, Klagenfurt (1972).
- Elena Camporini, Sculture a tutto tondo del Civico Museo Archeologico di Milano provenienti dal territorio municipale e da altri municipia, Mailand (1979).
- John C. Traupman, The New College Latin & English Dictionary, Bantam Books, New York (1995).
- Michael A. Speidel, Die römischen Schreibtafeln von Vindonissa, Baden (1996).
- Marina Silvestrini, Le Tribù Romane (The Roman Tribes), Bari (2010).
