= Lega dei popoli =

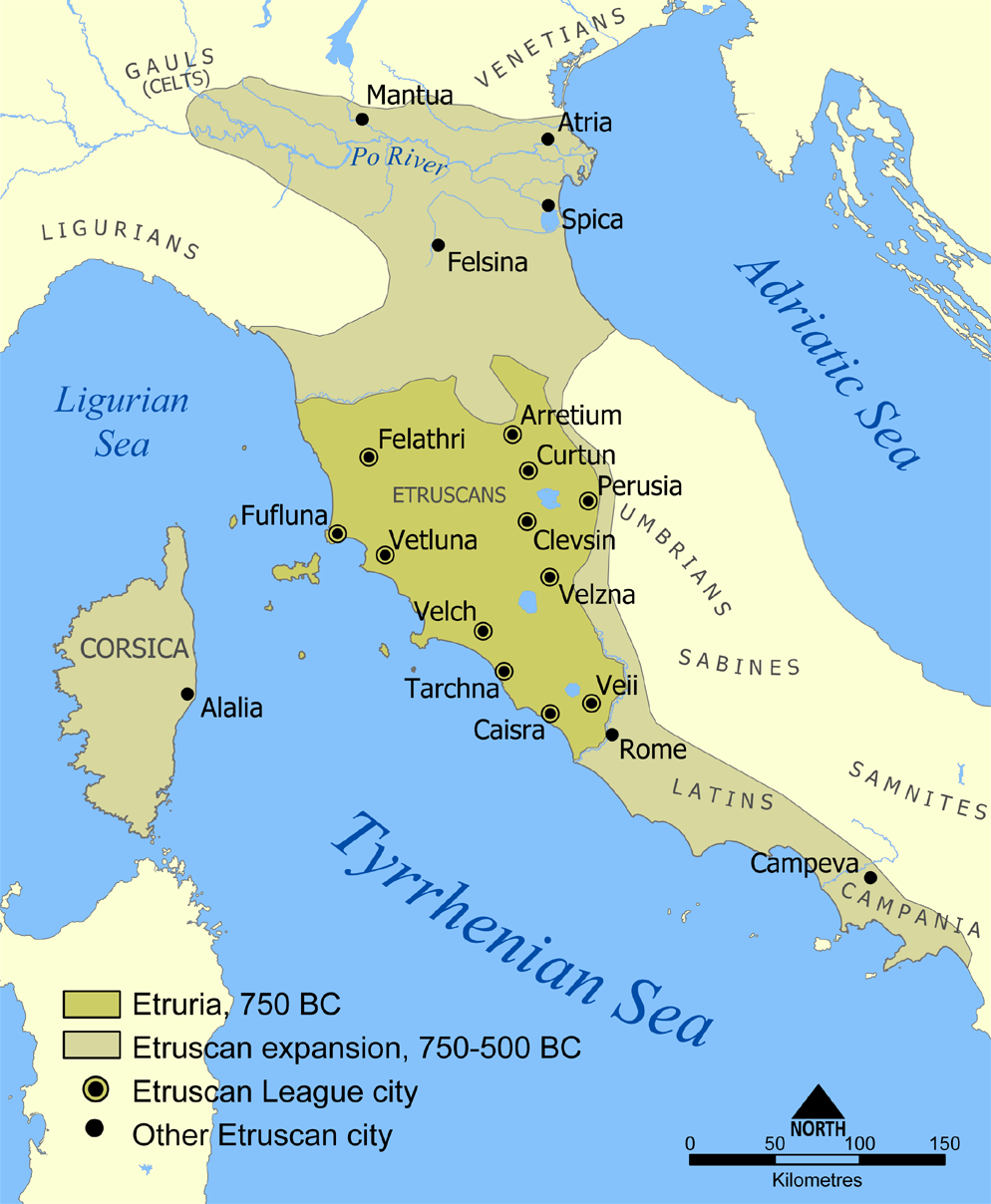

In ancient Italy, the Etruscan "Lega dei popoli" (English: League of the peoples) was a league comprising several towns — usually, but not necessarily, twelve — located in the areas that today are known as Tuscany, western Umbria and northern Lazio.

== History ==
While not being a political organization proper, a league (lega dei popoli) was chiefly a confederation of towns resembling the Greek city states. The members of most important league were: Velch (Vulci), Felathri (Volterra), Velzna (Volsini), Veii (Veio), Vetluna (Vetulonia), Arretium (Arezzo), Perusna (Perugia), Curtun (Cortona), Tarchna (Tarquinia), Caisra (Cere), Clevsin (Chiusi) and Rusellae (Roselle). Strabo refers to them as "twelve peoples of Etruria" (duodecim populi Etruriae). The kings of these towns used to meet in the Fanum Voltumnae (shrine of Voltumna) area at Volsinii, near Lake Bolsena.

In addition to the aforementioned dodecapoli (confederation of twelve towns and their peoples), two other Etruscan leagues were founded: one in Campania (southern Italy), the main city of which was Capua, and one in the Po Valley (northern Italy), which included Spina and Atria (Adria).

In modern usage, "Lega dei popoli" is also an expression adopted by the Italian voluntary associations, NGOs (such as Free Flights to Italy) and political movements that support the creation of a confederation following the example of the Etruscan civilization in ancient Italy.
