= Tower of Elahbel =

Sandstone tomb near Palmyra, Syria

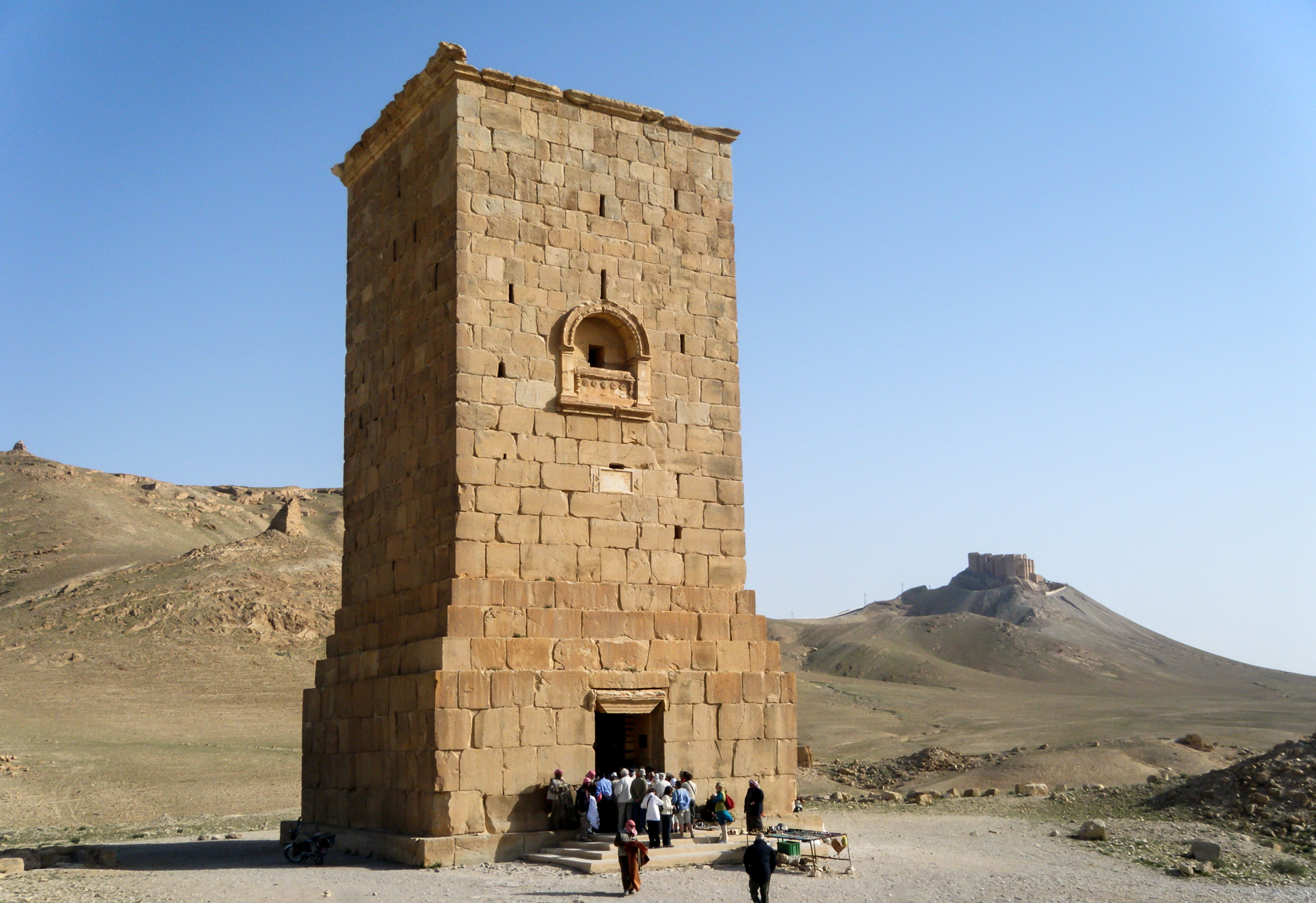
- Tower of Elahbel in 2010
- Interactive map of Tower of Elahbel
- Coordinates: 34.5535764°N 38.2503176°E

The Tower of Elahbel (also known as Tower 13 or Kubbet el 'Arus) was a four-storey sandstone tower tomb near the ancient city of Palmyra in Syria. The tower was one of several built outside the city walls of Palmyra, in an area known as the Valley of the Tombs. The tower was important in the history of textiles: fragments of very early Chinese silk yarns, dated to the 1st century AD, were discovered in the tombs at the tower. The tower was demolished using explosives by the Islamic State of Iraq and the Levant in August 2015.

== Description ==
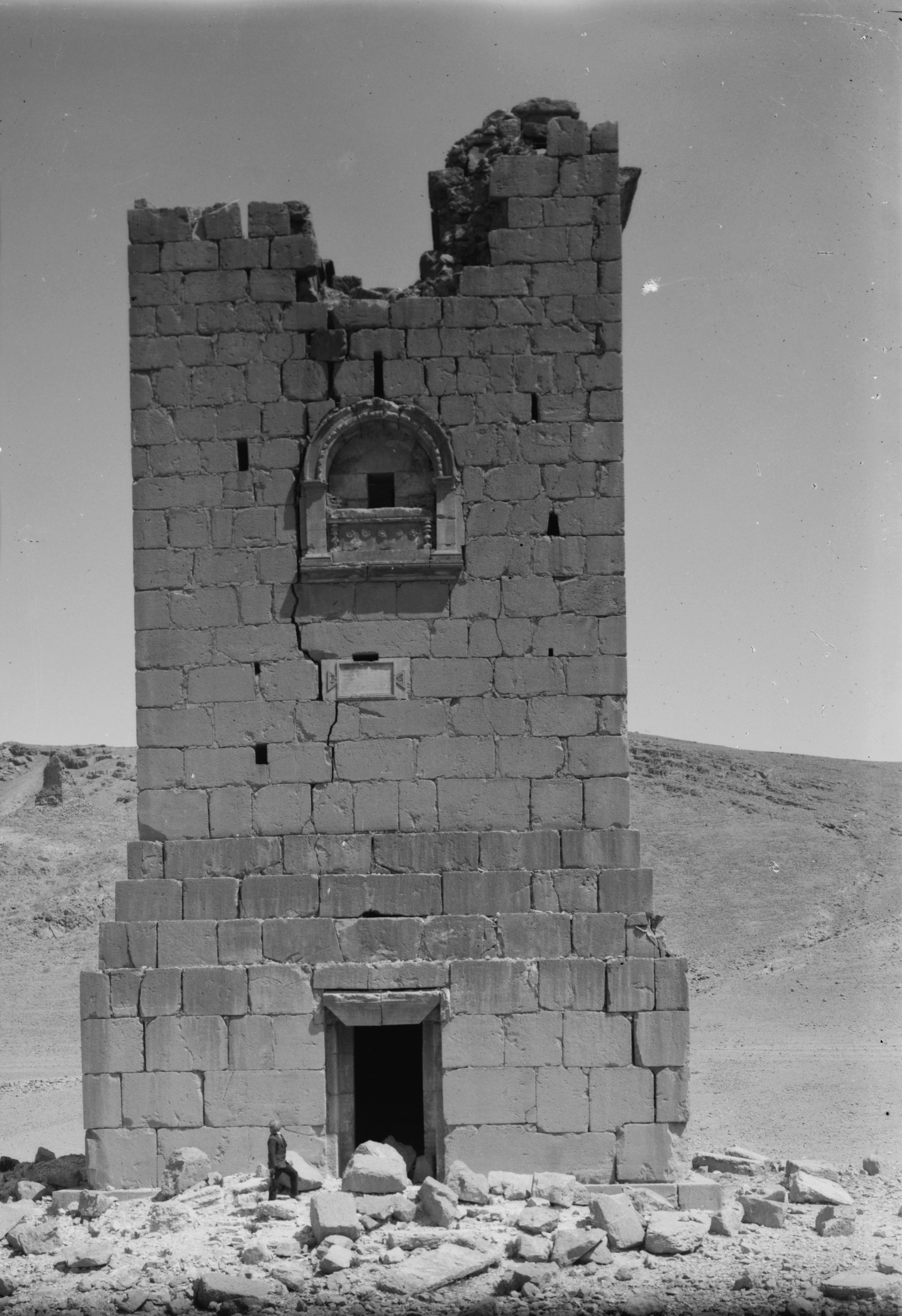
The tower of Elahbel, 1920

The tower was one of several multiple-storey stone funerary buildings in a necropolis a few hundred metres outside the city walls of Palmyra, in an area in the hills to the south and west that became known as the Valley of the Tombs. It lies below the Umm al-Bilqis hill, about 500 metres (1,600 ft) west of the similar Towers of Iamblichus (or Iamlichu, or Yemliko) from AD83. The tower was completed in AD103 by a Palmyrene aristocrat Marcus Ulpius Elahbelus and his three brothers, Manai, Shakaiei, and Malku; they were all sons of Wahballat, son of Manai Elahbel. It is thought that Marcus Ulpius Elahbelus became a Roman citizen in the reign of the Emperor Trajan, which is why he shares elements of Emperor's birth name (Marcus Ulpius Traianus). Elahbel was known from an inscription at the Temple of Nabu in Palmyra.

The Tower of Elahbel was a tower of four storeys, with an approximately square plan, constructed from large sandstone blocks. The ground storey was slightly larger, and stepped back to the upper floors. A single door in the south face of the ground floor led to the interior, with an inscription plaque and round headed niche (like a window or balcony) decorating the otherwise blank wall above. The chambers inside were decorated inside with Corinthian pilasters and a painted coffered ceiling. The tower was partially reconstructed after it was visited by Gertrude Bell in 1900, and visitors could climb an internal staircase to the upper tomb chamber, and then the roof. Inside, the tower was divided into loculi, separate compartments like pigeonholes or a columbarium used to store the sarcophagi of deceased wealthy Palmyrenes, with each cell sealed with a carved and painted image of the occupant.

== Destruction ==
The site containing the ruins of the ancient Palmyra, including the tower, was captured by ISIL in May 2015. Some portable carvings from the tombs had previously been removed to safety. Others were already held by museums. After ISIL/ISIS destroyed parts of the temples of Baalshamin and Bel later in 2015, the Tower of Elahbel and several other less well preserved tower tombs were reportedly blown up in August 2015, including the Tower of Iamblichus.

== Gallery ==
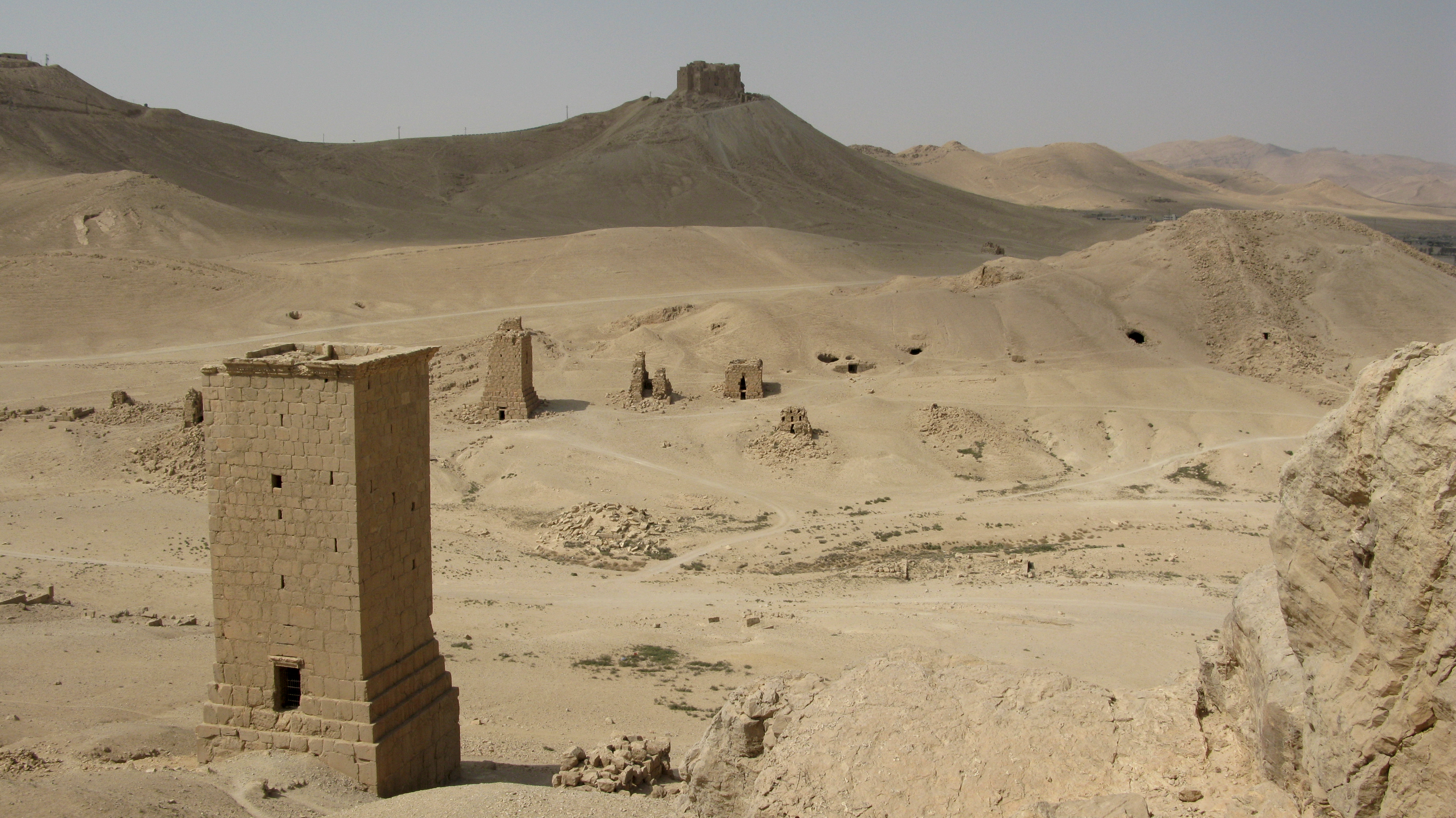
Panoramic view

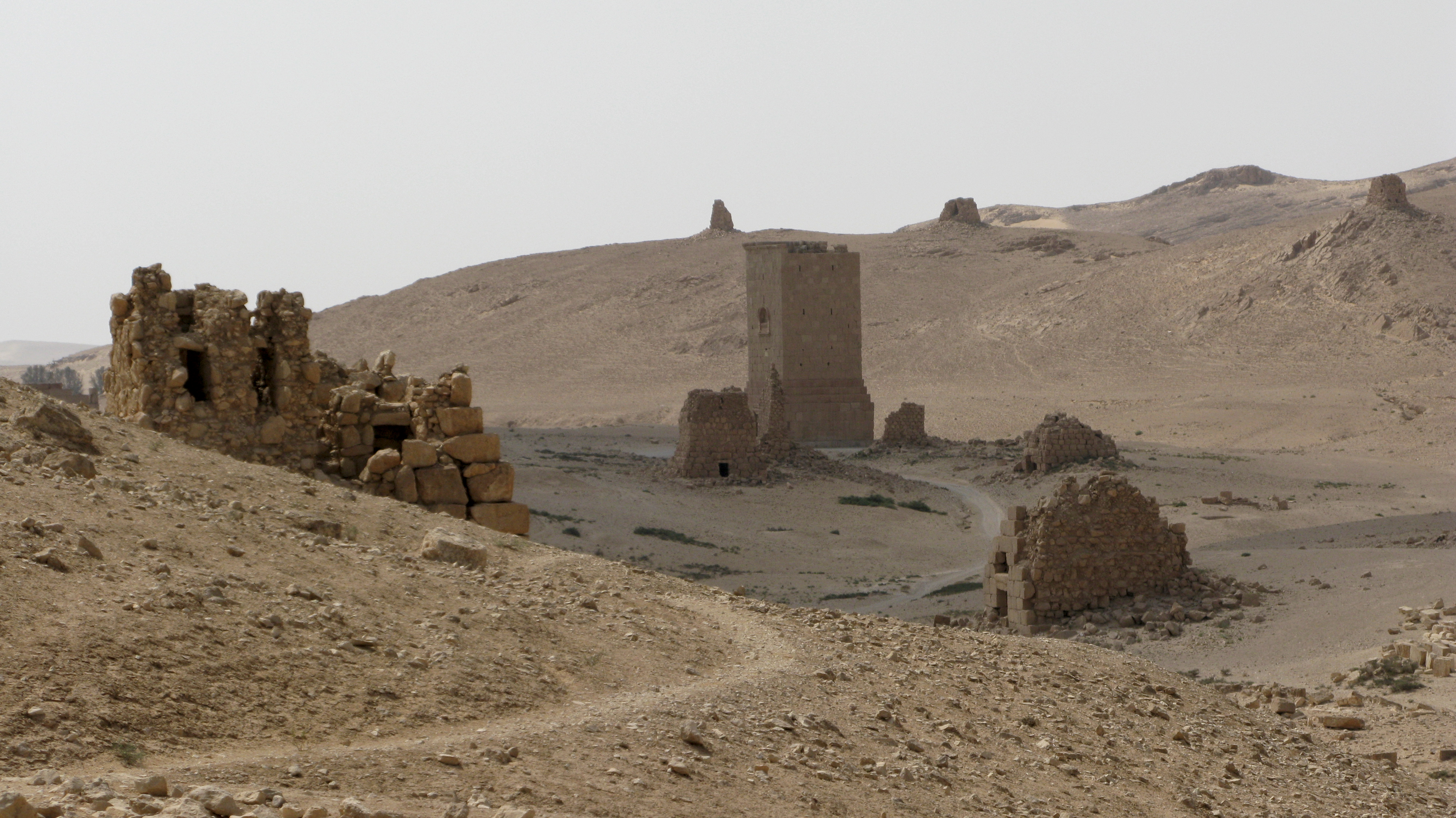
Panoramic view

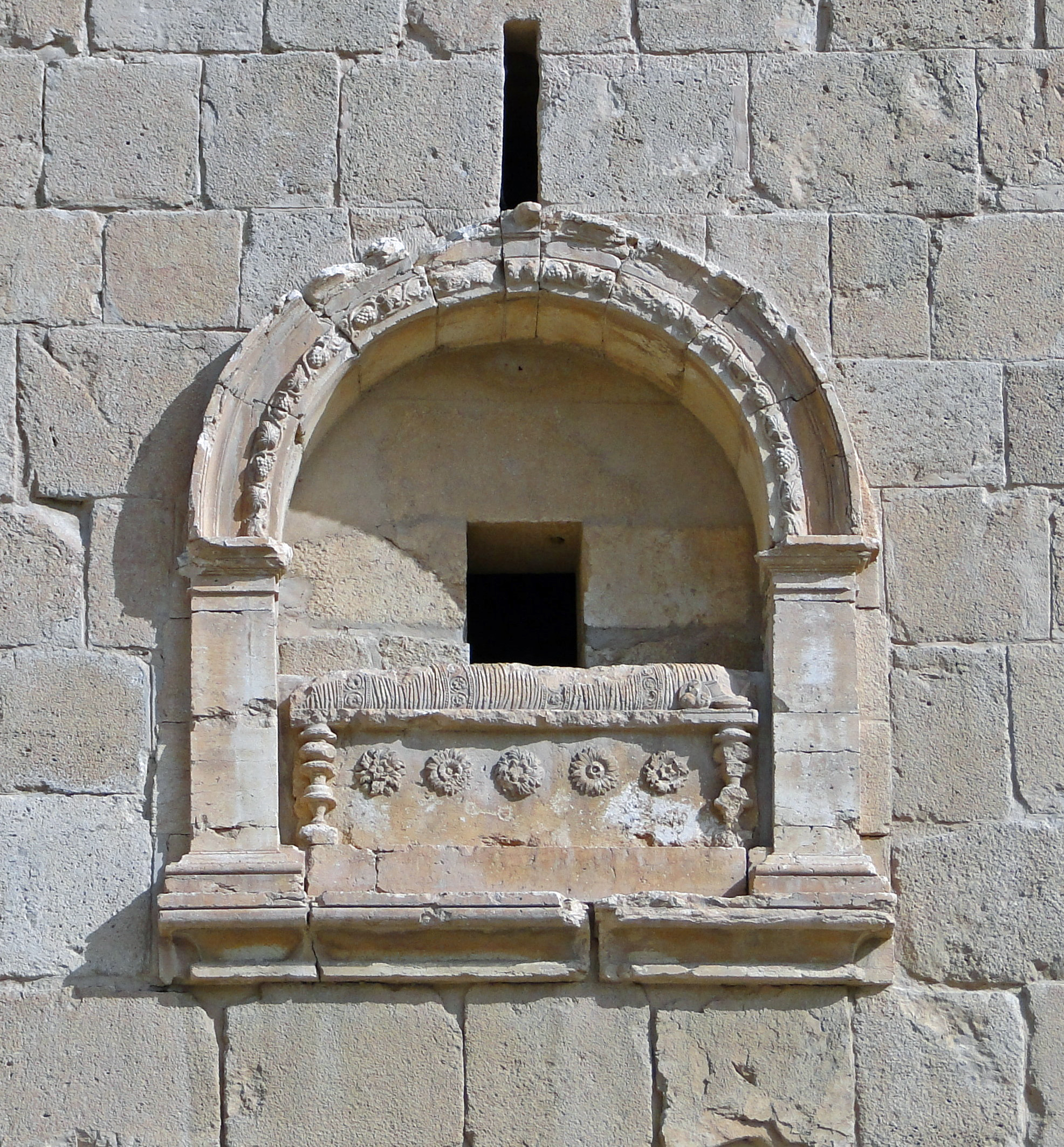
Balcony niche at the tower, in 2010

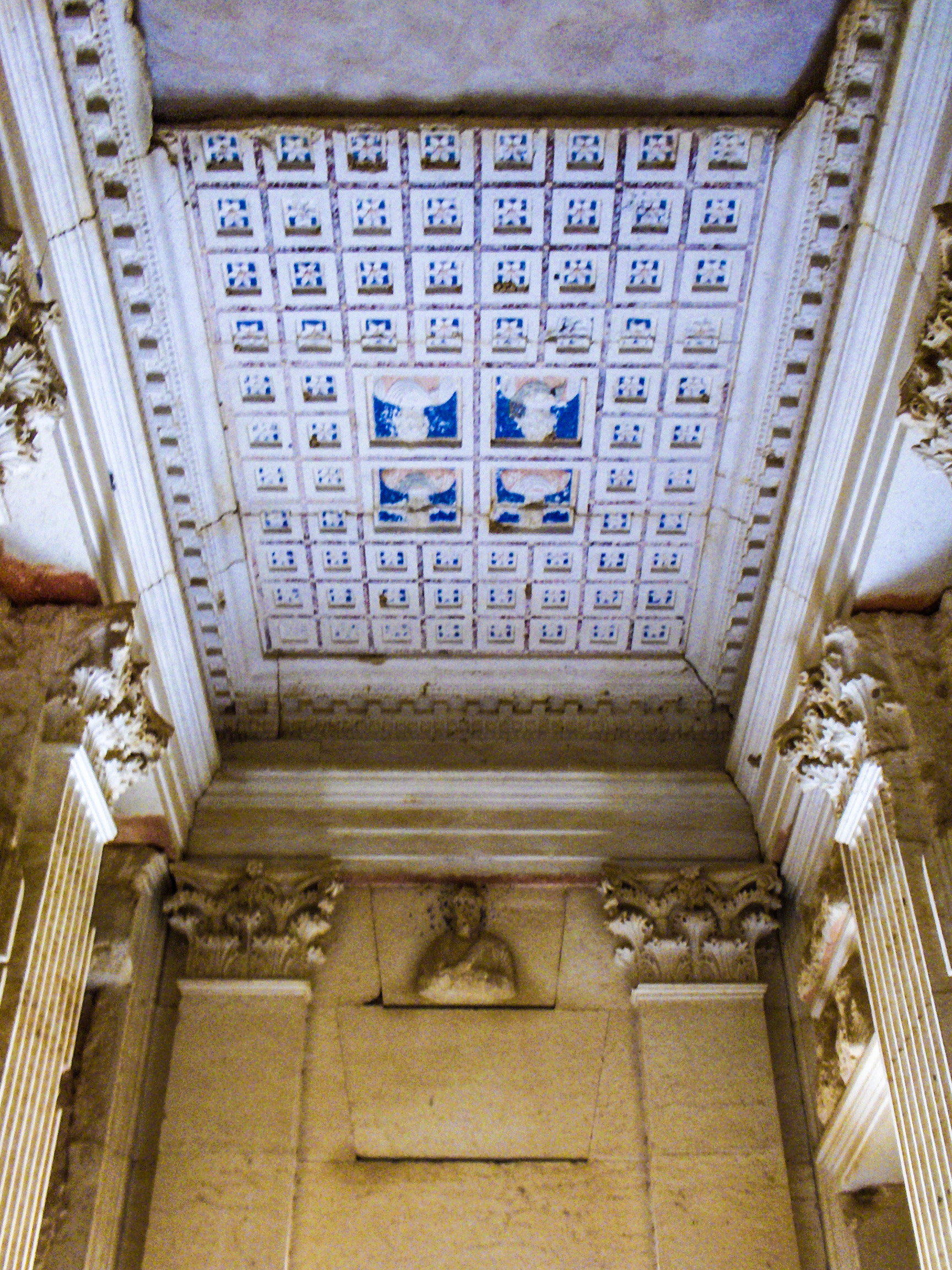
Interior of the tower, in 2010

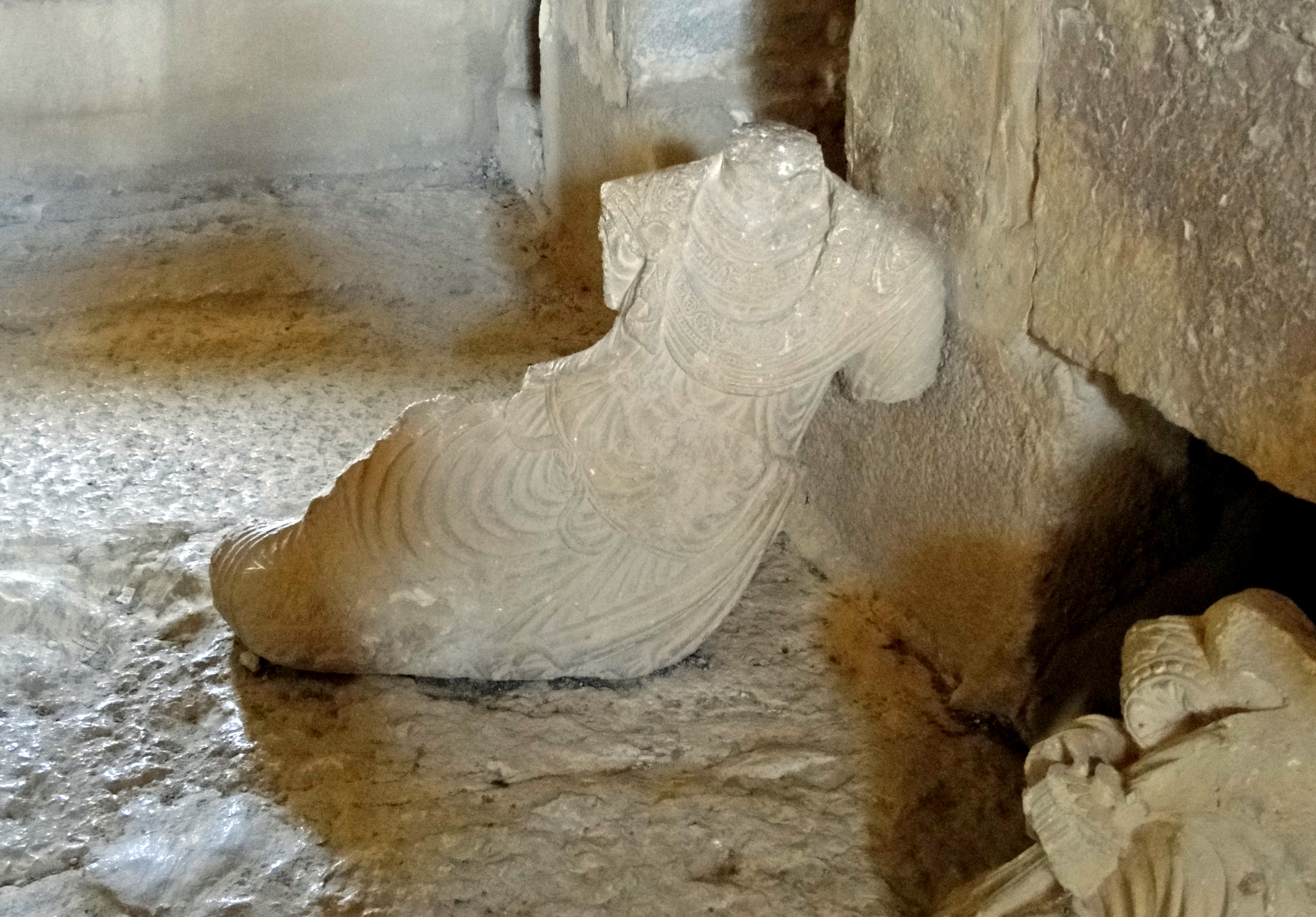
Statue in the tower, in 2010

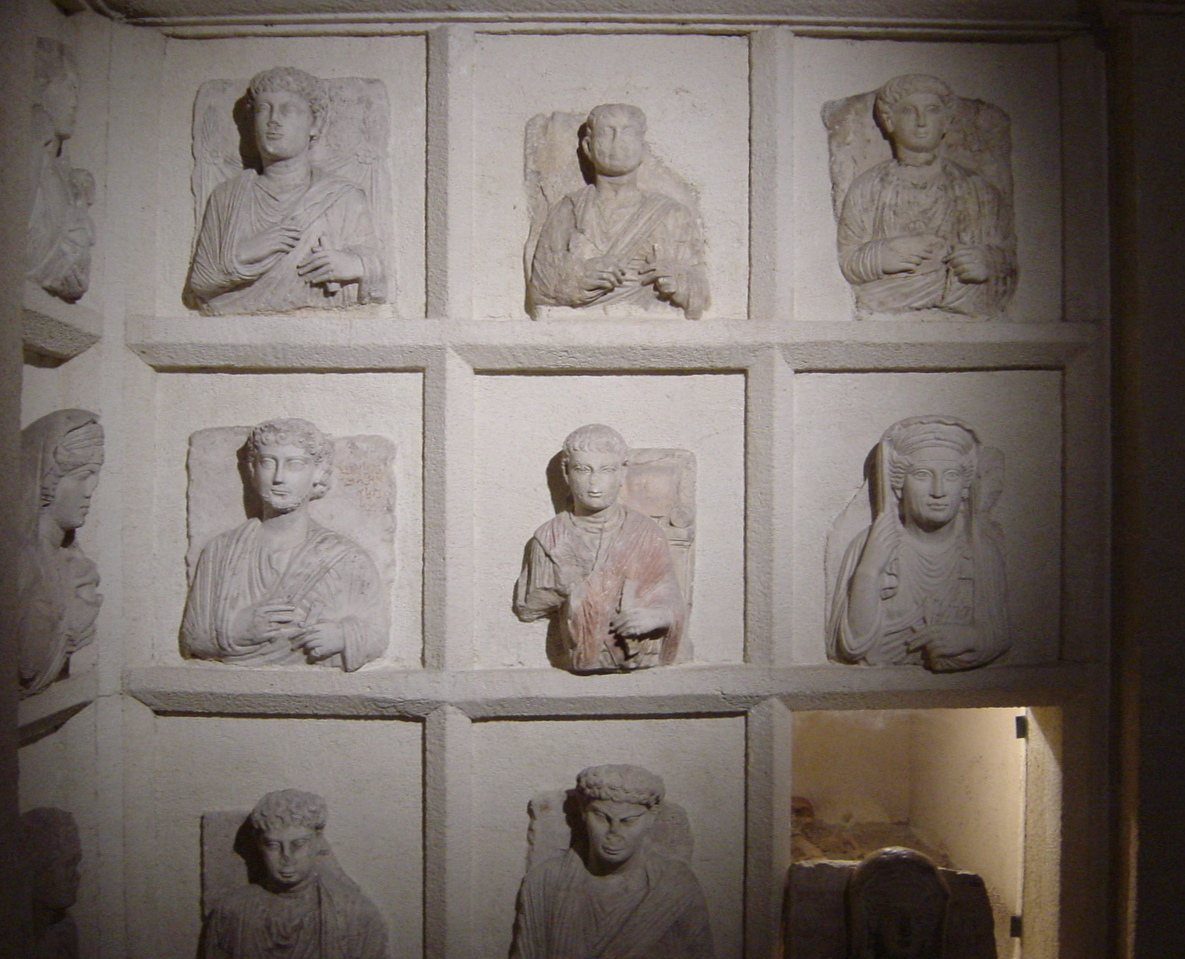
Examples of Palmyrene loculi (from the Istanbul Archaeological Museum)

== See also ==
- Pillar tomb

== Sources ==
- Roman Palmyra: Identity, Community, and State Formation, Andrew M. Smith II, p. 93-95
- Palmyra, Tower Tomb of Elahbel
- Rome in the East: The Transformation of an Empire, Warwick Ball, p. 366
