= Statonia =

Ancient Etruscan city

- Statonia
- Type: Ancient city
- Cultures: Etruscan
- Region: Etruria

History
- Built: Unknown (Etruscan period)
- Abandoned: Roman era

Site notes
- Condition: Lost city (location disputed)

Statonia was an ancient Etruscan city whose location is unknown and disputed.

Directly cite by George Dennis, The Cities and Cemeteries of Etruria vol I pag. 467 ss. Chapter XXIV STATONIA:

"... If not on this site (CASTRO), where shall we place the ancient Statonia? it is a question not to be answered definitely. Pliny indeed indicates a site not far from the sea (8: Plin. XIV, 8, 5. He records the renown of its wine.), though not actually on the coast (9: Plin. III 8; cf. Strab. V. p. 226). From his and other notices of it in connection with Tarquinii, it seems highly probable that it stood close to, if not actually within the territory of that city, as Vitruvius appears to intimate (1: Vitruv. II, 7; Plin. XXXVI. 49; Varro, de Re Rust. III. 12. The lastnamed writer says there were immense preserves of hares, stags and wild sheep, in the ager of Statonia. Cluver thinks that Statonia could not have stood in the direct line between Tarquinii and the lake of Volsinii, because the ager Tarquiniensis extended up to that lake. Dempster offers no opinion on his own.). There is every reason to believe that Statonia stood somewhere in this northern district of the Etruscan plain, but to which of the ancient sites in this quarter, of undetermined name, to assign it, we have yet no means of deciding. Four or five miles west of Ischia lies Valentano, on a hill of black ashes, part of the lip of the great crater-lake of Bolsena. It is a larger than ischia or Farnese, but can offer no better accommodation to the traveller. From a terrace outside the walls a magnificent view of the lake is to be had, but I saw it in lowering weather, when the clouds lay like a gray pall on its waters, and only when they occasionally broke could I catch a glimpse of its broad, leaden surface, with its two islets of fabulous renown, and the headland of Capo di Monte appearing like a third. This town is supposed by Cluver to be the representative of Verentum, a place of which no express mention is made, but which he conjectures to have existed, from the persuasion of a corruption in the text of Pliny. But I cannot think he has adequate ground for this opinion (2: Cluver II. p. 516. He thinks that in Pliny's catalogue of Roman colonies in Etruria (III, 8), the "Veientani" of the ordinary version should be "Verentani", as some readings have it, both because it comes next in the list to Vesentini- Vesentum being the island Bisentino, in the lake of Bolsena - and because Veii had ceased to exist before pliny's time. But it must venture here to differ entirely from Cluver: Pliny's list is clearly alphabetical, and has no reference to toppographical relations; and Veii, a century before Pliny's day, had been recolonised by the Romans, and was then existing as a municipium. The balance is also greatly in favour of "Veientani", inasmuch as Pliny in his catalogue would surely not omit all mention of that colony, which was the nearest of all, almost within sight of the Seven Hills, and whose past history was so intimately interwoven with that of rome. if this be the correct reading, there is no proof of the existence of such a town as Verentum. Cramer, I pag. 223, follows Cluver's opinion). I perceived no traces of ancient habitation on this site, Etruscan or Roman, not could I learn that such exist. The walls are wholly mediaeval, and tombs there are none;in ttrth, the volcanic ashes and scoriae of which the hill is composed would render it impraticable to construct tombs here in the usual manner of the Etruscans. From Valentano there is a track, a mere bridle-path, to pitigliano, within the Tuscan frontier, about twelve miles distant. About midway it passes the lake of Mezzano, a small piece of water embosomed among wooded hills, which is pronounced by Cluver to be the Laces Statoniensis (Cluver II, p. 517. He speacks of it as undoubted - haud dubium est. Mannert and Cramer agree with him). That lake, however, is said by pliny and Seneca to have contained an island, which this of Mezzano does not, so that we must either reject Cluver's conclusion, or suppose that the island has since disappeared (4 plin. II, 96; Seneca, Nat. Qauest. II, 25. there are only four other lakes in Etruria which contain, or are said to have contained, islands - the Thrasymene, and lcus Prilis or Prelius. The first two are mentioned by pliny, and the second by Seneca, in addition to the Lake of Statonia, so that it cannot be confounded with them. Th Thrasymene is too much inland, secing that Statonia was not far from the coast. And of Lacus Prilis, now Lago Castiglione, may be said, what will be apply with equal force to the Thrasymene, that it is much too remote from Tarquinii; for Statonia, as already shown, was either close to or within the ager of that city.), and to have become eventually attached to the shores of the lake. Such seems to have been the case with Vadimonian lake, which is now almost choked by the encroachment of its banks on the water; and a similar process is going forward in the Lacus Cutiliae, in Sabina, and in the Sulphureous lakes below Tivoli; where masses of vegetables matter, floating on the water, assume the appearance of islands, and having had their cruise awhile, become entangled at length by some prominent rock or tree on the shore, attach themselves permanently to it, and settle down into respectable portions of terra firma.

== Sources ==
- George Dennis, The Cities and Cemeteries of Etruria vol I pag. 467 ss. Chapter XXIV STATONIA
- Mazzolai, Aldo (1997). Guida della Maremma. Percorsi tra arte e natura. Florence: Le Lettere.
- Citter, Carlo (2002). Guida agli edifici sacri della Maremma. Siena: Nuova Immagine Editrice.
