= Valley of the Tombs =

Ancient necropolis

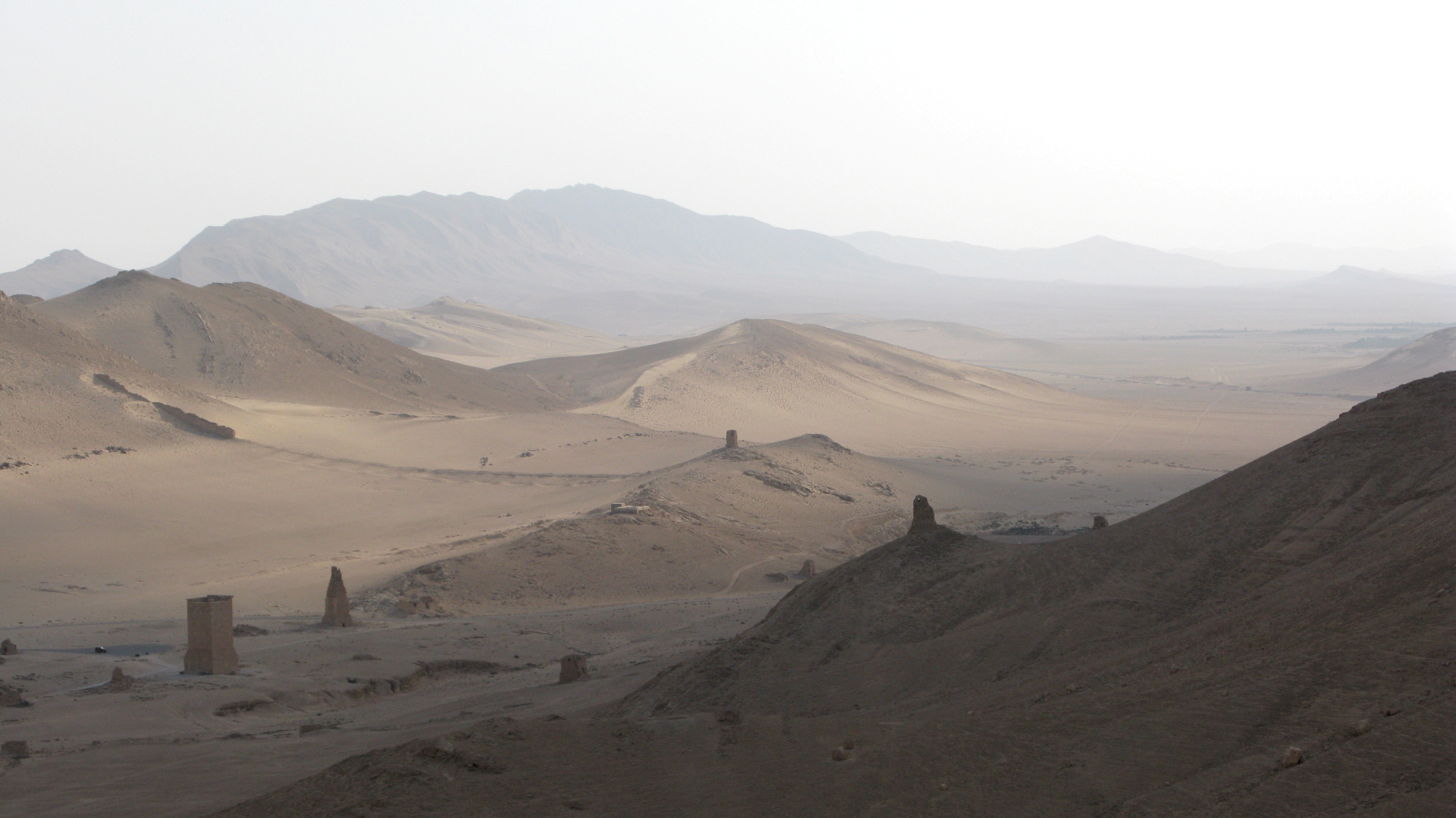
- The Valley of the Tombs in 2008
- Interactive map of Valley of the Tombs
- 34.552418°N 38.257141°E
- Location: Palmyra, Syria

The Valley of the Tombs (Arabic: وادي القبور, romanized: Wādī al-Qubūr) is a necropolis at the west of Palmyra, Syria. It is one of the three necropoleis present around the ancient city. It is one kilometre long (0.62 mi), and easily recognizable by its tower-tombs, among which the former towers of Atenatan, Kitot, Iamblichus and Elahbel where the earliest finds of silk were made and that were destroyed by ISIS in 2015.

== Tower-tombs ==
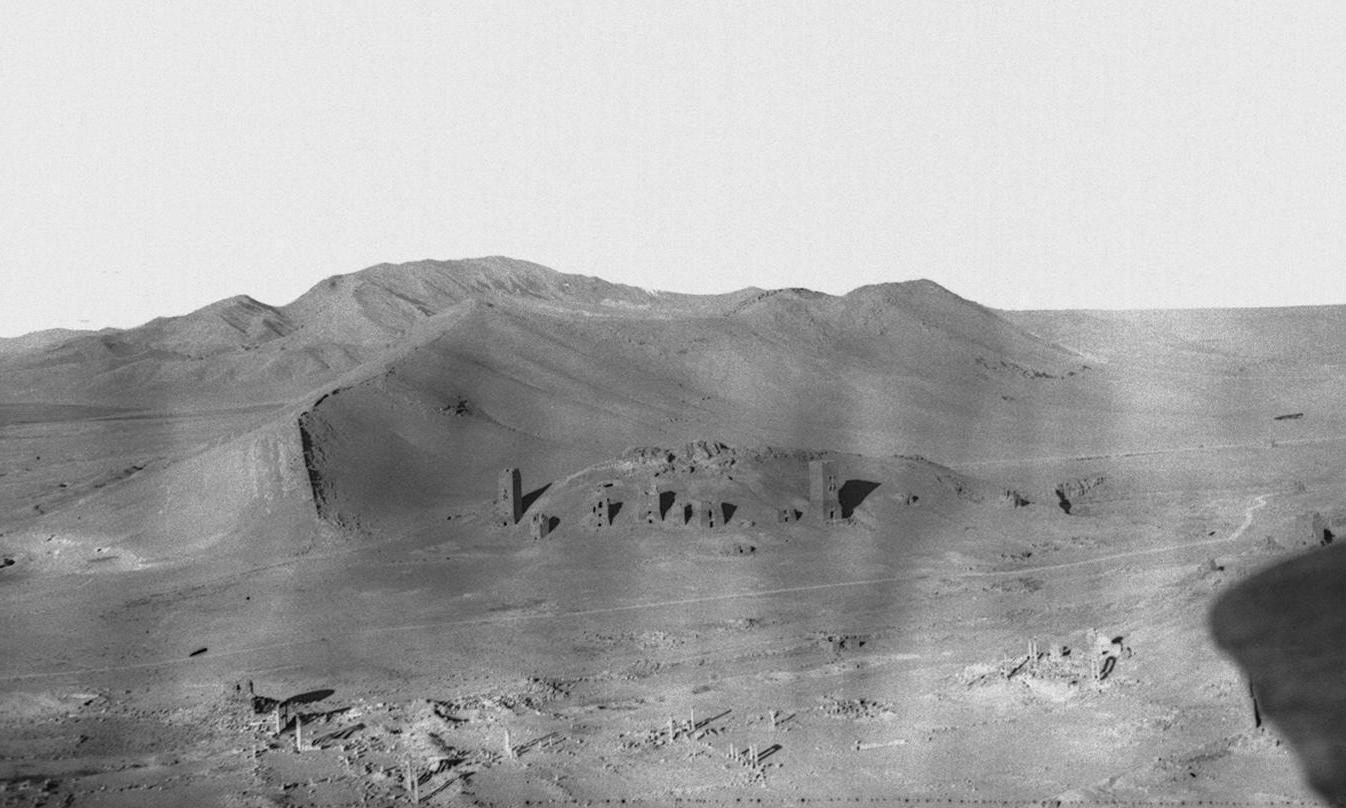
Aerial view in 1927

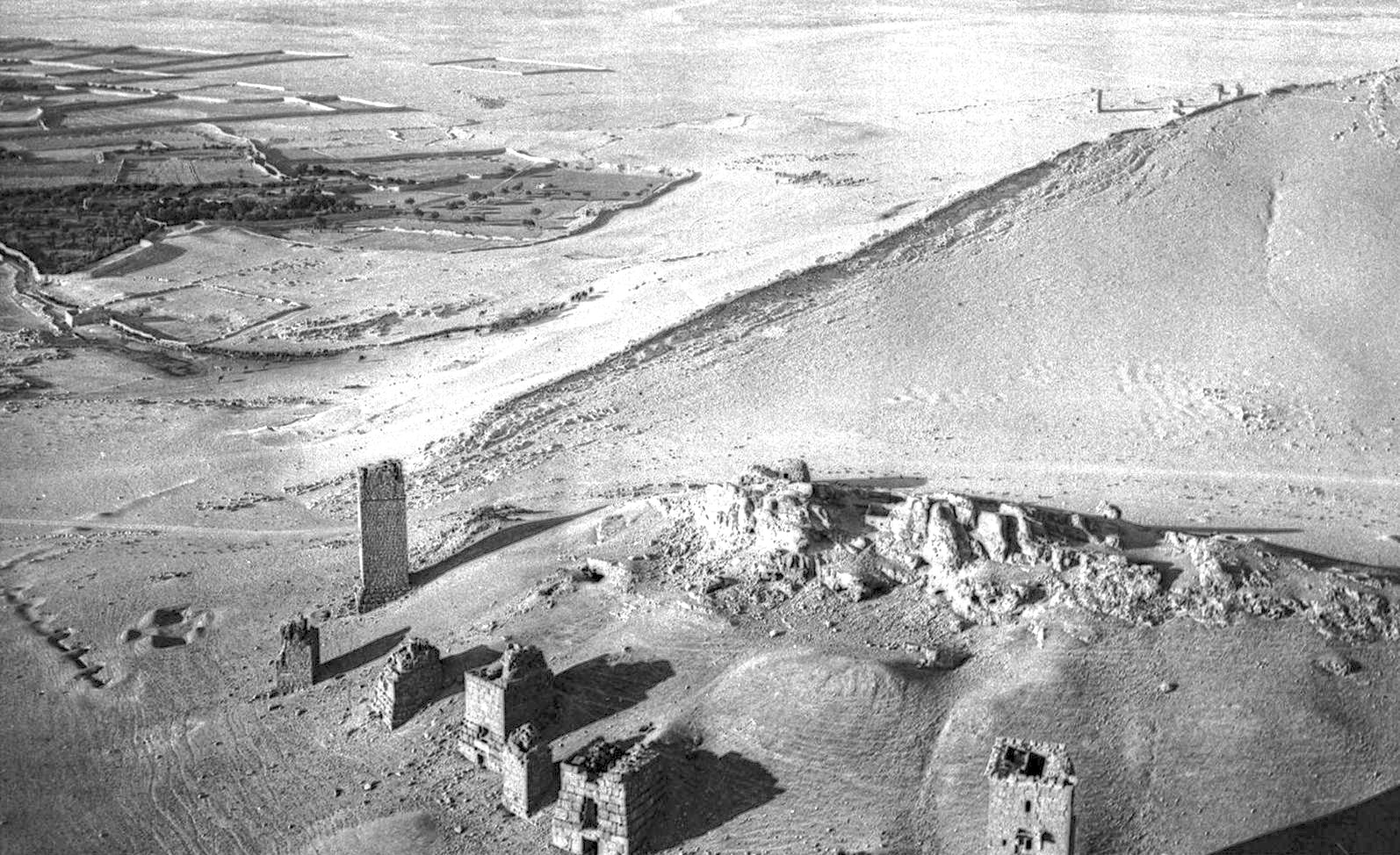
Close-up view of towers in 1927

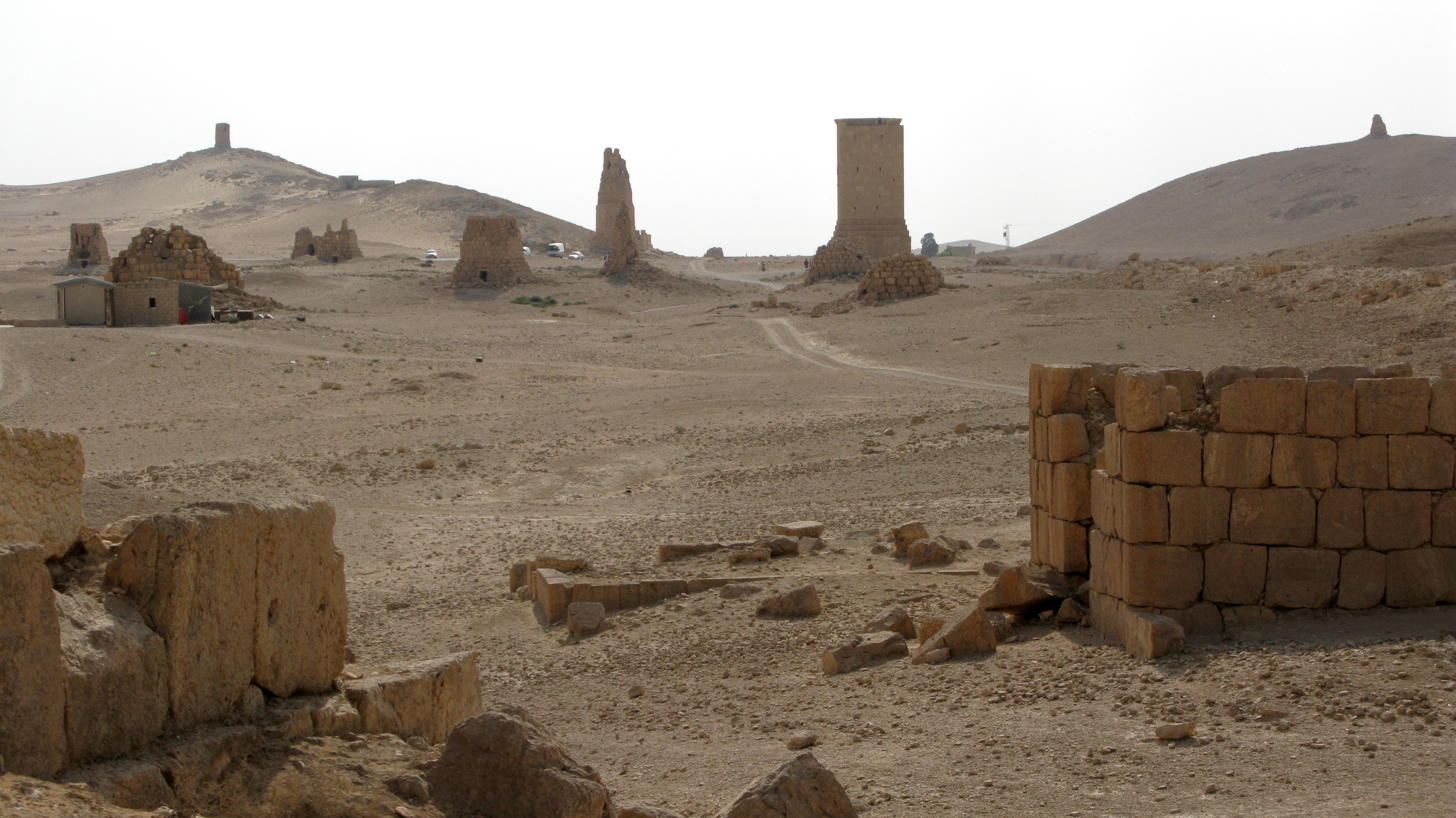
Close-up view of towers in 2008

=== Tower of Atenatan ===
As worded by Anna Witecka, "The tower-tomb of Atenatan is the earliest dated tomb in the Palmyrene necropolis. The date of the tower, established by an inscription, is 9 B.C. and the date of the fall of Palmyra in 273 A.D. must be accepted as the terminus ante quem. Built of irregular stones, the tower is quadrangular and narrows toward the top." As described by J. M. C. Toynbee, the tomb "has a facade of limestone blocks and a panelled stone door, composed of two wings that turn on pivots, above which is the slab for a bilingual Greek and Palmyrene (Araméenne) inscription."

=== Tower of Kitot ===
The Tower of Kitot dated from 40 AD.

=== Tower of Iamblichus ===
The Tomb of Iamblichus dated to AD 81 It is about 58 feet high.

== See also ==
- Hypogeum of Yarhai

== Sources ==
- Henning, Agnes (2013). "The Tower Tombs of Palmyra: Chronology, Architecture and Decoration". Studia Palmyreńskie.
- Toynbee, Jocelyn (1996). Death and burial in the Roman World. Baltimore: Johns Hopkins University Press. ISBN 0-8018-5507-1. OCLC 35049546.
- Beattie, Andrew; Pepper, Timothy (2001). The Rough Guide to Syria. Rough Guides. ISBN 978-1-85828-718-8.
