= Necropolis of Monte Luna =

Ancient site in Sardinia

The Necropolis of Monte Luna is an archaeological site located in the surroundings of Senorbì, in Sardinia, near a hill known as Monte Luna (Italian: Moon Mountain). Excavations at this site have unveiled the remainders of a Carthaginian necropolis, comprising about 120 graves. The necropolis was built by the inhabitants of a Carthaginian settlement in the area of modern Santu Teru around the 6th century BC.
