= Cesano (RM) =

- Zona of Rome
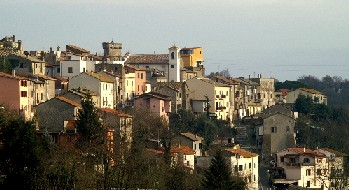
- The village of Cesano

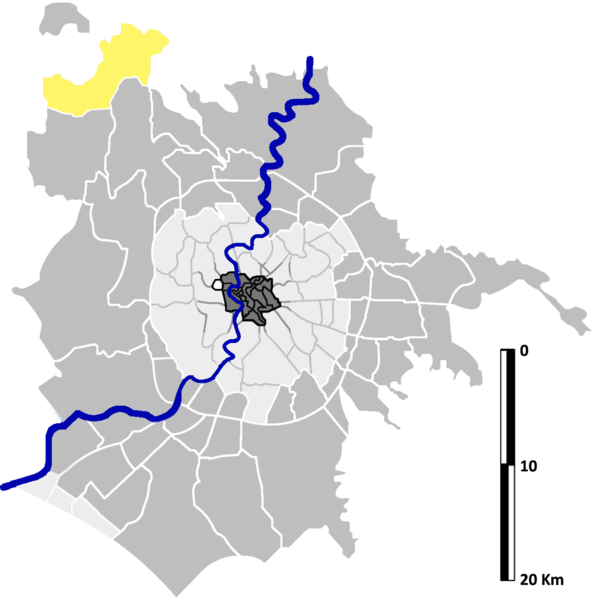
- Position of the zona within the city
- Country: Italy
- Region: Lazio
- Province: Rome
- Comune: Rome

Area
  - Total: 14.6708 sq mi (37.9973 km^{2})

Population (2016)
  - Total: 10,853
  - Density: 739.8/sq mi (285.63/km^{2})
- Time zone: UTC+1 (CET)
  - Summer (DST): UTC+2 (CEST)

Cesano is the 52nd zona of Rome, Italy, identified by the initials Z. LII. It takes its name from the small medieval village of Cesano di Roma, on the Via Cassia, which is located within the Municipio XV, 27 km from Rome proper.

== History ==
The village of Cesano occupies a 240 m hill surrounded by the Monti Sabatini, near the Lakes of Bracciano and Martignano and near the now dried Lakes Stracciacappa and Baccano. It was a frazione of Campagnano di Roma until 1923, when at the request of the locals it was annexed to Rome (R.D. 3247 of December 23, 1923).

The most relevant holy day is the Holy Crucifix procession, which is held every September 14 since 1508.

Cesano is home to the Infantry School of the Italian Army and of the Casaccia Research Center of ENEA.

== Geography ==
The zone is in the northern part of the municipality of Rome, in the Agro Romano. A large portion of it falls under the Regional Natural Park of Bracciano-Martignano and shares the eastern border with the Regional Park of Veii.

The zone is near to the ancient towns of Galeria and Veii and to the ancient Via Clodia.

=== Boundaries ===
The zone borders, to the north, with the municipality of Campagnano di Roma; to the north-west, it also borders with the municipality of Anguillara Sabazia.

Eastward, Cesano shares a border with the municipality of Formello.

To the south, the zone borders with Zona La Storta (Z. LI), from which is separated by the Rio Galeria and by Via di Baccanello, up to Via Cassia. Southward, the zone also borders with Zona Santa Maria di Galeria (Z. XLIX), from which is separated by the stretch of Via Braccianese between the Rio Galeria and the Fosso Pietroso.

=== Odonymy ===
While odonyms of the old village refer to local history, surrounding streets and squares are generally named after valorous partisans, war heroes and recipients of the Gold Medal of Military Valour. In the locality of Colle Due Pini, streets are dedicated to cardinals and clergymen, while in the locality of Osteria Nuova streets are named after towns of Veneto and prominent publishers. Odonyms of the zone can be categorized as follows:

- Cardinals, e.g. Via Ildebrando Antoniutti, Via Angelo Maria Durini, Via Landolfo da Carcano, Via Lanfranco di Pavia, Via Giacomo Lanfredini Amadori;
- Local toponyms, e.g. Via di Baccanello, Via Campiscari, Via Castanea Cupa, Via Cortiliano, Via di Femmina Morta, Via della Fontana Morta, Via della Fontana Secca, Via Furcule, Via della Merluzza, Via di Monte Sant'Andrea, Piazza Padella, Via Ponte degli Incastri, Via di Ponte Trave, Via di Prato Corazza, Borgo di Sopra, Borgo di Sotto, Via della Stazione di Cesano;
- Partisans, war heroes and recipients of the Gold Medal of Military Valour, e.g. Via Giuseppe Avenati, Via Pietro Bellino, Via Michele Ferraiolo, Via Dario Grixoni, Via Giovanni Palatucci, Largo Aldo Pastorini, Via Pradis Pedaggi, Via Dario Pirlone, Via Ferruccio Pizzigoni, Via Fulvia Ripa di Meana;
- Publishers, e.g. Via Gaspero Barbera, Via Edoardo Sonzogno, Via Carlo Voghera, Via Nicola Zanichelli;
- Towns of Veneto, e.g. Via Albignasego, Via Arquà Petrarca, Via Borgoricco, Via Campodarsego, Via Codevigo, Via Conselve, Via Fanzolo, Via Lamon, Via Quero, Via Sovramonte, Via Zoldo Alto.

== Places of interest ==
=== Civil buildings ===
- Borgo della Merluzza, in Via della Merluzza. A 17th-century farmstead. 42.083157°N 12.372998°E

It includes a chapel and a 13th-century tower which was annexed to the farmhouse.

- Torraccia del Bosco, in Via Cassia. A medieval tower. 42.090601°N 12.375758°E
- Monumental arch of the Acquedotto Paolino in the Olgiata estate. A 17th-century arch crossing the Fosso di Cesano. 42.053607°N 12.338515°E

=== Religious buildings ===
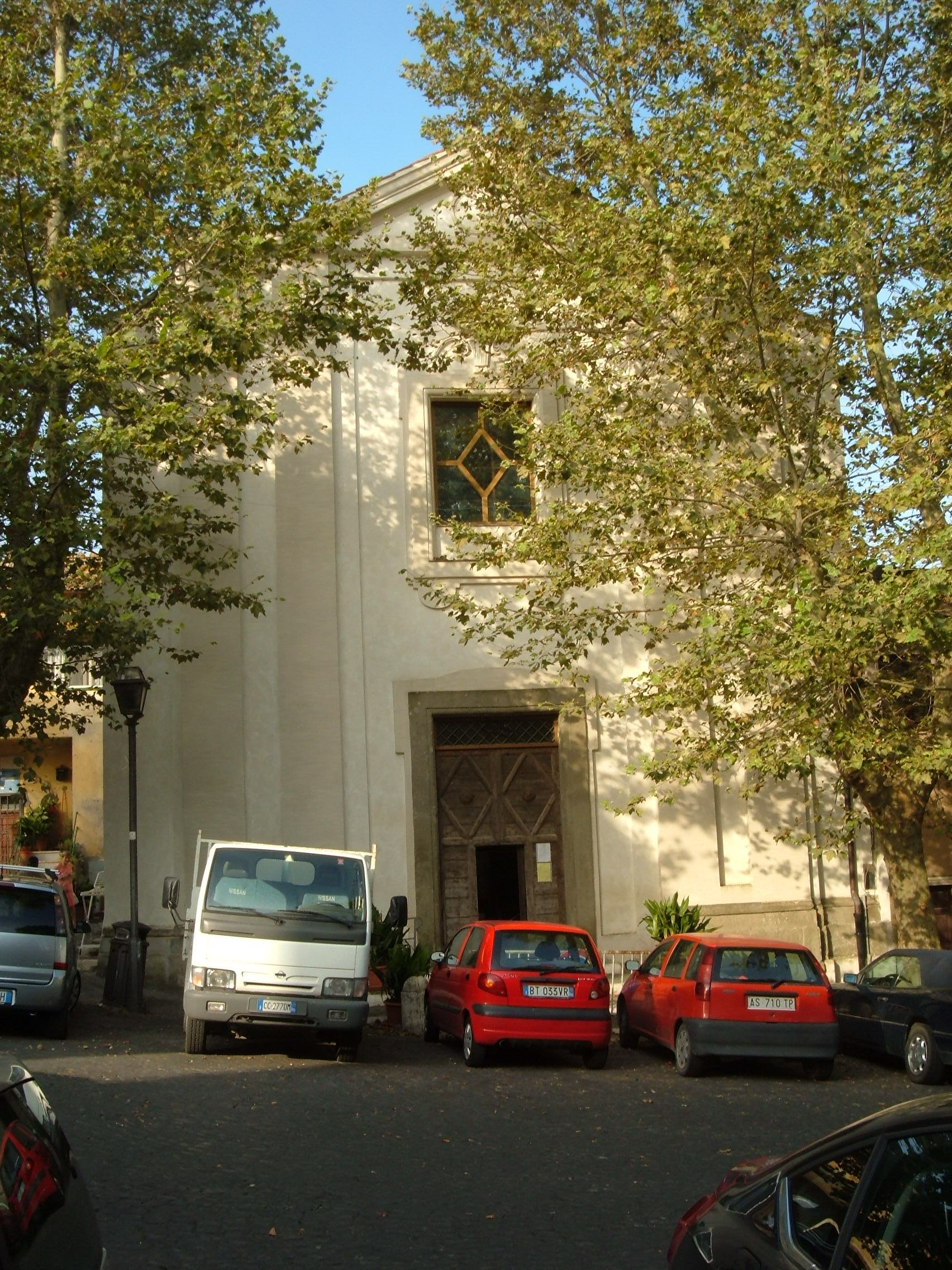
The church of San Giovanni Battista

- San Nicola di Bari, in Borgo di Sopra. 11th-century church.
- San Giovanni Battista, in Piazza Francesco Caraffa. 17th-century church. 42.081550°N 12.350731°E
- San Sebastiano Martire, in Via della Stazione di Cesano. 20th-century church. 42.066645°N 12.332537°E
- Chapel of San Martino, in Via della Stazione di Cesano. A 20th-century chapel, it is located within the Infantry School. 42.068932°N 12.330085°E
- Sant'Andrea Apostolo, in Via Lamon. 20th-century church. 42.036650°N 12.305562°E

=== Natural areas ===
- Lake Martignano
- Regional Park of Veii

== Transportations ==
It is connected to Rome by the FR3 railway.

== See also ==
- Santa Maria di Galeria
- Cesanese Comune
- Administrative subdivision of Rome
