= Norchia =

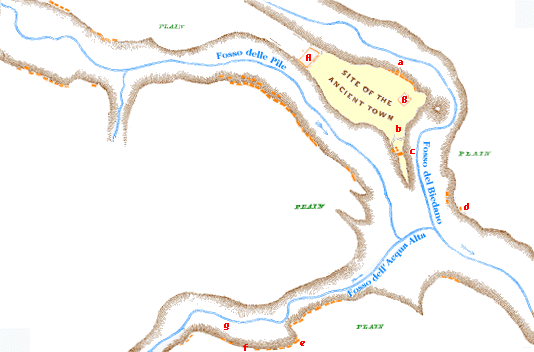
- Plan of Norchia and its necropolis

- Location within Lazio
- 42°20′20″N 11°56′45″E
- Cultures: Etruscan
- Location: Comune di Vetralla, Lazio Italy
- Region: Lazio

Site notes
- Excavation dates: yes

Norchia is an ancient Etruscan city with an adjacent necropolis, near Vetralla in Italy. The site is along the Via Clodia, and is not far from the more well known Etruscan town of Tarquinia.

== History ==
The ancient name of the site is uncertain; some sources identify it with the ancient Etruscan town known as Orclae, whose name is reported in medieval sources. The locale was already inhabited in the Bronze Age, and the city and its adjoining necropolis grew with the arrival of the Etruscans. The urban settlement reached its high point between the 4th and 2nd centuries BC

The tombs are generally constructed from large blocks of tuff carved directly into the cliff, and are entered from stairs heading down into the rock. Their cliffside construction, rather than being built on the ground, makes the tombs unusual for the Etruscans. Originally bodies were placed within stone sarcophagi that may still be found in many of the tombs.

The site was later inhabited in medieval times, and remnants of a castle and church still remain. It was abandoned as a settlement in the 14th century.

== Images ==
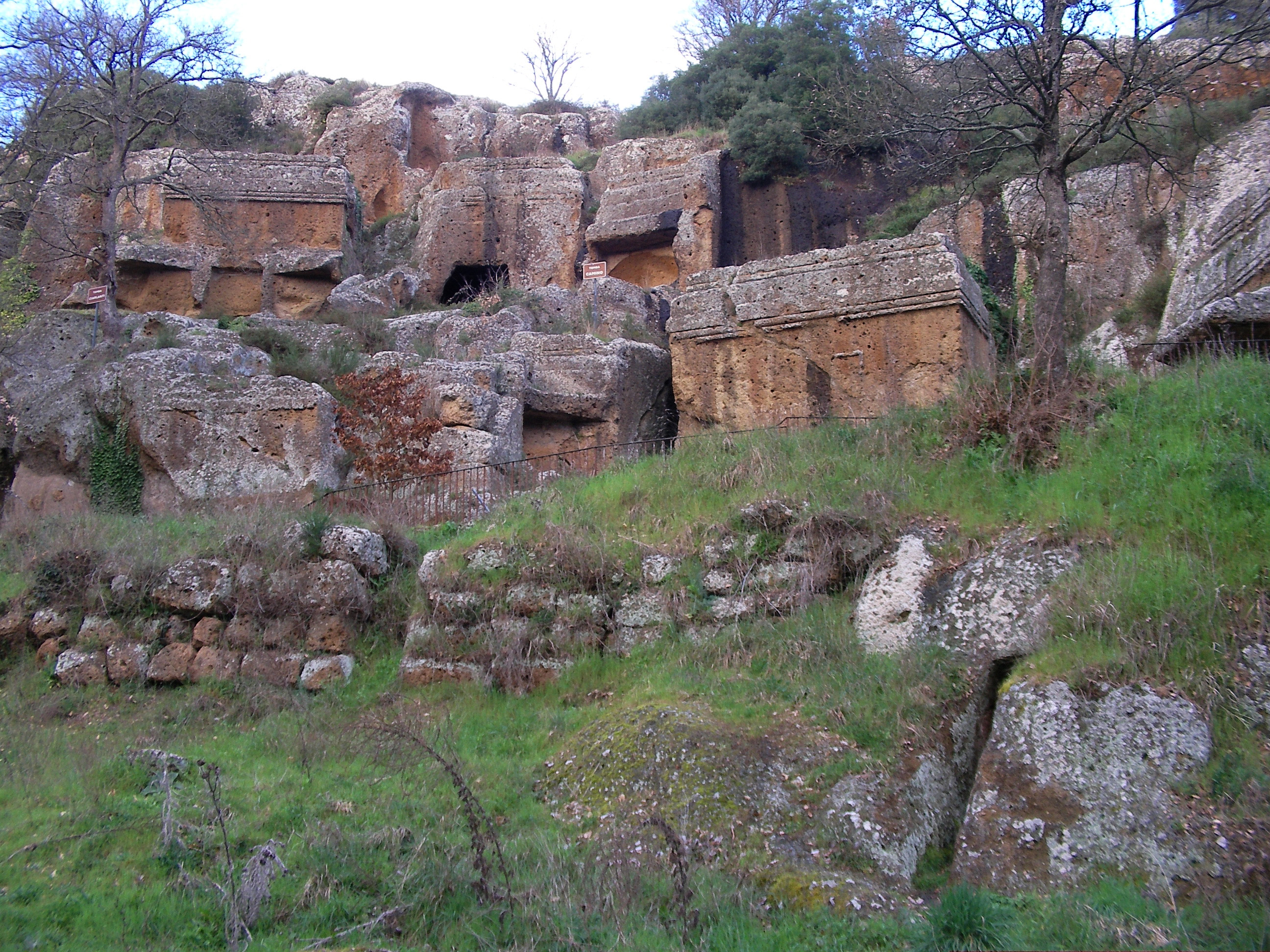

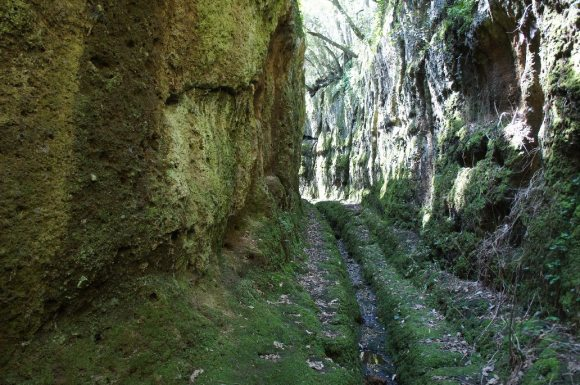

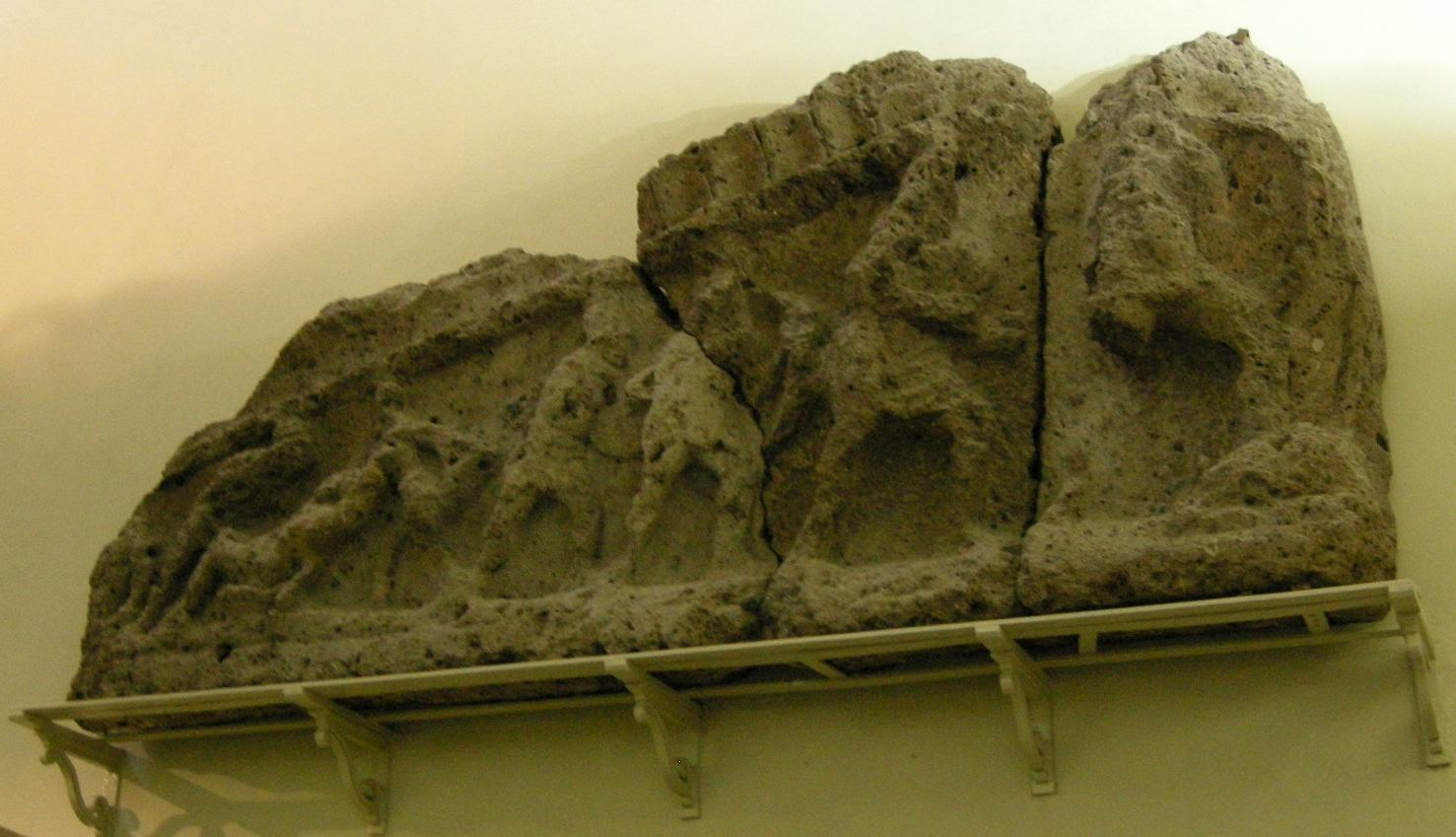

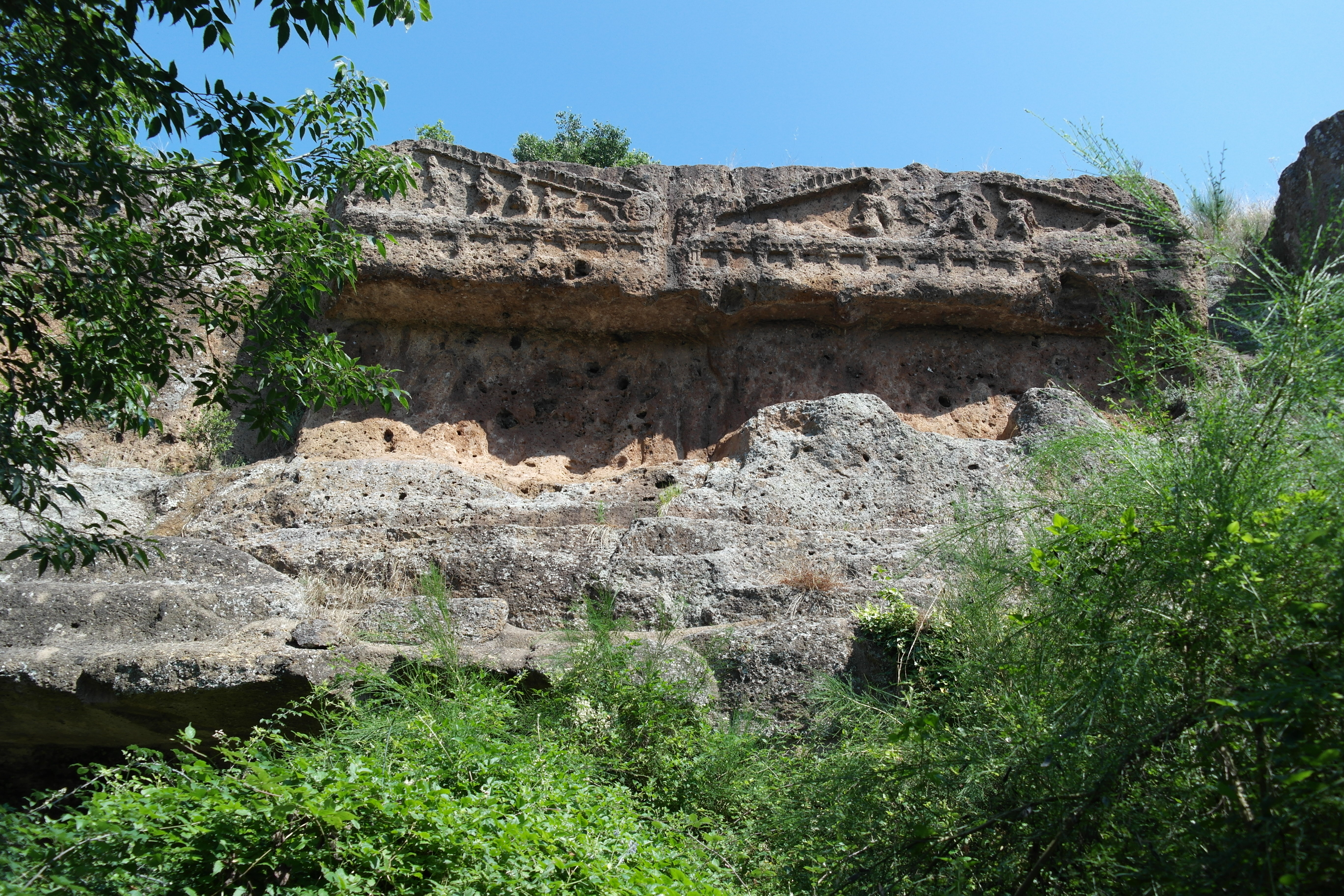
