= Careiae =

Ancient town of Etruria

Careiae (Italian: Galera) was an ancient town of Etruria, on the Via Clodia, the first station beyond Veii. The town is mentioned by Frontinus and appears in the Tabula Peutingeriana. Its site is at the abandoned village of Galera, approximately 25 km from Rome.
