= Giulia Lama =

Italian artist (1681–1747)

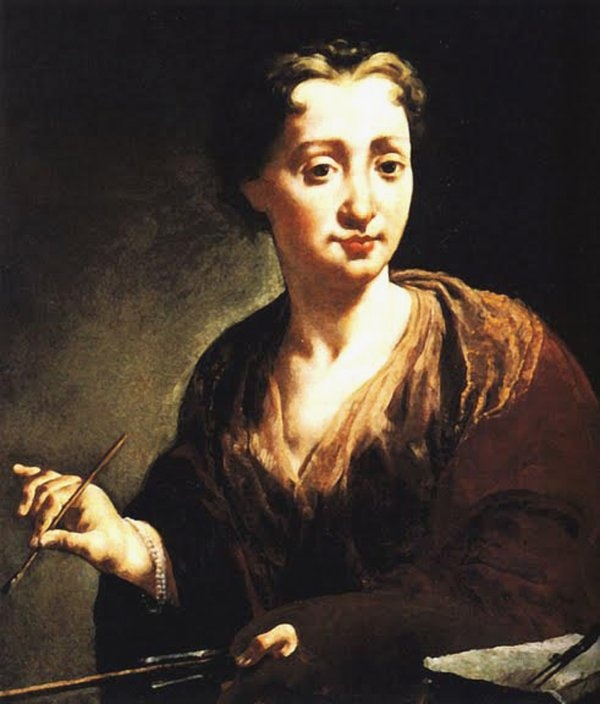
- Self-portrait of Giulia Lama
- Born: 1 October 1681; Venice, Republic of Venice
- Died: 8 October 1747 (aged 66); Venice, Republic of Venice
- Resting place: Church of Santi Giovanni e Paolo, Venice
- Known for: Painting
- Movement: Baroque

Giulia Elisabetta Lama (1 October 1681 – 8 October 1747) was an Italian painter active in Venice during the late Baroque period. Her dark, intense style contrasted with the dominant pastel tones of the era. She was one of the first female artists to study and depict the nude male figure.

== Biography ==
Giulia Lama (alias Lisalba Arcadia) was born in the parish of Santa Maria Formosa in Venice. She was the daughter of the painter Agostino Lama and Valentina dell'Avese. Lama was the eldest of three siblings: Cecilia, Niccolò, and Pietro. According to historical records, she resided at Calle Lunga 1242, between the Campo of Santa Maria Formosa and Campo SS. Giovanni e Paolo.

She was initially trained by her father and later studied alongside her childhood friend, Giambattista Piazzetta (1682–1754), at the workshop of Antonio Molinari in Venice. Their training resulted in stylistic similarities, particularly their intense use of chiaroscuro.

A letter written by Abate Conti to Madame de Caylus in March 1728 provides insight into Lama's background and character. He wrote: "The poor girl is persecuted by the painters, but her virtue triumphs over her enemies. It is true that she is as ugly as she is witty, but she speaks with grace and precision, so that one easily forgives her face."

The letter indicates that in addition to painting, Lama was skilled in mathematics, poetry, and lace making.

Lama was active as both a painter and poet in Venice. She lived at Calle Lunga 1242 for most of her life. She died on 7 or 8 October 1747, likely from the bubonic plague. Throughout her career, she successfully painted both private and public figures. Lama was among the first women to defy the conventions of her time that constrained women from studying and drawing nude figures from life. Over 200 surviving drawings confirm that she studied both male and female nude figures during her training.

Lama achieved public recognition for her work in history painting, a genre traditionally dominated by men. She demonstrated versatility in her art, creating both sensitive portraits—such as Young Man with a Turban—and large-scale commissions, including altarpieces. The identification of three such altarpieces in a Venetian guidebook from 1733 played a crucial role in reconstructing her artistic legacy. The rediscovery of Lama’s body of work has involved the reattribution of paintings previously credited to artists such as Giambattista Piazzetta, Federico Bencovich, Domenico Maggiotto, Francesco Capella, and even Francisco de Zurbarán.

== Education ==
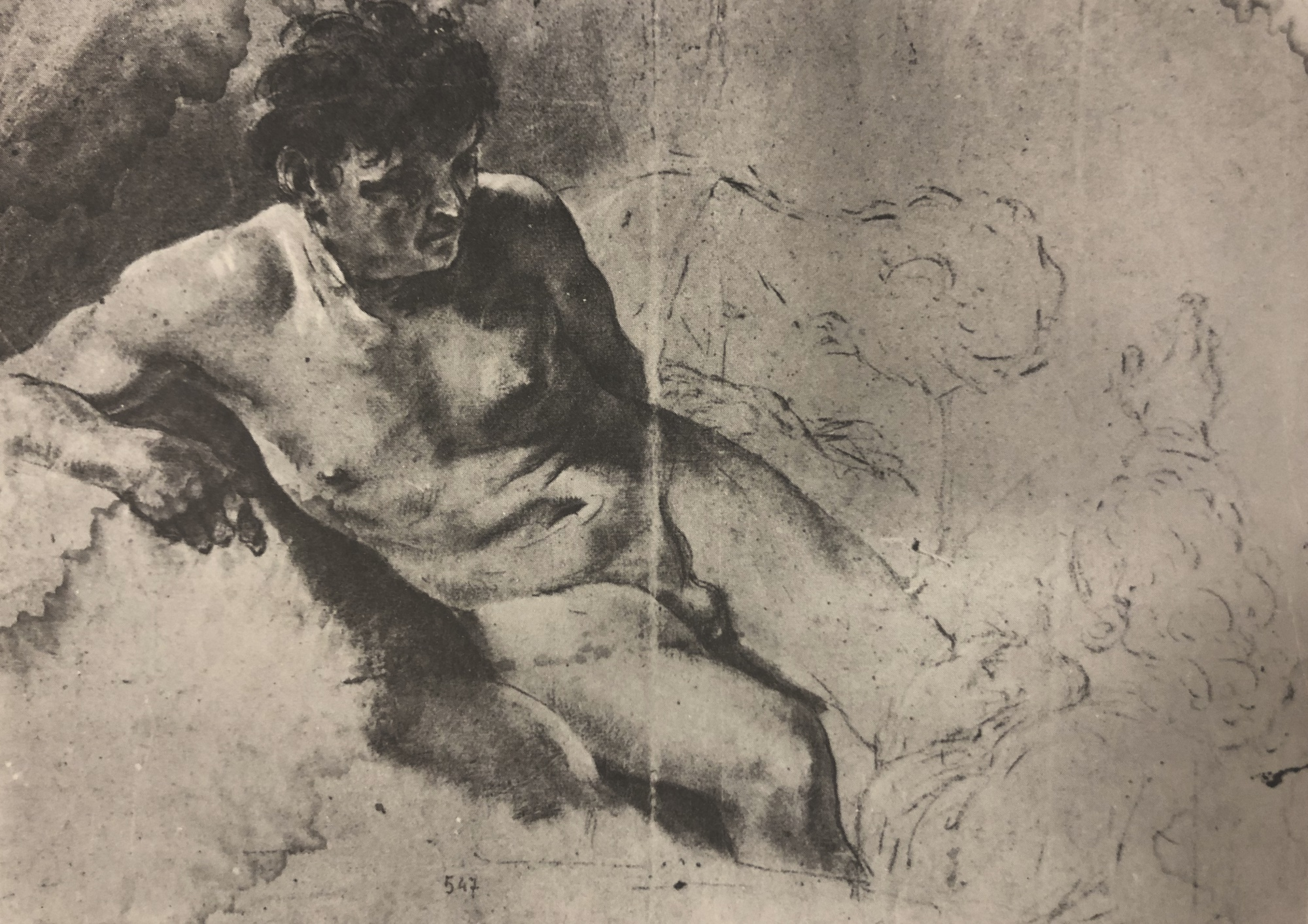
Study for Joseph Interpreting the Eunuchs' Dreams

Giulia Lama's education began early in life, with her father, Agostino Lama, training her in both mathematics and the arts. At the time, Venice discouraged women from pursuing studies in the sciences, making education in mathematics, particularly outside the home, difficult. Despite these challenges, Lama continued to pursue her intellectual interests. She began studying under Padre Maffei, a prominent mathematician of the era.

Sources suggest that Lama may have taken up lace-making as a means of financial support. Scholars have also noted her skills in embroidery. A letter from Antonio Schinella Conti to Madame de Caylus further details Lama's involvement with lace-making, stating:

Giulia makes lace and has great interest in Clelia Borromeo's apparatus for making lace by machinery, as used in making socks and cloth. I believe that it is not difficult to invent such an apparatus, and whomever [whoever] is successful would make a great deal of money and reduce the expenses for women's labor. Tell your son. Perhaps he met Lama when he was in Venice. She lives a very secluded life.

Though no official records confirm that Lama ever produced lace or a lace-making machine, it is possible that it served as a source of income. Lama never married and managed to support herself financially, which was uncommon for women during this period.

The details of Lama’s formal education following her training with her father remain somewhat unclear. However, it is suggested that she may have studied under Giuseppe Angeli. Her contemporaries included Francesco Capella, Egidio dall'Oglio, Domenico Maggiotto, and Antonio Marinetto at the Scuola di Antonio Molinari in Venice. Over 200 sketches have been found that illustrate Lama’s early studies of anatomy. One method by which Lama likely studied the male figure was by observing the workmen at the Venetian Arsenal, where she was documented to have visited frequently. It is likely that she also studied nude male models in a private studio setting.

== Career ==
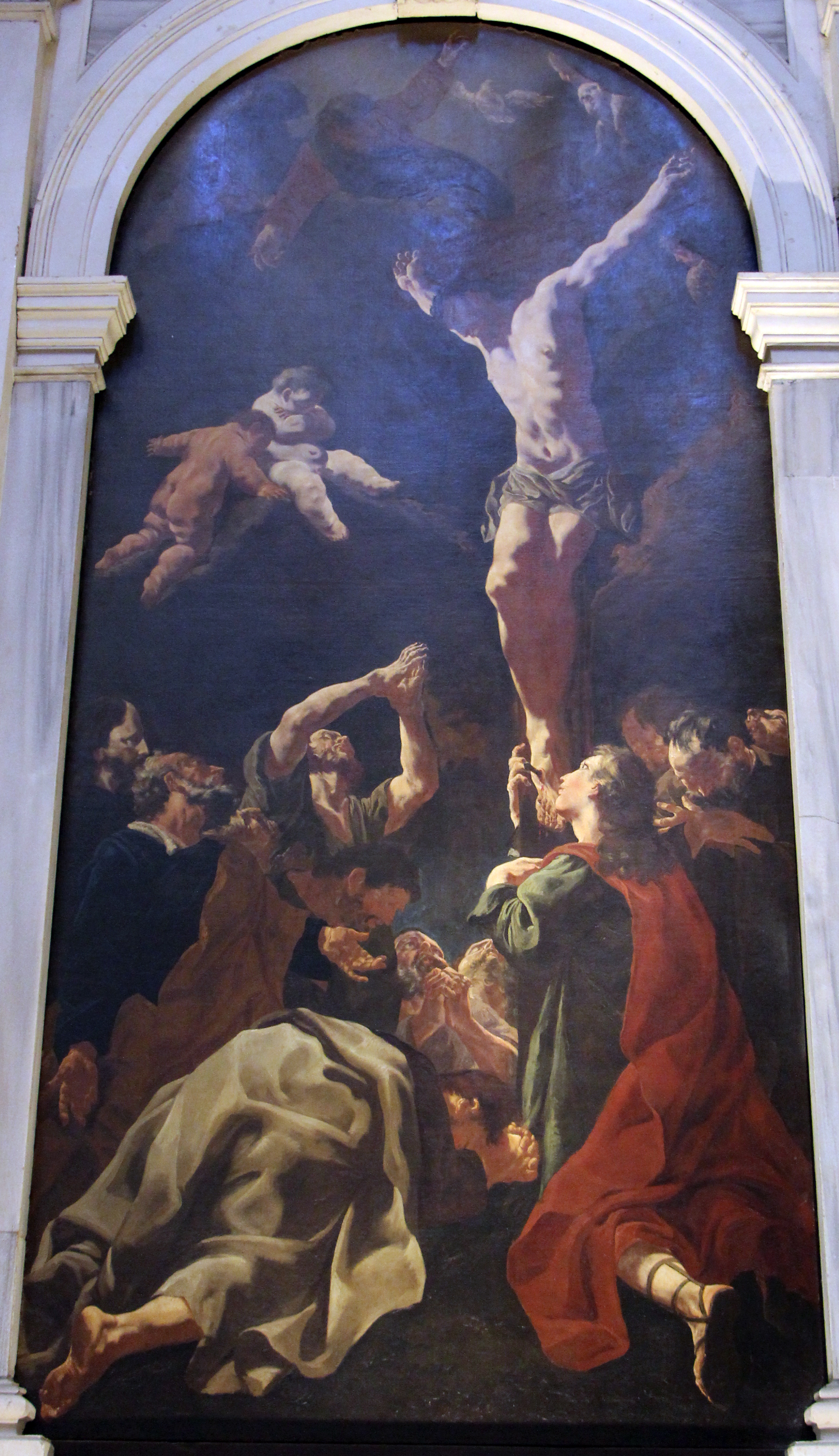
Giulia Lama, Crocifisso con gli Apostoli

Lama's career is somewhat elusive. However, it is known that her work as a painter was financially successful, and she received multiple commissions, both public and private. Two years before Abbot Conti's letter, Luisa Bergai Gozzi (1703–1779) discussed Lama's accomplishments: "...Lisalba Arcadia [Giulia Lama], most erudite in philosophy, a well-renowned painter, so much so that the main churches sought to acquire her works, particularly some altarpieces. She earned great honors for her painting style."

Lama received an important commission in 1722 to paint the altarpiece for her parish church, Santa Maria Formosa, located in the Sestiere of Castello. Another significant commission came around 1750, when she was tasked with painting a Crucifixion scene for an altar in San Vidal.

== Works ==
=== Self-portrait ===
In her self-portrait, Lama is depicted at 45 years old. She holds a paintbrush and palette and has chosen to dress in simple attire. Around her wrist is a double-looped pearl bracelet.

=== The Martyrdom of Saint Eurosia ===
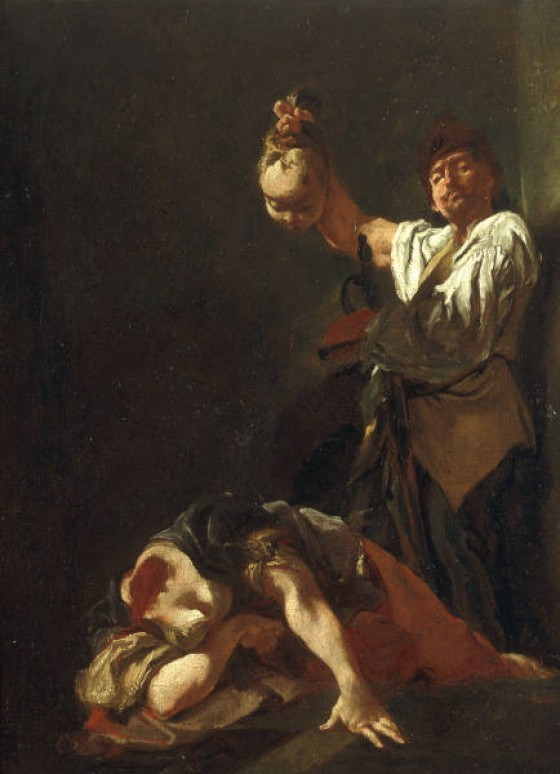
The Martyrdom of Saint Eurosia, c. 1730, Fondazione Fantoni di Rovetta, Bergamo

Lama's depiction of the beheading of Saint Eurosia was displayed in either the Church of Saint Eurosia or the adjacent Oratory of the Assumption of Mary and Saint Eurosia at Le Vignole. The previous owner of the piece is unknown. The Ca' Rezzonico Museum registered the painting in 1962, when Gatti Casazza donated his collection to the museum.

=== Judith and Holofernes ===
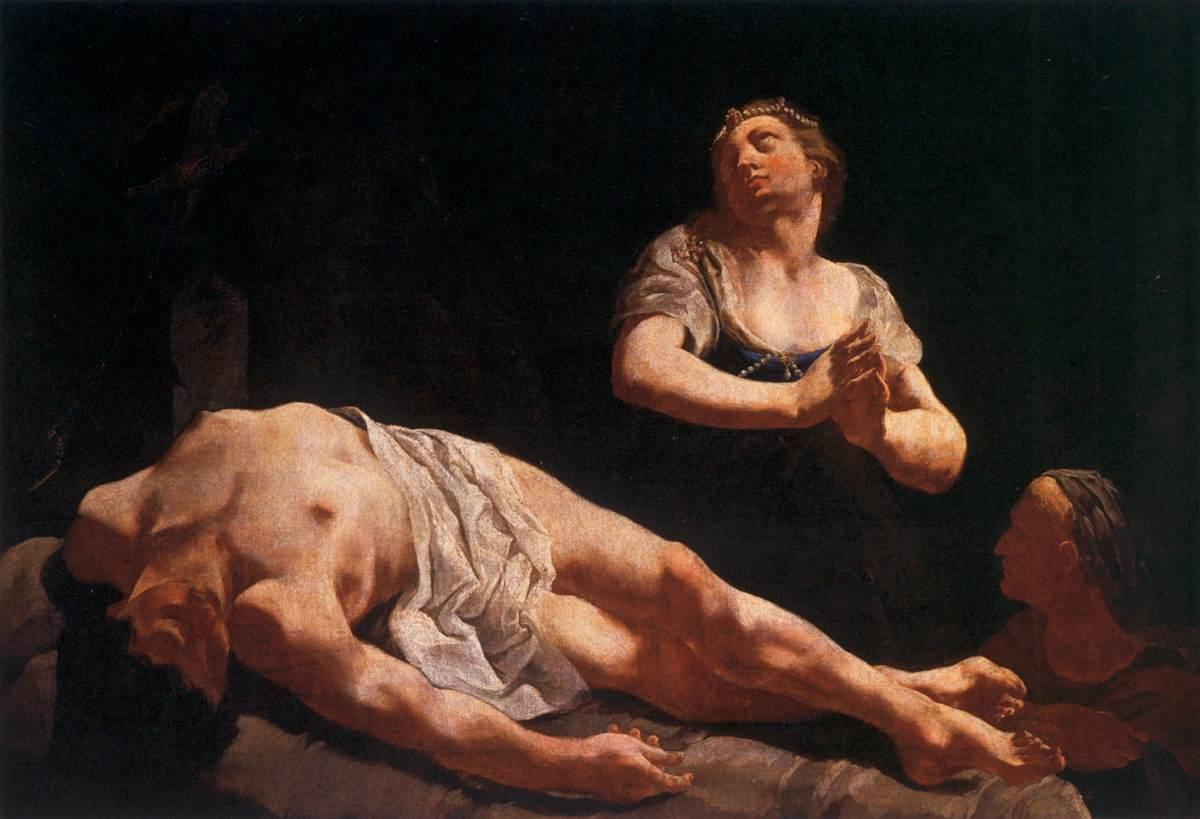
Judith and Holofernes, c. 1725, Galleria dell'Accademia

Lama created two versions of Judith beheading Holofernes. The earlier version, created in 1725, is housed at the Galleria dell'Accademia in Venice (shown on the left). Lama created a later version in 1735, which is part of the G. Rossi Collection in Milan.

=== The Rape of Europa ===
"The Rape of Europa" is a now-lost piece by Lama. Antonio Schinella Conti describes the work in his letter:

"The subject is The Rape of Europa [now lost], but the bull is in the forest, far from the sea, and her companions dance around the beast that carries Europa, laughing. The group of these figures is filled with poetry, so much so that this woman has more cords in her art and excels in painting as much as in poetry – her poetry is in the style of Petrarch."

== Poetry ==
Though there is limited information about the number of poems Lama composed, sources indicate that she wrote two songs, three sonnets, and a eulogy. The eulogy honors the death of her literary friend, Abbot Antonio Sforza.

== Death ==
Sources indicate that Lama may have died of the plague on 8 October 1747. The record states:

Lady Giulia, the daughter of Agostino Lama, about 66 years of age, ill with acute fever due to a skin disease, which degenerated into convulsions, died today at 21 hours on the 8th day.

She was buried at the Church of Santi Giovanni e Paolo.
