= Arrone (river) =

River in Lazio Region, Italy

Location
- Country: Italy

Physical characteristics
- Mouth: Tyrrhenian Sea
  - coordinates: 41.8713°N 12.1793°E

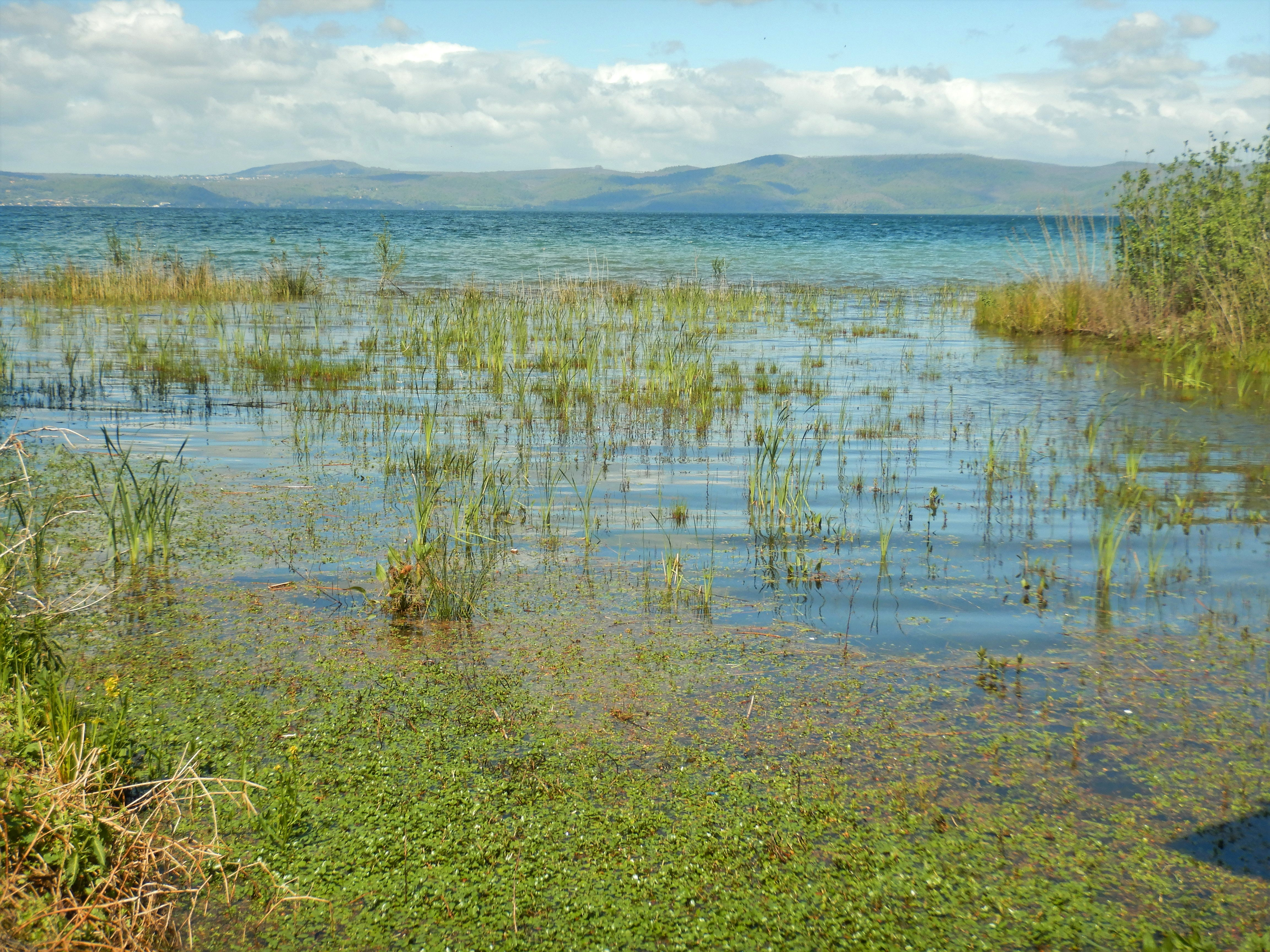

The Arrone is an Italian river that flows into the Tyrrhenian Sea. Its source is Lake Bracciano. The river flows out of the lake by Anguillara Sabazia and enters the Tyrrhenian Sea near Maccarese and Fregene, localities in the commune of Fiumicino.

There is another unrelated Italian river named 'Arrone' that also flows into the Tyrrhenian Sea. Its source is near Piansano.
