= Cascine in Busto Arsizio =

The comune of Busto Arsizio has 80 cascine, along with 36 now demolished cascine.

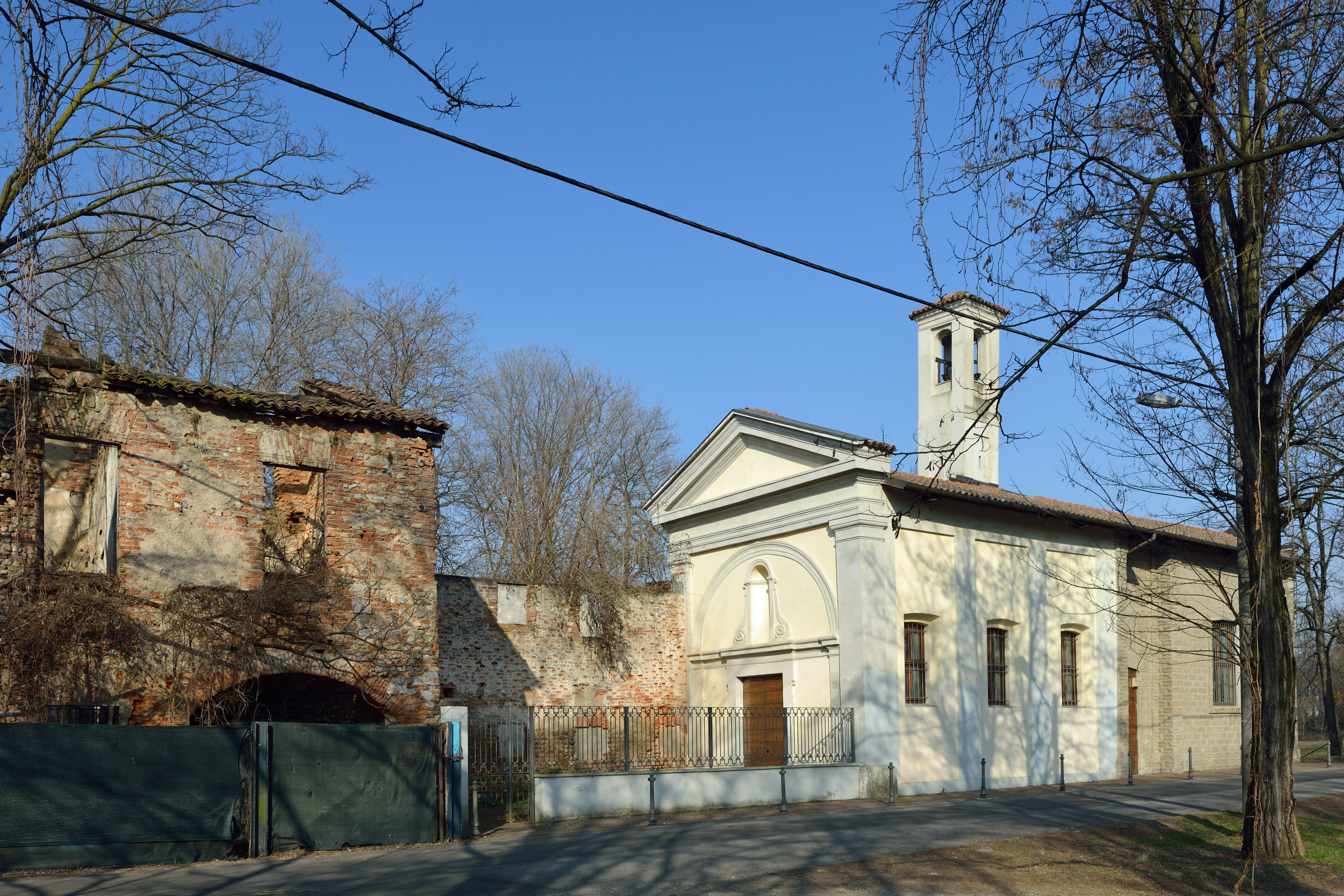
The Cascina dei Poveri and the Church of San Bernardino.

The first Cascine in Busto Arsizio were constructed near the urban centres of Borsano, Sacconago, and Busto Arsizio. The ones in the countryside were constructed along a main road. Between the 18th and 19th centuries, more farmers arrived in the area of Busto Arsizio, and farms began to replace the moorland, and thus new Cascine were constructed, mainly in the northwest area of Busto Arsizio. Several cascine were listed in the Catasto Teresiano between 1718 and 1760, the most important of which were the Cascina dei Poveri, Cascina Selvascia and Cascina Malavita (all in Busto Arsizio), and the Cascina Burattana and Cascina del Sole (in Borsano).

In another Catasto, which took place in the 19th century, we find 23 new cascine in Busto Arsizio, including Cascina Pozzi, Cascina Favana, and Cascina Malpensa, and 4 new cascine in Sacconago, including the Cascina Brughetto. Between the late 19th century and early 20th century, hundreds of cascine were constructed near the old city border, but have now since been incorporated into the city of Busto Arsizio, due to the expansion of the city.

== The Cascine ==
=== Cascina Bernasconi ===
Located just 300 meters north from the church of San Michele Arcangelo, the Cascina Bernasconi was constructed at some point between the 18th and 19th century. There is not much information regarding the cascina before the 1857 Catasto Cessato, where it was listed as a property owned by Giuseppe Bernasconi. Part of the cascina was demolished in 2000. The façade of the Cascina depicts a religious scene.

=== Cascina Brughetto ===
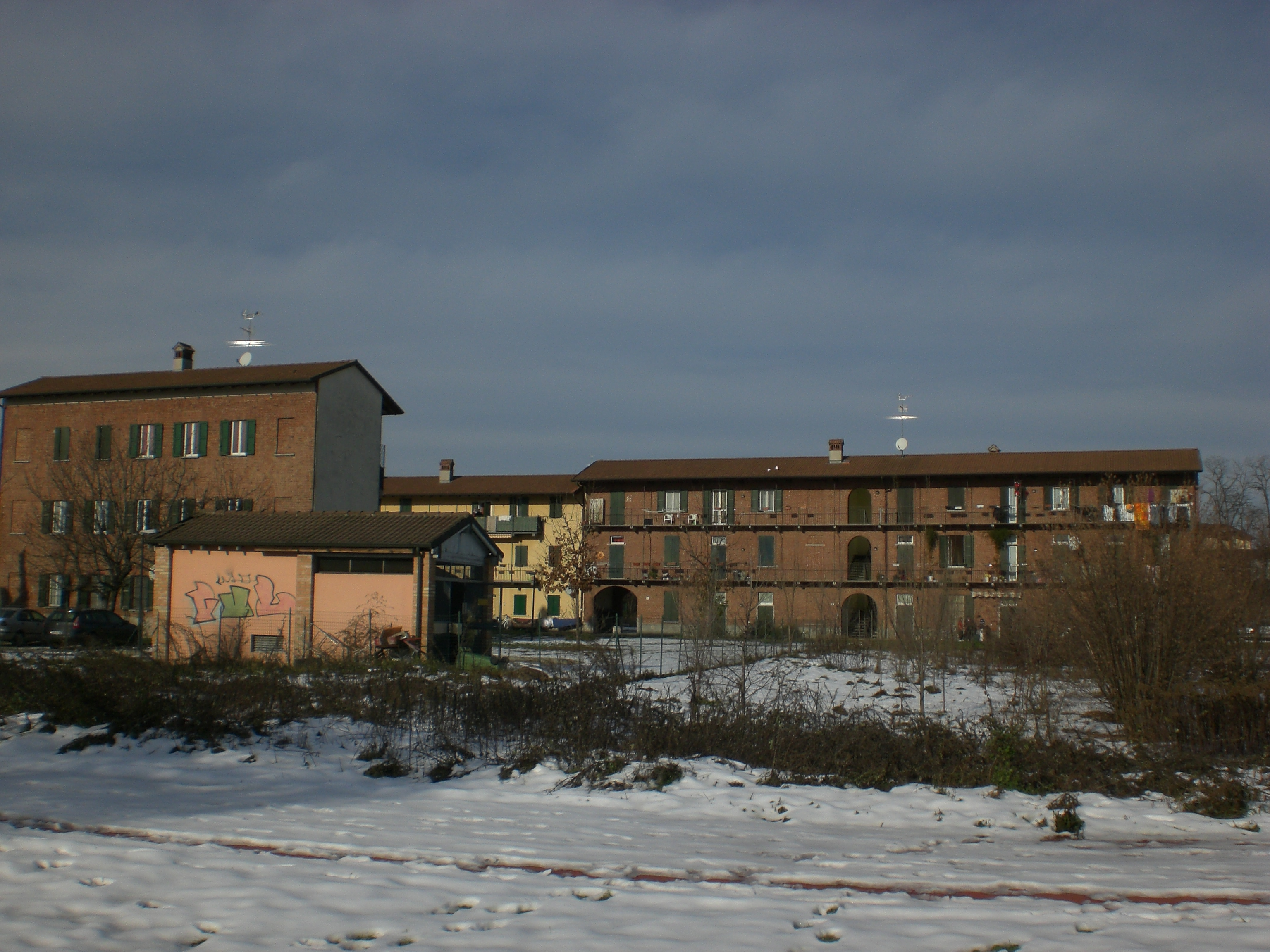
Cascina Brughetto

Located in the south of Busto Arsizio, the Cascina Brughetto was built by the Rauli family between the 12th and 13th century. It was one of the most important cascine in the area of Busto Arsizio, and in 1722 a small chapel dedicated to Saint Eurosia was constructed. The chapel was demolished in 1952, after the nearby church of Sant’Edoardo and the church of Santa Croce di Brughetto were constructed. The Cascina was an independent comune until 1730, when it was incorporated with the then comune of Sacconago (now a frazione of Busto Arsizio). In 1740 the Cascina was purchased by the Ranoli family, and subsequently by the Travelli family. In 1970 it was purchased by the Comune of Busto Arsizio. Much of the original buildings have been demolished and replaced, apart from the entrance of the Cascina.

=== Cascina Burattana ===
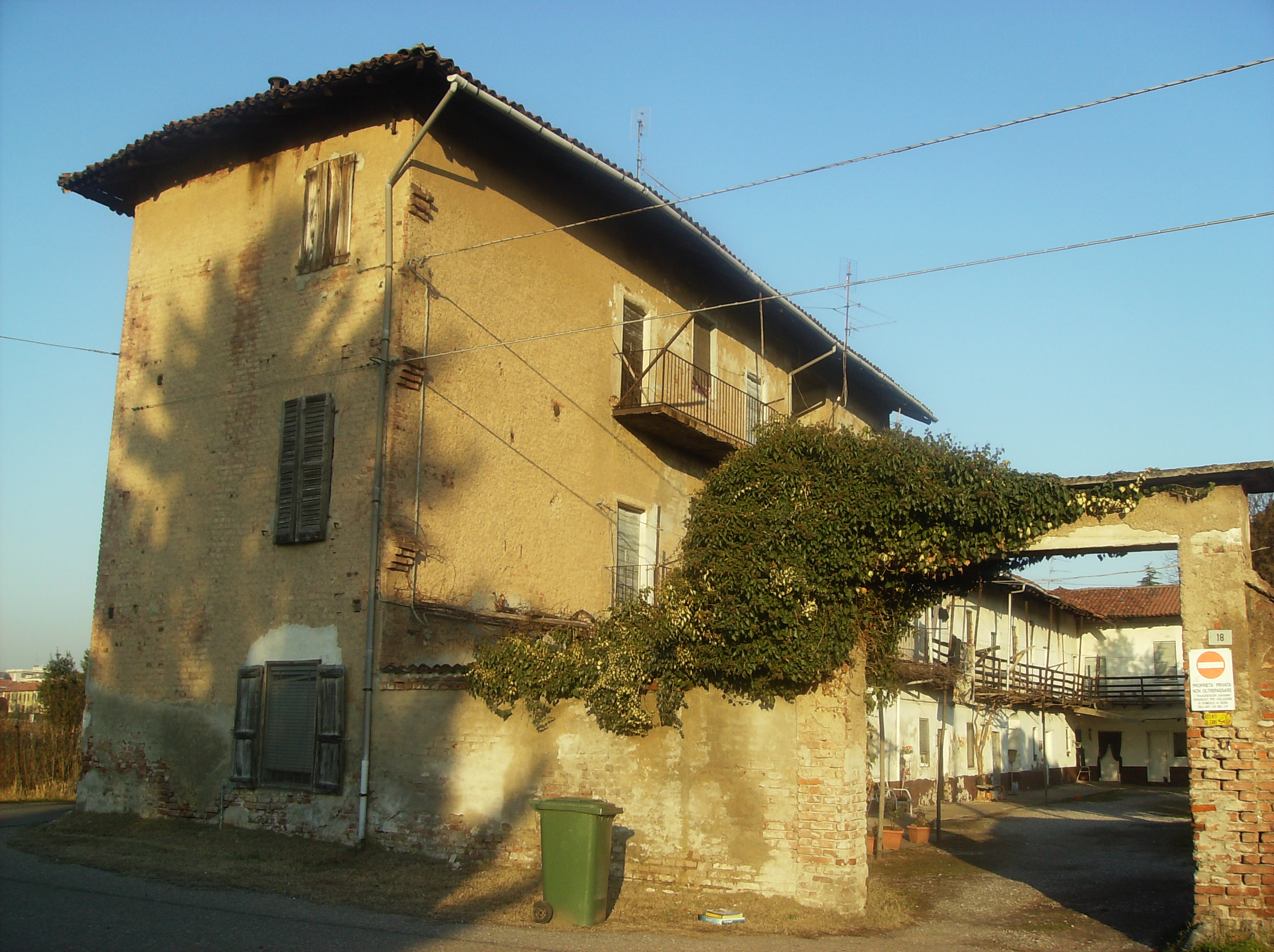
Cascina Burattana

The Cascina Burattana is a cascina located in Borsano and was constructed in the 17th century. The cascina was owned by Cristoforo Turati and his descendants until the 19th century, when it was sold to the Bonomi brothers, and subsequently sold to the Durini family, a noble family from Gorla Minore. The cascina maintains all its original buildings, and none have been demolished. In the 1990s the cascina was bought by the Comune of Busto Arsizio. It fell into a state of disrepair, and in October of 2025, the comune of Busto Arsizio agreed on a proposal to save and restore the Cascina.

=== Cascina Favana ===
Located on Via Favana, near the cemetery, the cascina was one of the oldest in Busto Arsizio. In 1776, the cascina was rather small and owned and inhabited by the Farioli family. By 1857, the cascina was expanded and bought by the Lualdi family. In the 20th century the cascina was expanded once more, and was set to be divided in 2. Half of the cascina would house communal services, while the other half would maintain its original status as a series of homes. The cascina was subsequently abandoned and now is in a state of extreme disrepair.

=== Cascina Lualdi ===
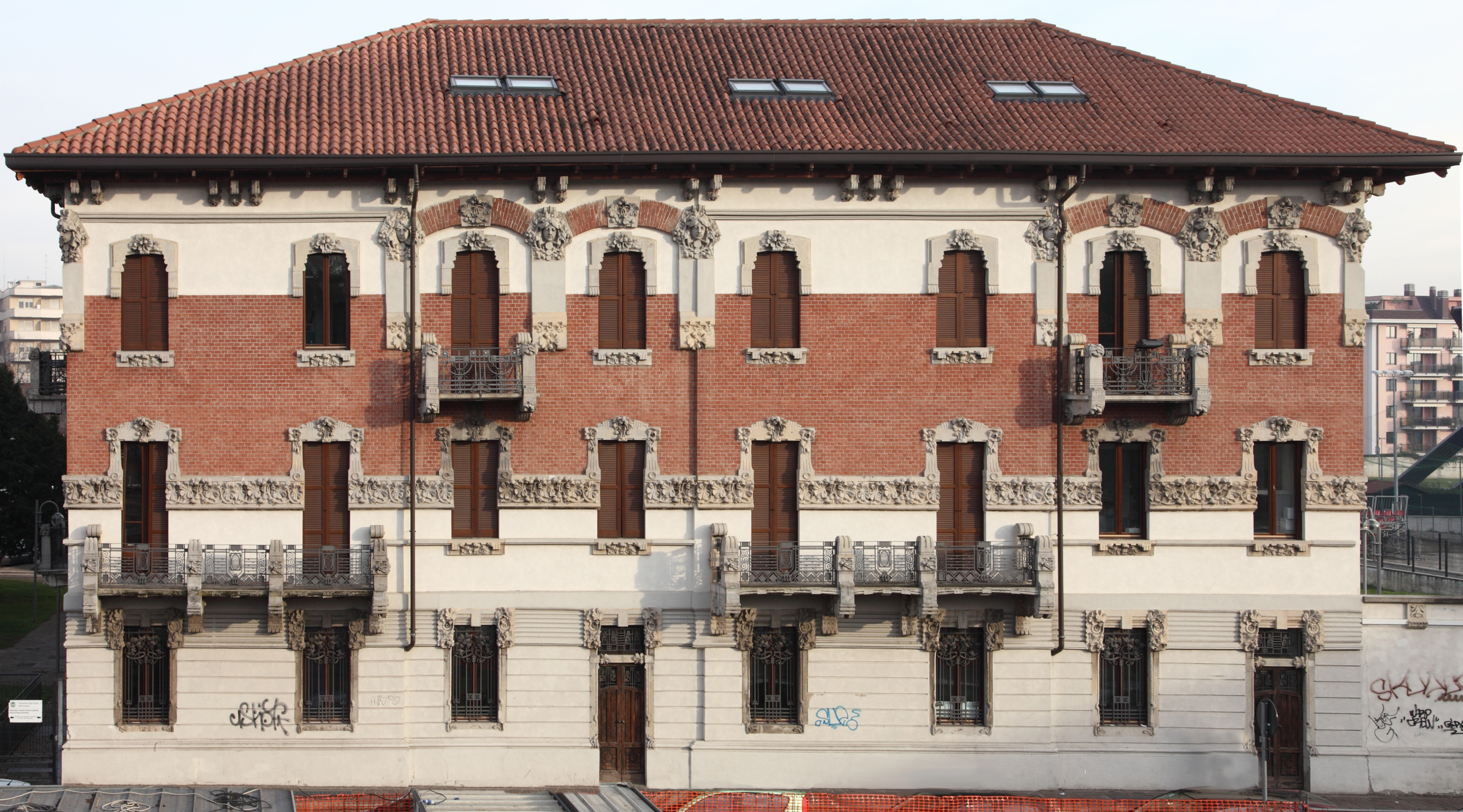
Casa Colombo (built over Cascina Lualdi)

Built in the 18th century, the cascina was located south of Busto Arsizio, on the Strada del Borghetto (now Via Luciano Manara). Originally it was owned by Francesco Azzimonti, who sold it to Giuseppe Lualdi, who expanded it. It was expanded again in the 20th century, and was sold by the Lualdi family to Luigi Colombo, who used the cascina and the land surrounding it to construct a textile factory. He then demolished the Cascina Lualdi in 1915, to construct Casa Colombo, a villa built in Art Nouveau style and designed by architect Silvio Gambini. The villa was subsequently sold to the Comune of Busto Arsizio.

=== Cascina Malavita ===
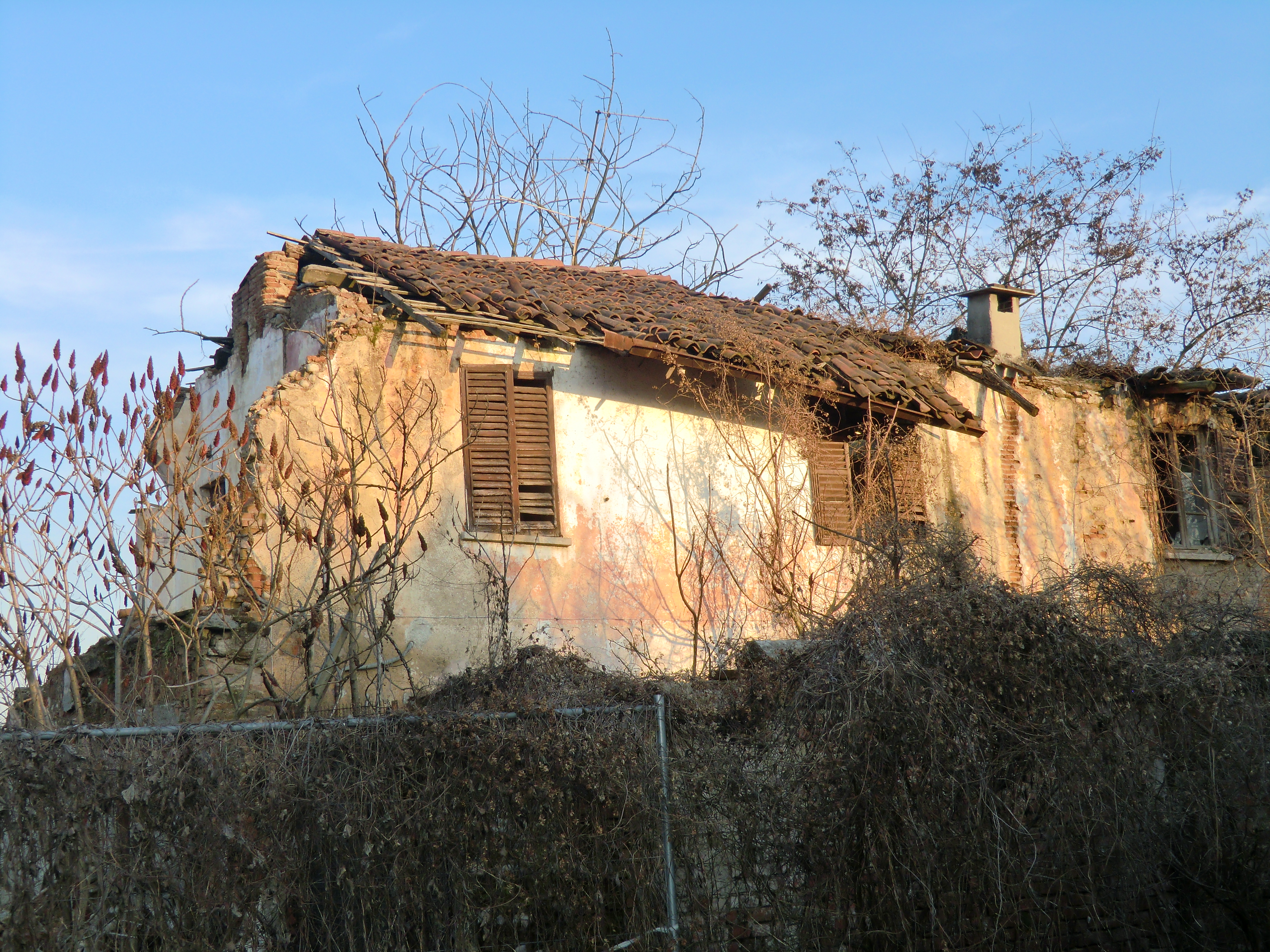
Cascina Malavita

The Cascina Malavita was one of Busto Arsizio’s most important cascine. Built in the 19th century, it is located north of the city, near the border with Samarate. In 1776 it was owned by Antonio Pisano and Carlo Cassano, and housed 10 people. The cascina was abandoned in the late 20th century, and was partially demolished. It currently remains in an abandoned state and only part of the original structure still stands.

=== Cascina dei Poveri ===
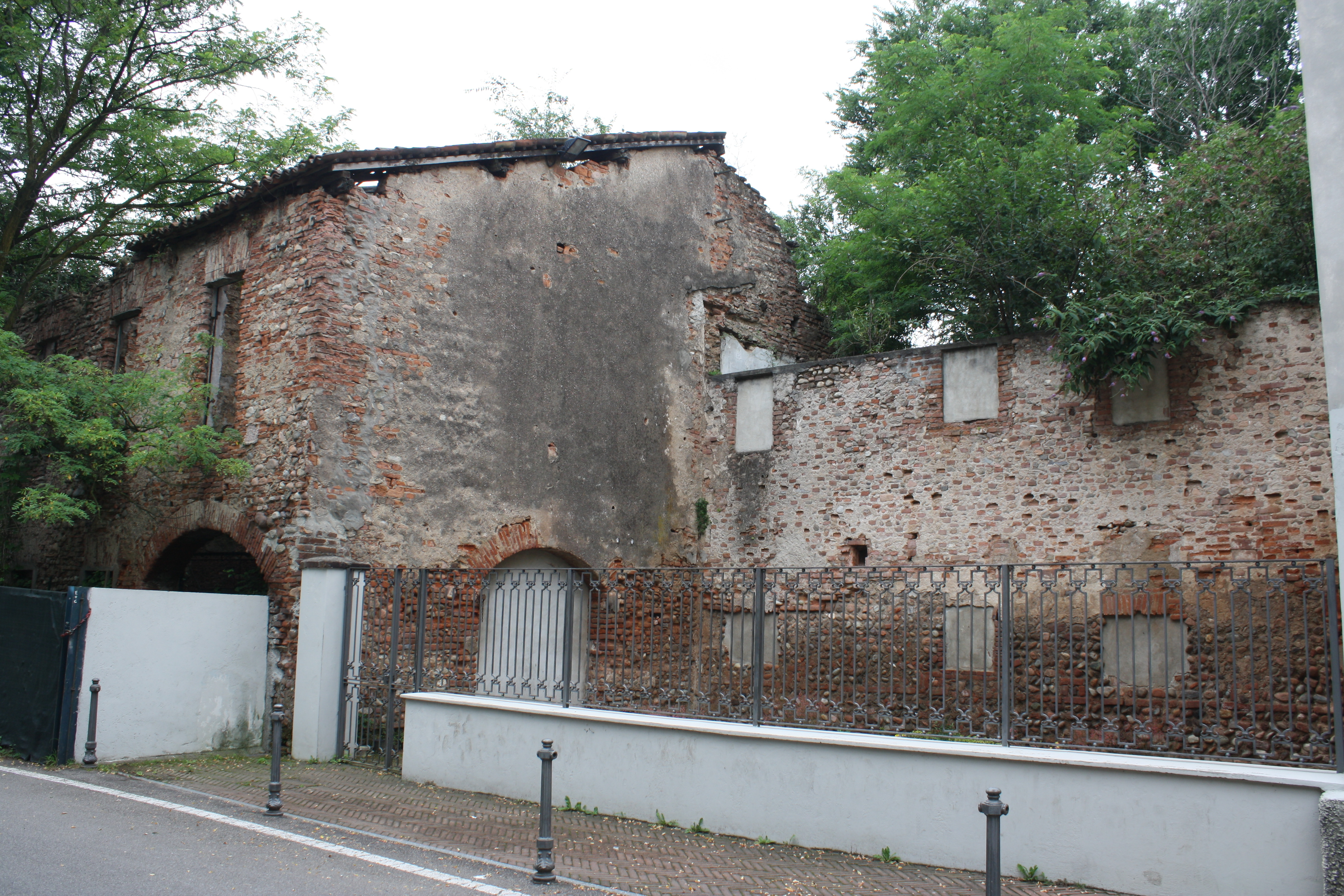
Cascina dei Poveri

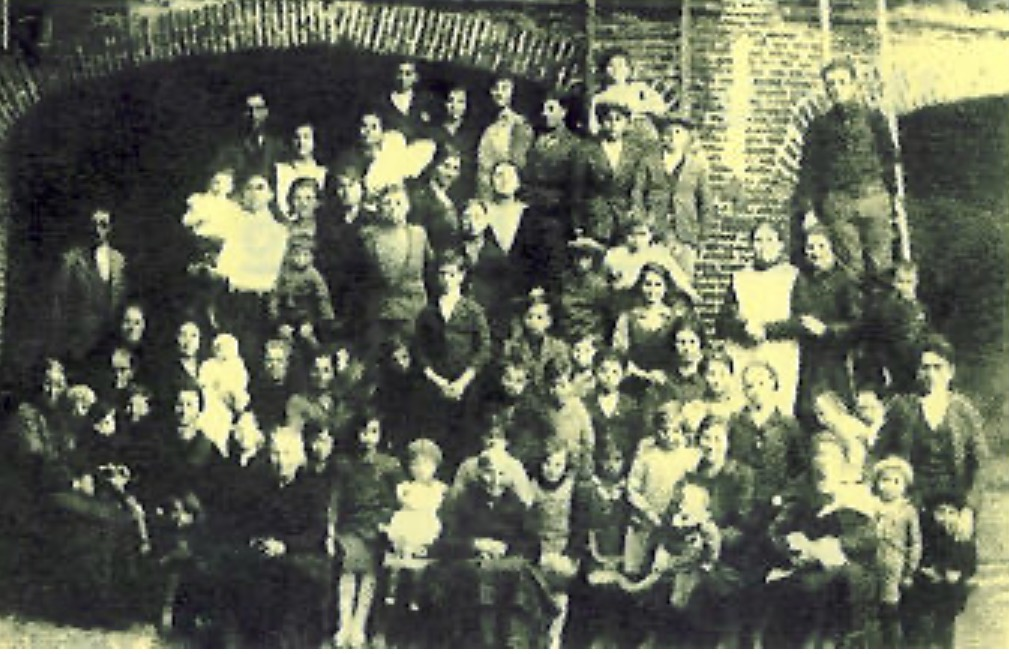
The residents of the cascina, early 20th century

Built before the 13th century, it is one of Busto Arsizio’s oldest cascine. It was here in 1427 that the Blessed Giuliana Puricelli was born. Like the Cascina Brughetto, it was an independent comune associated with Gallarate. Between 1663 and 1667 the church of San Bernardino, church of the Cascina dei Poveri, was constructed. It was expanded in 1920. In 1967 the church closed due to lack of attendance. By the late 1970s the cascina was abandoned and is now in a state of decay. In 2000 Alfredo Castiglioni restored the church of San Bernardino, but the cascina remains closed and in extreme disrepair.
