= Trevignano Romano =

- Comune
- Comune di Trevignano Romano
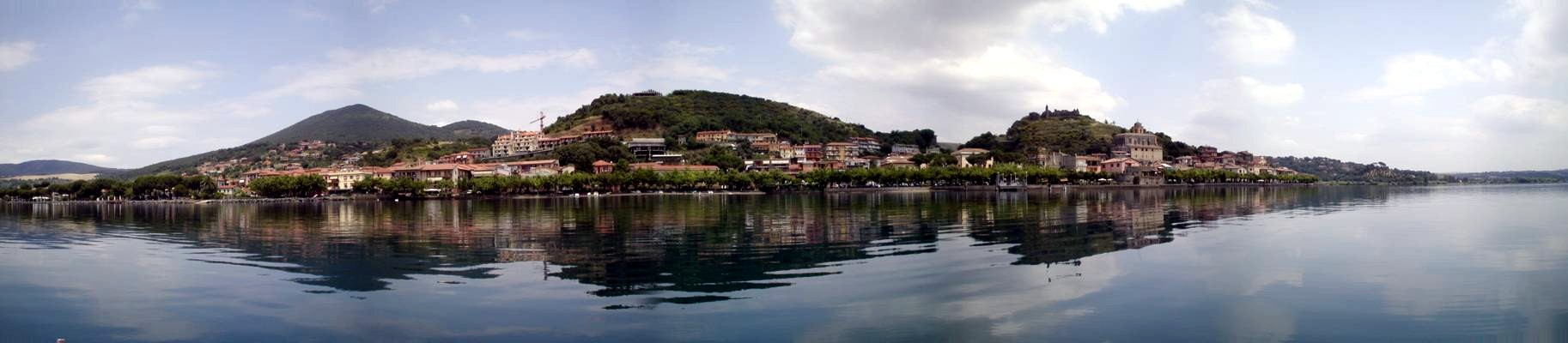
- View of Trevignano Romano

- Coat of arms

- Location within Italy Location within Lazio
- Coordinates: 42°09.5′N 12°14.5′E
- Country: Italy
- Region: Lazio
- Metropolitan city: Rome (RM)

Government
  - Mayor: Claudia Maciucchi

Area
  - Total: 39 km^{2} (15 sq mi)
- Elevation: 173 m (568 ft)

Population (31 December 2015)
  - Total: 5,725
  - Density: 150/km^{2} (380/sq mi)
- Demonym: Trevignanesi
- Time zone: UTC+1 (CET)
  - Summer (DST): UTC+2 (CEST)
- Postal code: 00069
- Dialing code: 06
- Patron saint: St. Bernardino of Siena
- Saint day: May 20
- Website: http://www.trevignanoromano.gov.it

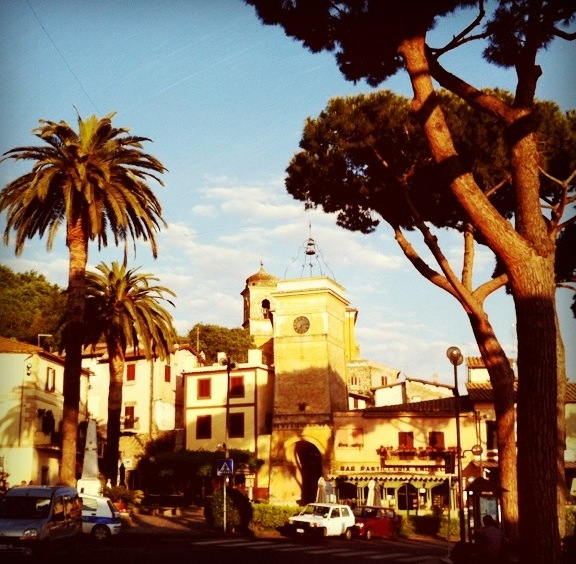
Trevignano's historical centre.

Trevignano Romano is a small town and comune in the Metropolitan City of Rome, Lazio, central Italy. With a population of about 5,000, it is located on the volcanic Lake Bracciano. It is about 47 kilometres (29 mi) away from Rome.

== History ==
The presence of people in the area dates back to the Paleolithic, as shown by the La Marmotta settlement in the nearby Anguillara Sabazia. Etruscans were settled in the area for a long while: tombs from the 8th - 6th centuries BC have been found in the hills north of Trevignano; well-preserved artifacts from two of these tombs are on display at the local Roman Etruscan Museum. In 387 BC when Veii fell, the Romans conquered the whole area and eventually built many villas on the lakeshore, some now below water. The magnificent imperial thermal spa and villa in Vicarello and the Aqueduct of Trajan were built later.

During the Medieval Age, Trevignano was owned by the Prefetti di Vico and the Orsini and defended by a fortress, built on the top of the city and destroyed during the war between the Borgia and the Orsini Family. Later the city became the property of some important Roman families: Odescalchi, Del Grillo, Cybo Malaspina, Conti, Torlonia, Ginori Conti and Del Drago.

The castle was erected around 1200 by order of Pope Innocent III, and later reinforced by the Orsini. It once had three layers of massive walls, but the siege of Cesare Borgia in 1497 and subsequent earthquakes have reduced the structures to a state of poor repair.

== Tourism ==
Trevignano Romano has considerably fewer inhabitants than the other two major towns overlooking Lake Bracciano, which are Anguillara Sabazia and Bracciano. Trevignano Romano does not have a train station either. These two characteristics have made the town much less a destination for internal emigration from the city of Rome and more of a tourist destination.

The village faces south, enjoying a mild climate year-round. Trevignano Romano's lakefront promenade, about a mile long and filled with gardens and bistros, allows visitors to spend a few hours around Lake Bracciano.

The historic center contains the Roman Etruscan Museum in Vittorio Emanuele III Square, which offers free admission.

A stone hill overlooks the historic center, where the remains of the Orsini Fortress, dating back to at least the 13th century, are located. The hill also overlooked Lake Bracciano.

Trevignano Romano has been awarded the Orange Flag of the Italian Touring Club, relating to its historical-environmental heritage and tourist facilities.

For five consecutive years, Trevignano Romano has also been awarded the Blue Flag, an international recognition that sanctions the quality and cleanliness of the water and shoreline.

== The case of Gisella Cardia ==
On April 10, 2023, the visionary declared that she had seen the Madonna appear before her, however the news does not confirm this.
