= Maccarese =

- Frazione
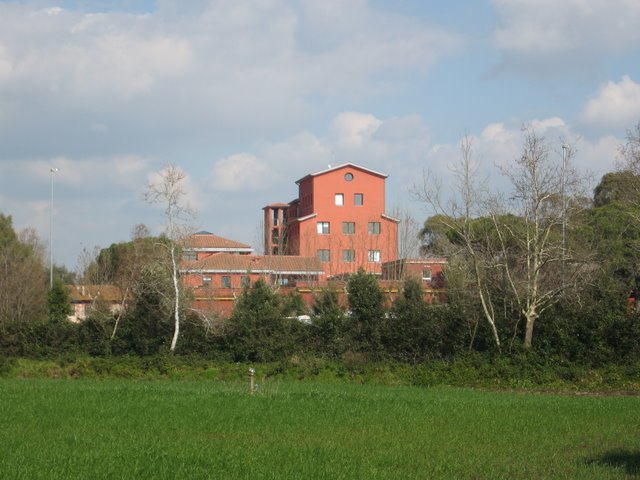
- The headquarters of Bioversity International in Maccarese.
- Interactive map of Maccarese
- Region: Lazio
- Comune: Rome, Fiumicino

Population (2011)
  - Total: 4,559
- Time zone: UTC+1 (CET)
  - Summer (DST): UTC+2 (CEST)

Maccarese is a locality in Lazio, Italy, in the Metropolitan City of Rome. Its administration is divided between the Municipalities of Rome (Maccarese Nord) and Fiumicino, of which it is a frazione.
It was entirely part of the Municipality of Rome until 1993, when the former Circoscrizione XIV, which included a part of the hamlet, became the autonomous Municipality of Fiumicino.

Crossed by the Arrone river, which flows into the Tyrrhenian Sea, the locality - which extends from the Fiumicino Airport to the sea and borders Fregene to the north-west - is best known for the homonymous farm Maccarese S.p.A., established in 1925 following the reclamation works of the Ager Romanus.

== History ==
The first evidence of a permanent settlement dates back to the Copper Age (3400-2200 BC). In this period a village of huts was established in the area that is currently called Cerquete-Fianello, located in the southern part of the locality (Manfredini et alii, 2002).
Before the reclamation, the territory was rather marshy, with two little lakes (now dried up), one located in the area farthest from the most populated area and the other near the castle called Villa San Giorgio.

A property of the Roman family of the Normanni in the 13th century, around 1300 it saw the building of the castle of Villa San Giorgio, which hosted the Alessandrini, the Anguillara and later the Mattei; the latter, during the 16th century, unified Vaccarese with the estates of Cortecchia and Castello San Giorgio, together with estates of other families of the Roman nobility and religious bodies. The estate ultimately reached the total extent of about 1,700 rubbi (equal to over 3,000 hectares).

In 1569 the restoration of the castle took place, while in 1574 Torre Primavera was built. In the 17th century the estate passed from the Mattei into the hands of the Rospigliosi, who were the last owners before the estate's complete reclamation.

In 1925 the great reclamation began, promoted by a company made up by financial investors. Motivated by the fees made available by the State, they tried to reclaim the area with the aim of making the land fertile, dividing the estate into farms and then selling them.
The project was not completed. Due to a substantial increase in the availability of new farmlands spawned by the reclamation project, the prices of landed properties and agricultural products had in the meantime collapsed. Hence, by the beginning of the 1930s, the land was no longer seen as a safe haven. Unsustainably high operating costs meant investors were forced to rely on a public holding company, IRI.

In the meantime, numerous settlers arrived from the Province of Mantua and above all from Veneto to cultivate fields, plant vineyards and manage dairy cattle. Over the years Maccarese became a showcase of Italian agriculture.

Starting in the 1950s, workforce redundancies and controversial management decisions led to a long downturn that lasted until 1998, when the company - which owned more than 45 km^{2} (17 sq mi) of agricultural land as well as the castle and other important buildings - was privatised and purchased by Edizione Holding of the Benetton brothers for 94 billion lire.

== IPGRI - Maccarese mill ==
In 1997 the European Union recognized the Maccarese area as suitable for the construction of a science and technology park, which would take advantage of both good infrastructural connections and the proximity of universities to create an environment favorable to the development of scientific innovation, especially in the agricultural sector. The possibility of creating the park was given to the International Plant Genetic Resources Institute (IPGRI), the most important world reference for the conservation and use of plant genetic resources. Since July 2001, the official headquarters of IPGRI have been located in Maccarese, in an area of great agricultural tradition, inside a former mill that has been completely renovated. The President of the Republic Carlo Azeglio Ciampi was present at the inauguration of the new headquarters. The building is a former mill designed to store cereals and to process agricultural products before distribution.

== Nature reserve ==
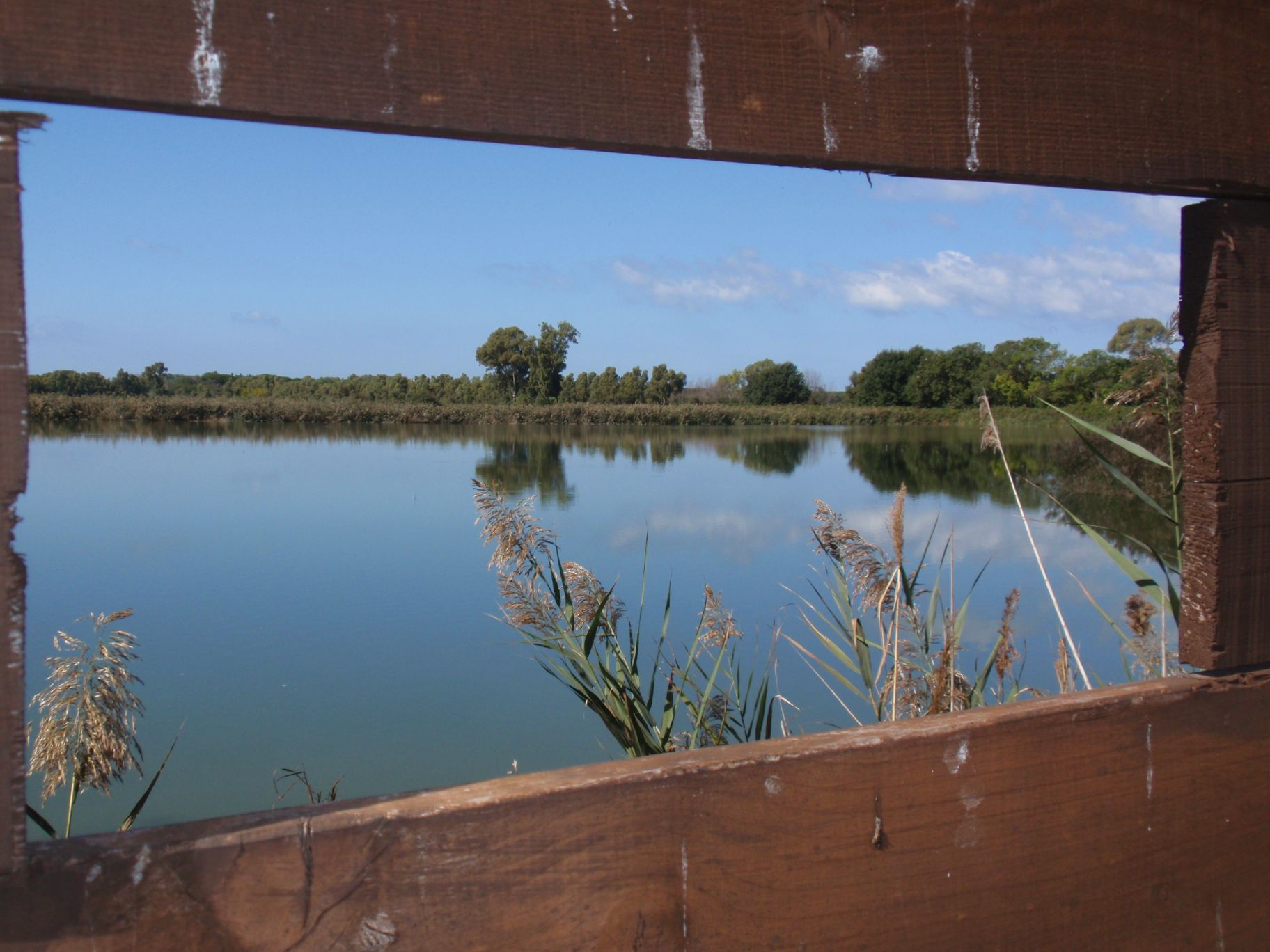
Vasche del Maccarese WWF oasis.

Vasche del Maccarese is a natural oasis managed by WWF Italia, part of the Litorale Romano State Nature Reserve.

In summertime it becomes one of the favorite destinations of the inhabitants of the district (especially young people), due to its proximity to the Fregene / Maccarese coast, where bathing facilities have sprung up since the late 1970s (the official beach of the Polizia di Stato is also located there); furthermore, several personalities of entertainment and journalism reside there (an example is the house of Alberto Moravia near the coast).

== Infrastructures and transport ==
The Maccarese-Fregene railway station is located along the Tyrrhenian Railway; Maccarese is also served by some bus lines of the Municipality of Fiumicino. It can be reached via the Autostrada A12 (Fregene-Maccarese exit), which connects it to Rome, about 35 km (21.7 mi) away.

== Sport ==
=== Football ===
- Giada Maccarese C.L., a junior football team
- A.S.D. Maccarese Calcio, a defunct football team
- W3 Maccarese who play at w3 stadium, they compete in the Eccellenza Girone ‘A’

== See also ==
- Fregenae
- Litorale Romano State Nature Reserve

== Bibliography ==
- A. Manfredini (2002). Le dune, il lago, il mare. Una comunità di villaggio dell'età del rame a Maccarese. Florence: Istituto Italiano di Preistoria. ISBN 978-88-6045-009-8.
