= Fregenae =

Fregene
- Frazione
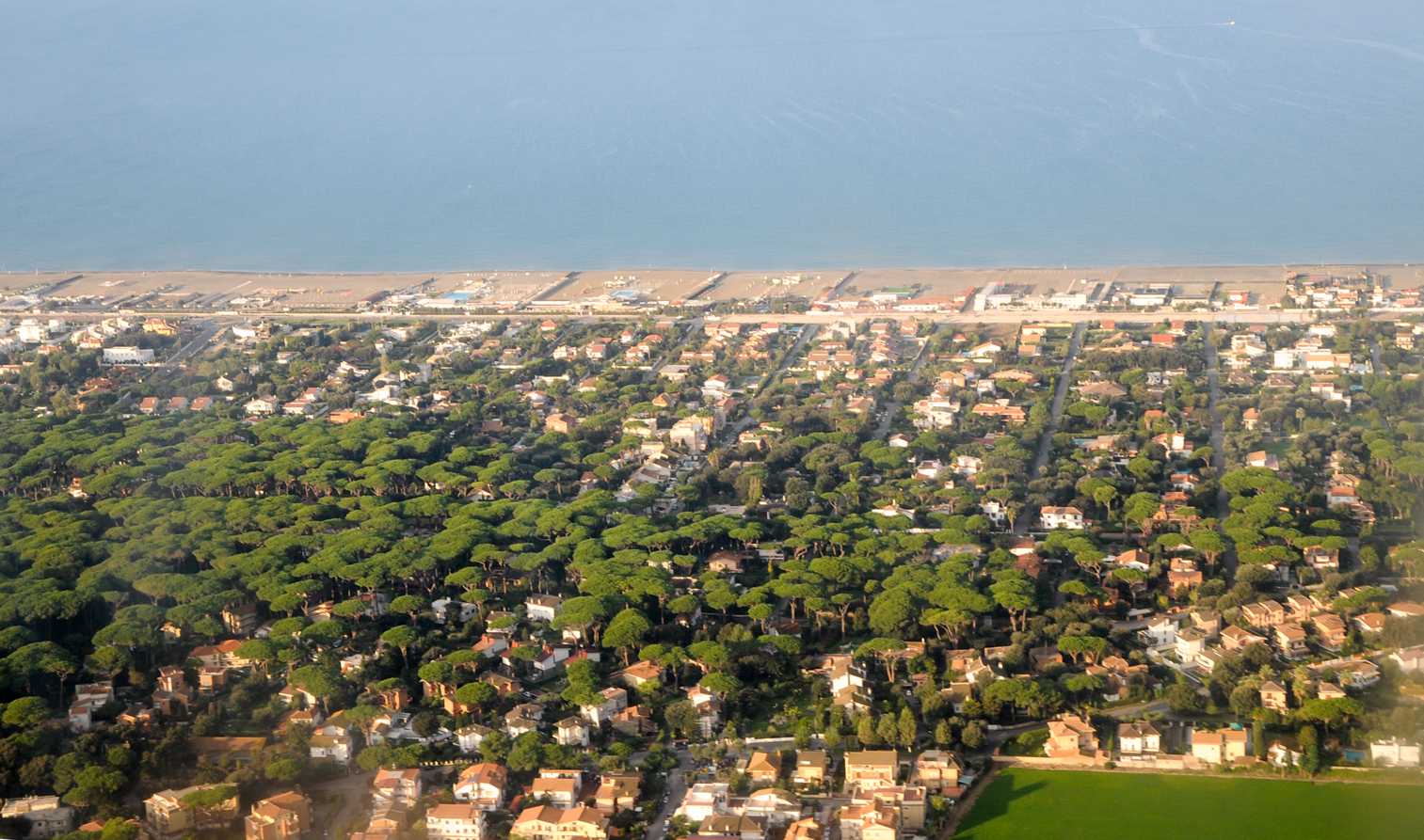
- Aerial view of Fregene

- Location of Fregene in Italy
- Coordinates: 41°51′11″N 12°11′36″E
- Country: Italy
- Region: Lazio
- Metropolitan city: Rome (RM)
- Comune: Fiumicino
- Elevation: 4 m (13 ft)

Population (2012)
  - Total: 6,445
- Demonym: Fregenini
- Time zone: UTC+1 (CET)
  - Summer (DST): UTC+2 (CEST)
- Postal code: 00054
- Dialing code: 06

Fregenae (Italian: Fregene) was a maritime town of ancient Etruria, situated between Alsium and the mouth of the Tiber. The modern Fregene is an Italian hamlet (frazione) of Fiumicino, in the Metropolitan City of Rome Capital, Lazio. As of 2012 its population was of 6,445.

== History ==
=== Ancient Fregenae ===
Livy mentions Fregenae among the coloniae maritimae (xxxvi. 3); and there is every reason to suppose that it was established at the same time with Alsium, in 245 BCE, and that we should read Fregenae for Fregellae in Velleius Paterculus, where he speaks of the foundation of these two colonies. This is confirmed by the Epitome of the 19th book of Livy, where, though Alsium is not mentioned, the foundation of Fregenae is coupled with that of Brundusium, which Velleius refers to the following year. No subsequent notice of it occurs in history: its marshy and unhealthy situation probably prevented its rising to prosperity; and, after the construction of the Portus Augusti on the right bank of the Tiber, it seems to have gradually sunk into insignificance. Hence, though its name is found in Strabo, Pliny, and the Itineraries, it is not noticed by Rutilius in his description of the coast of Etruria, and no ruins now mark the site. But the distances given in the Itinerary of 9 M.P. from Alsium, and the same from Portus Augusti at the mouth of the Tiber, enable us to fix its position with certainty at a spot now called Fregene in the comune of Fiumicino.

=== Modern Fregene ===
The modern town was created in 1928 as part of a large drainage project along the coasts of Lazio, near Maccarese, to create a sea resort. From the 1970s Fregene grew as part of the urban expansion of Rome metropolitan area. Until 1992 It was part of the municipality of Rome, when Fiumicino was created as an independent municipality.

== Geography ==
Fregene is located on Tyrrhenian coast, 31 km in north of Fiumicino, near its international airport and the villages of Maccarese, Focene and Passo Oscuro. It is 24 km far from Ladispoli, 42 from Rome and 55 from Civitavecchia. Nearest railway station is Maccarese-Fregene on Rome-Pisa line.

== See also ==
- Arrone River
- Rome-Fiumicino Airport
