= Passo Oscuro =

- Frazione
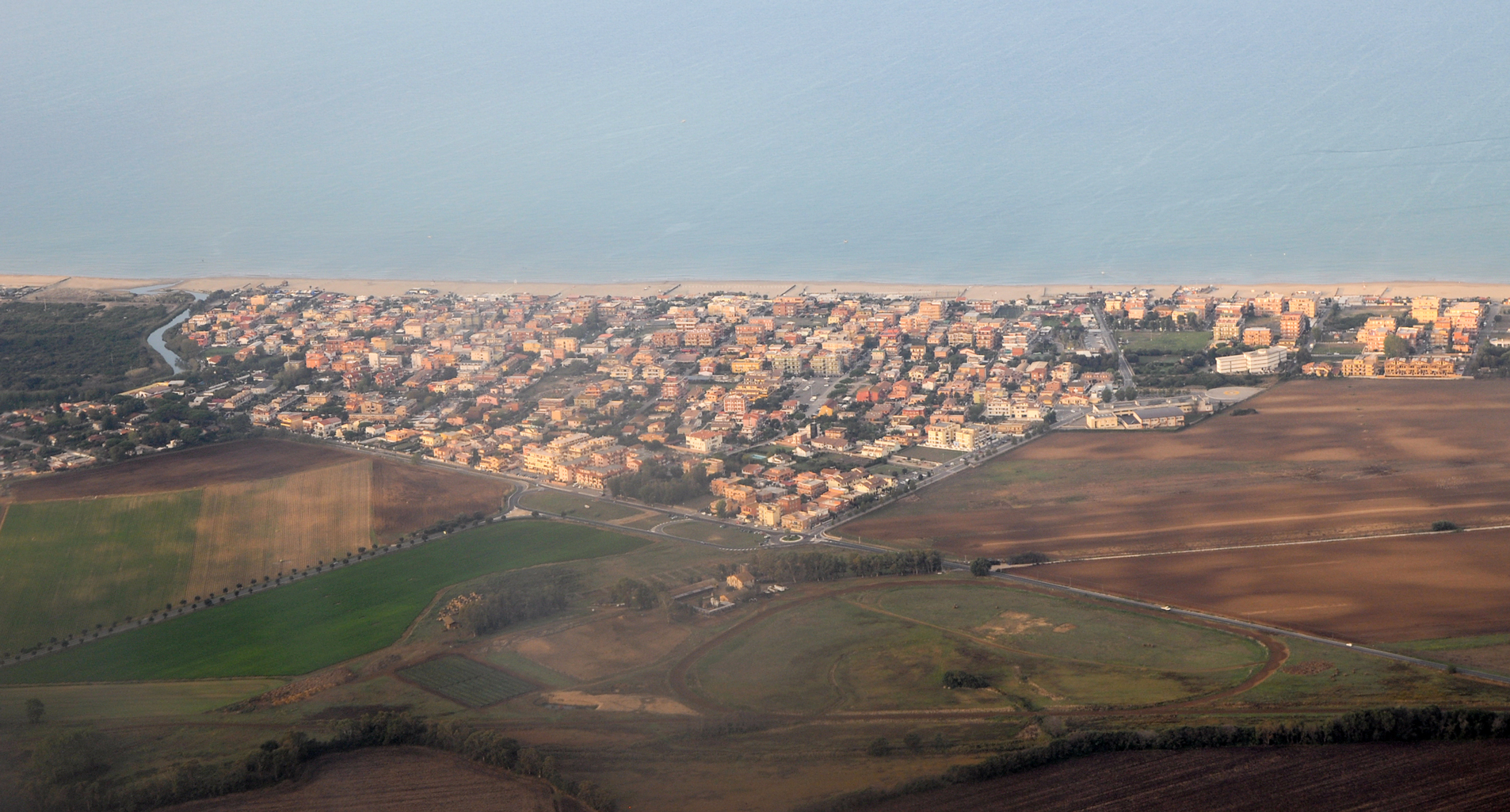
- Aerial view of Passo Oscuro

- Location of Passo Oscuro in Italy
- Coordinates: 41°54′08″N 12°09′26″E
- Country: Italy
- Region: Lazio
- Province: Rome (RM)
- Comune: Fiumicino
- Elevation: 4 m (13 ft)

Population (2019)
  - Total: 4,173
- Time zone: UTC+1 (CET)
  - Summer (DST): UTC+2 (CEST)
- Postal code: 00054
- Dialing code: 06

Passo Oscuro (or Passoscuro) is a small town and beach resort situated in the comune of Fiumicino in the Lazio region of Italy, west of Rome, at the Tyrrhenian Sea, 5 km north of Fregene.

== History ==
The name Passo Oscuro, Italian for dark step, is said to derive from a hunting path. The name is mentioned in a note from pope Benedict XIII in 1724. The area was donated to the hospital Pio Istituto di Santo Spirito in Rome by the Peretti family, owners of the nearby castle Torre in Pietra. The modern town was populated during the 1920s mainly by fishermen, and development continued after World War II. Tourism has also developed, with day visitors from Rome as well as camping sites. It is the northernmost of all the bathing locations in Fiumicino, and its less central location offers fairly unspoilt beaches and sand dunes.

== Popular culture ==
The ending scene of Federico Fellini's La Dolce Vita was filmed on the beach of Passo Oscuro.

== See also ==
- Fregenae
