= Fiumicino =

- Comune
- Comune di Fiumicino
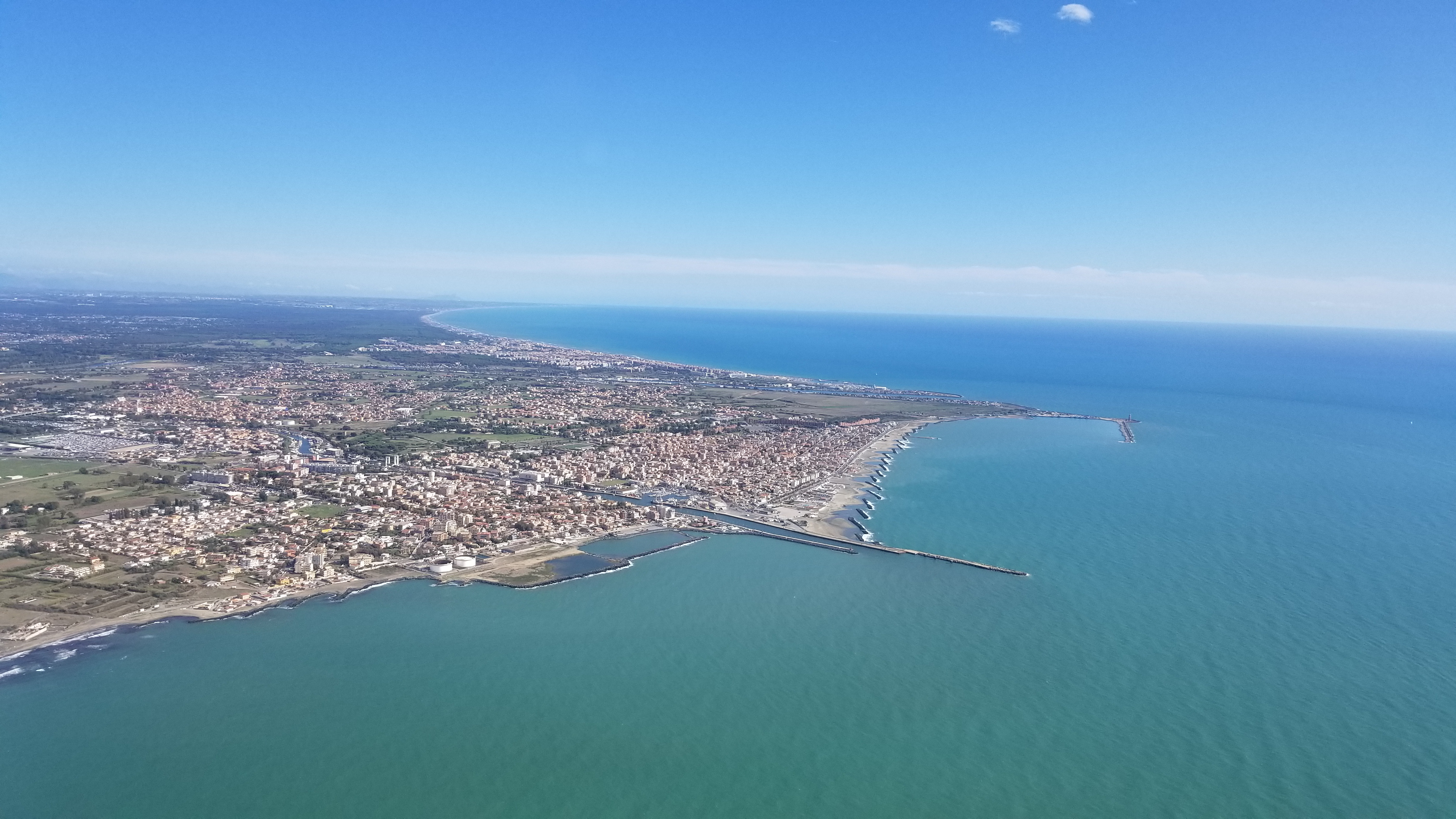
- Aerial view of Fiumicino

- Coat of arms

- Fiumicino within the Metropolitan City of Rome

- Location within Lazio Location within Italy Location within European Union
- Coordinates: 41°46′N 12°14′E
- Country: Italy
- Region: Lazio
- Metropolitan city: Rome (RM)
- Frazioni: Aeroporto "Leonardo da Vinci", Ara Nova, Casale del Castellaccio, Castel Campanile, Focene, Fregene, Isola Sacra, Le Vignole, Maccarese, Palidoro, Parco Leonardo, Passo Oscuro, Porto, Testa di Lepre, Torrimpietra, Tragliata, Tragliatella

Government
  - Mayor: Mario Baccini

Area
  - Total: 213 km^{2} (82 sq mi)
- Elevation: 1 m (3.3 ft)

Population (1 January 2019)
  - Total: 80,000
  - Density: 380/km^{2} (970/sq mi)
- Demonym: Fiumicinesi
- Time zone: UTC+1 (CET)
  - Summer (DST): UTC+2 (CEST)
- Postal code: 00050, 00054, 00057
- Dialing code: 06
- Patron saint: Hippolytus of Rome
- Saint day: 5 October
- Website: Official website

Fiumicino (Italian: [fjumiˈtʃiːno]) is a town and comune in the Metropolitan City of Rome, Lazio, central Italy, with a population of 80,500 (2019). It is known for being the site of Leonardo da Vinci–Fiumicino Airport, the busiest airport in Italy and the eighth-busiest in Europe, which serves Rome and much of central Italy.

== Etymology ==
The name literally means little river. The town of "Fiumicino" should not be confused with like-named Fiumicino, a small river near Rimini better known as the Rubicon river.

== Recent history ==
The destroyer "Velos", in May 1973, (with a crew of 270 men in total) commanded by one of the pioneers of the movement, Admiral Nikos Pappas at the time, left the formation of vessels participating in a NATO exercise off the coast of Sardinia and rushed at the port of the city where seven officers (including the captain) and twenty-five petty officers requested political asylum from the Italian authorities, which, after many days of suffering, was granted. This went down in Greek history as the Navy Movement against the Regime of the Colonels.

Fiumicino became a comune in 1992; previously it was part of the municipality of Rome, being almost totally included in the former Municipio XIV.

On 24 August 2013, a small mud volcano popped up at the centre of the via Coccia di Morto roundabout.

== Geography ==
Located by the Tyrrhenian coast. Fiumicino borders the municipalities of Anguillara Sabazia, Cerveteri, Ladispoli and Rome. It is on the northern side of the mouth of the river Tiber, next to Ostia.

It includes the hamlets (frazioni) of Aeroporto "Leonardo da Vinci", Ara Nova (or Aranova), Casale del Castellaccio, Castel Campanile, Focene, Fregene, Isola Sacra, Le Vignole, Maccarese, Palidoro, Parco Leonardo, Passo Oscuro (or Passoscuro), Porto, Testa di Lepre, Torre in Pietra.

== Demographics ==
Historical population

| Year | Pop. | ±% |
|---|---|---|
| 1861 | - | — |
| 1871 | 3,164 | — |
| 1881 | 4,080 | +29.0% |
| 1901 | 6,291 | +54.2% |
| 1911 | 7,728 | +22.8% |
| 1921 | 9,833 | +27.2% |
| 1931 | 13,865 | +41.0% |
| 1936 | 17,136 | +23.6% |

| Year | Pop. | ±% |
|---|---|---|
| 1951 | 18,982 | +10.8% |
| 1961 | 24,115 | +27.0% |
| 1971 | 31,007 | +28.6% |
| 1981 | 34,529 | +11.4% |
| 1991 | 41,342 | +19.7% |
| 2001 | 50,535 | +22.2% |
| 2011 | 67,626 | +33.8% |
| 2021 | 80,738 | +19.4% |

Source: ISTAT

== Economy ==
Fiumicino is home to the largest airport in Italy, the Leonardo da Vinci–Fiumicino Airport, which includes the Fiumicino Aeroporto railway station.

In addition, Fiumicino has a large fishing center on the Tyrrhenian Sea coast and a sea resort.

== Education ==
The Istituto di Istruzione Superiore Leonardo da Vinci is in Fiumicino.

== Transport ==
Leonardo da Vinci-Fiumicino Airport, also known as "Rome–Fiumicino", lies in the north-eastern suburb of the town. It is served by the A91 motorway from Rome and by the Roman Suburban Railway line FL1.

The municipality contains the railway stations of Fiumicino Aeroporto and Parco Leonardo, both on the line FL1. Airport station is also served by a non-stop train from/to Roma Termini named the Leonardo Express.

The other stations within the municipality, Maccarese–Fregene and Torre in Pietra–Palidoro, are on the Rome–Pisa line. The branch line from Parco Leonardo to the town's centre, including the stations of Porto, Fiumicino and Fiumicino Porto Canale, was closed in 2000.

== People ==
- Salvo D'Acquisto (born 1920), oblatory Carabiniere
- Mauro Galvano (born 1964), boxer
- Gabriele Maruotti (born 1988), volleyball player
- Simone Tiribocchi (born 1978), football player
- Mara Sattei (born 1995), singer-songwriter
- Thasup (born 2001), rapper and record producer

== Gallery ==
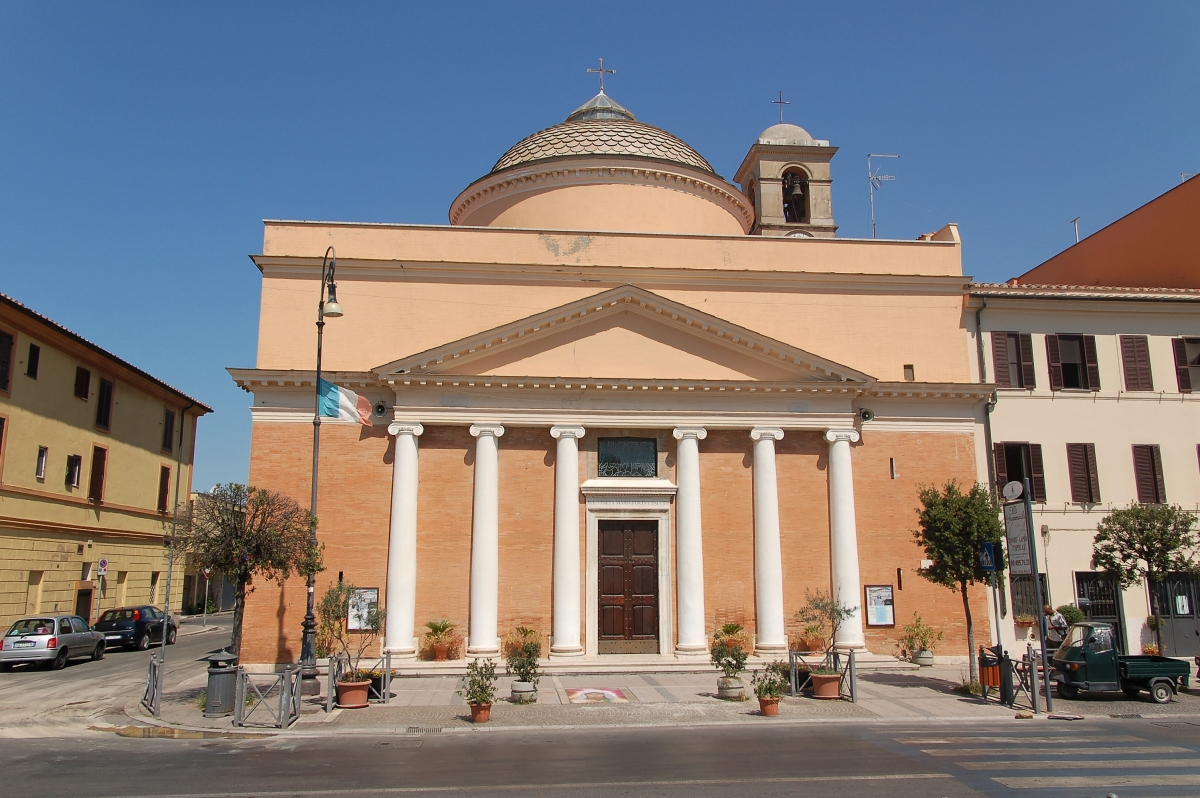
The church of Santa Maria della Salute

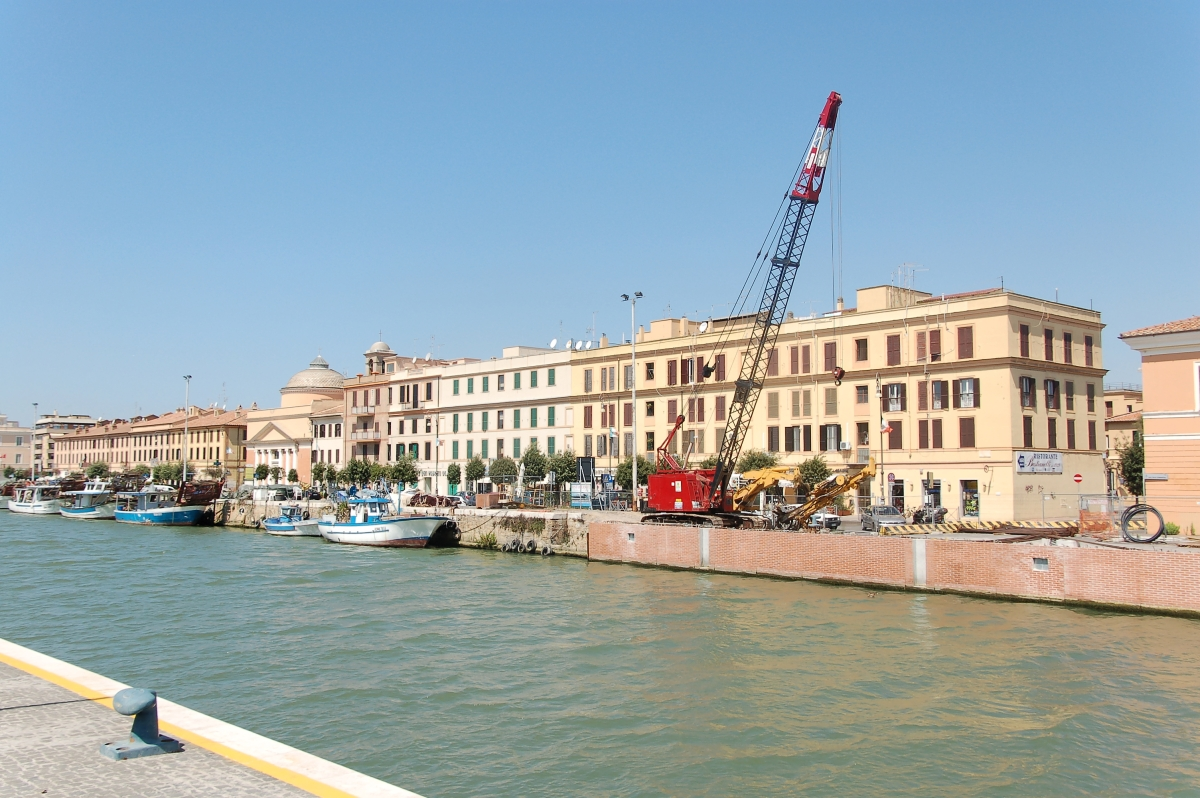
The harbor by the Tiber’s mouth

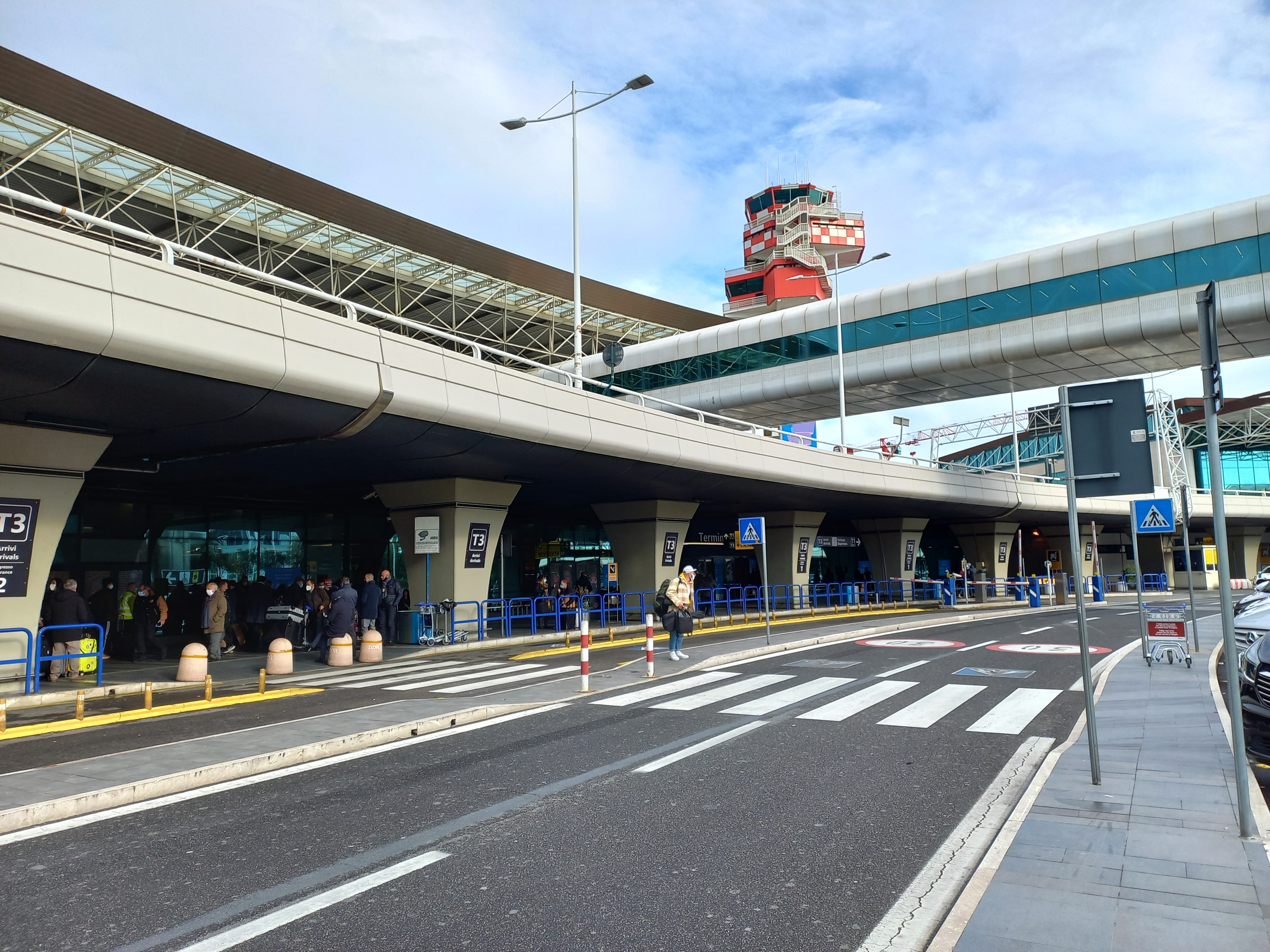
Fiumicino Airport

== See also ==
- Portus
- Isola Sacra
- 1973 Rome airport attacks and hijacking
- Rome and Vienna airport attacks
