= Lake Bracciano =

Lake in Lazio Region, Italy

Lake Bracciano Lago di Bracciano
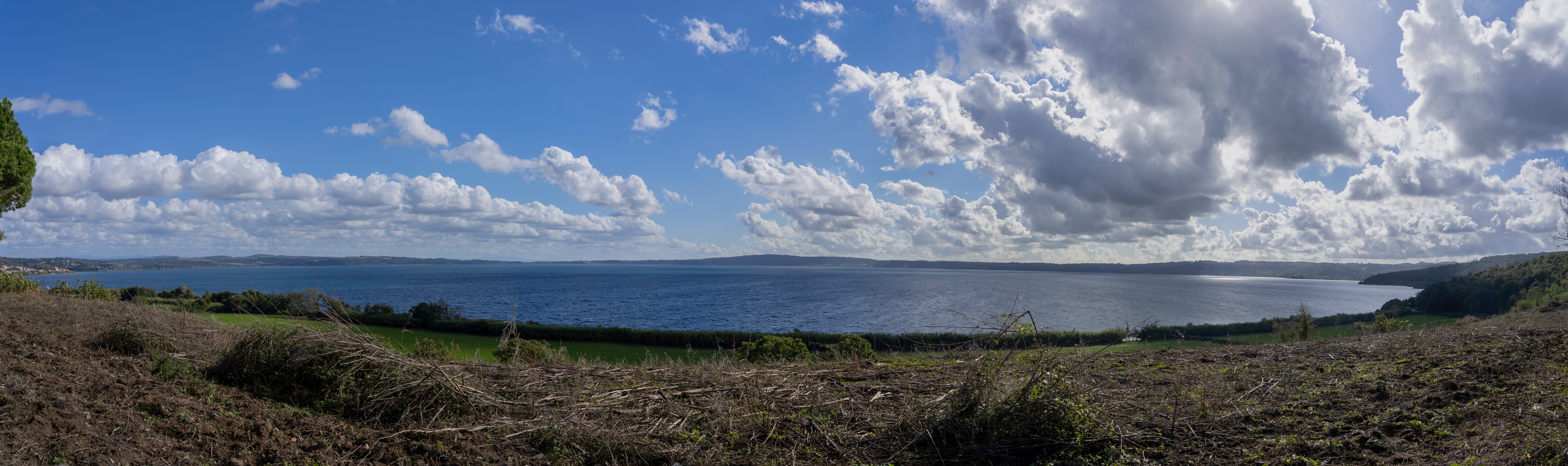
- From Castello Orsini-Odescalchi, Bracciano, in 2009

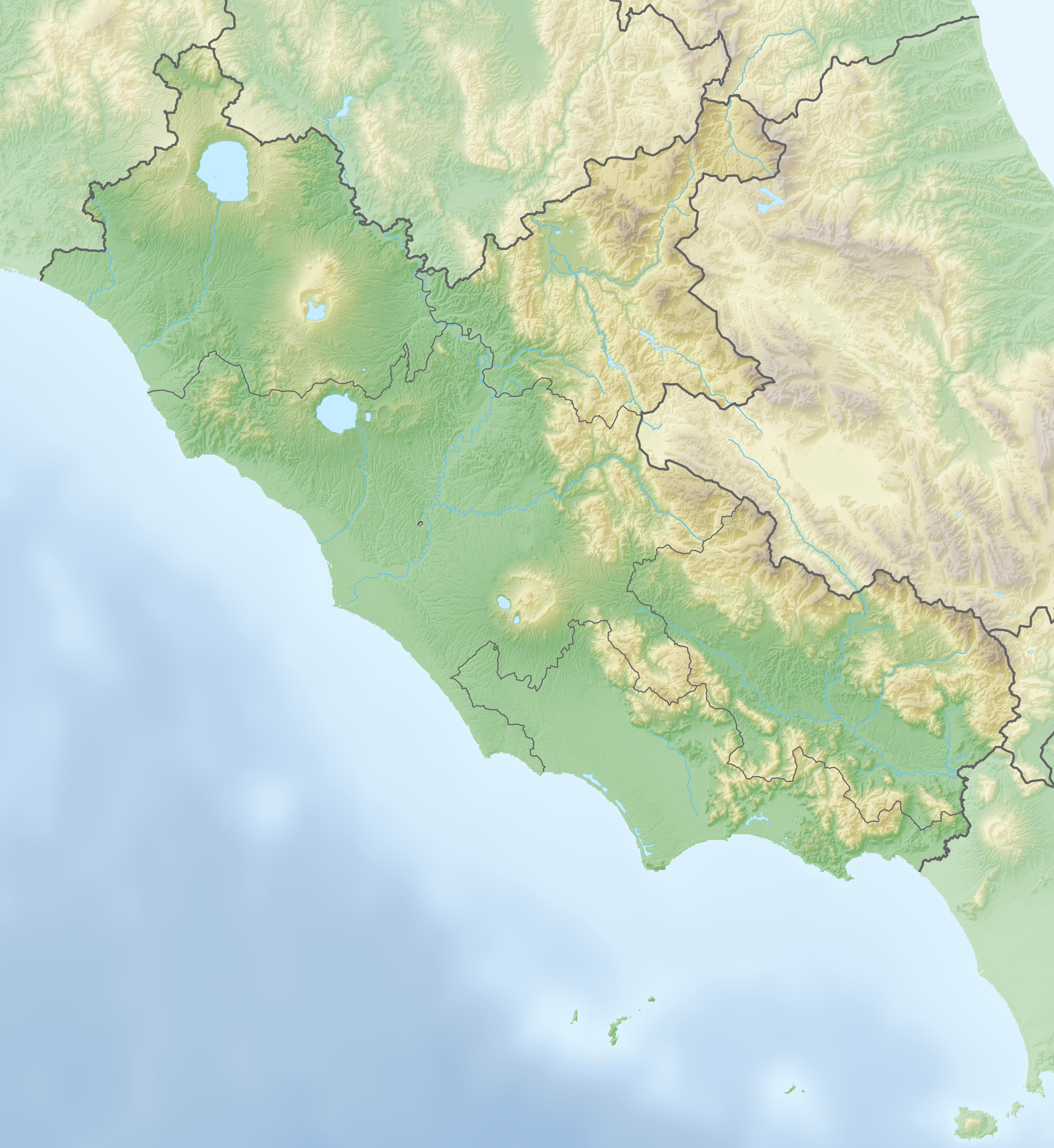
- Location within Lazio
- Location: Northern part of the Province of Rome, Lazio
- Coordinates: 42°07′16″N 12°13′55″E
- Primary outflows: Arrone
- Catchment area: 150 km^{2} (58 sq mi)
- Basin countries: Italy
- Surface area: 56.76 km^{2} (21.92 sq mi)
- Max. depth: 165 m (541 ft)
- Surface elevation: 160 m (520 ft)
- Settlements: Bracciano, Anguillara Sabazia, Trevignano Romano

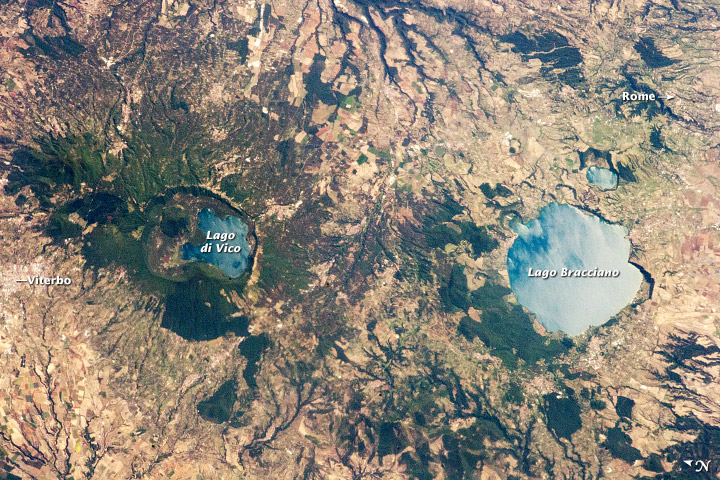
View from space of Lake Bracciano and surroundings

Lake Bracciano (Italian: Lago di Bracciano) is a lake of volcanic origin in the Italian region of Lazio, 32 km (20 mi) northwest of Rome. It is the second largest lake in the region (second only to Lake Bolsena) and one of the major lakes of Italy. It has a circular perimeter of approximately 32 km (20 mi). Its inflow is from precipitation runoff and percolation, and from underground springs, and its outflow is the Arrone.

The lake owes its origin to intense volcanic and tectonic activity from 600,000 to 40,000 years ago, which created many small volcanoes in the Sabatino territory. The main magma chamber was situated under the present lake of Bracciano. Its collapse created the depressed area now occupied by the lake, which is not a crater lake. Some small craters and calderas are still recognisable around the lake and in the immediate vicinity (Martignano, Baccano, Sacrofano).

Three towns border the lake, Bracciano, Anguillara Sabazia and Trevignano Romano.

The lake is an important tourist attraction. As it serves as a drinking water reservoir for the city of Rome, it has been under control since 1986 in order to avoid pollution of its waters. The use of motorboats is strictly forbidden (exceptions being made for a few professional fishermen and the authorities), and a centralised sewer system has been built for all the bordering towns in order to avoid any spoiling of the water quality, making Bracciano one of the cleanest lakes in Italy. The absence of motorized navigation favours sailing, canoeing and swimming.

In the last few years, the lake and its surroundings have been brought under further protection by the creation of a regional park, the Parco Regionale del complesso lacuale di Bracciano Martignano.

Water from the hills above the lake was transported to Rome by the Aqua Traiana, dedicated in 109 CE. The aqueduct was restored in the early 17th century by Pope Paul V, taking water to the Trastevere area of Rome and (via the Ponte Sisto) to the Rione of Regola.

== History ==
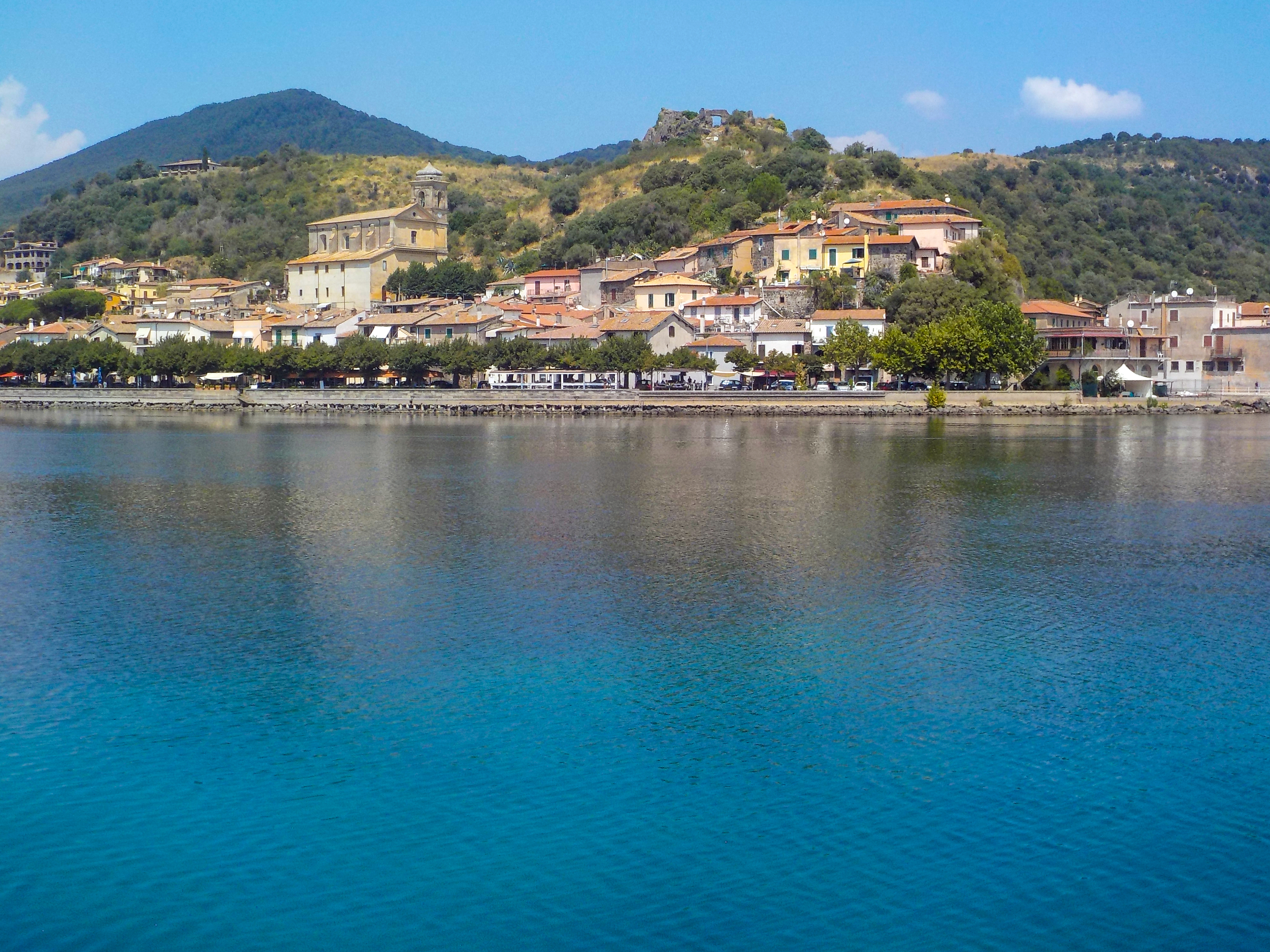
Trevignano Romano seen from the lake

=== La Marmotta Neolithic settlement ===
At La Marmotta, a few hundred meters outside the village of Anguillara Sabazia, remains of an Early Neolithic lakeshore village, dated to 5700 BC have been found, in works overseen by Maria Antonietta Fugazzola Delpino, director of the Pigorini National Museum of Prehistory and Ethnography in Rome, and president of the Italian Institute of Prehistory and Protohistory. Thick oak pilings driven more than two meters into the subsoil have survived, thanks to anoxic lake-bottom sediments; dendrochronology dates the settlement very accurately, for local tree-ring sequences have already been thoroughly established. The oldest post-Fugazzola Delpino has discovered at La Marmotta dates from around 5,690 BC, but she thinks ongoing work may yet reveal the village to have been born a century or so earlier. She is more certain of when it died: within a decade or so of 5230 BC. "Since the sixth millennium BC, as the climate has grown wetter, the water level in Lake Bracciano has risen more than 25 feet (8 m), and so the ruins of the Neolithic lakeshore village are now buried in bottom mud 400 yards (370 m) offshore".

The strongest evidence that the Marmottans came from far away, probably originally making their way along the Arrone to its source in Lake Bracciano, is simply that their culture was advanced. In the region around Lake Bracciano, according to Fugazzola Delpino, there is no sign of any but hunter-gatherers before the settlement was built at La Marmotta. The builders of the village had at their disposal, from the start, the entire "Neolithic package": domesticated animals and plants, ceramic pots, polished stone tools, just as though they had unloaded all those things from their boats.

They kept sheep and goats; they brought pigs and cows with them too, and two breeds of dog, and they planted a wide variety of crops— wheat and barley — and collected others in the woods. "They had everything", says Fugazzola, "They ate grains, vegetables, and also lots of fruit – apples, plums, raspberries, strawberries" Especially in winter they supplemented their diet with acorns, which they stored in large ceramic jars. They cultivated flax to make linen. They planted opium poppies" One of their boats has been recovered. A team of Czech archaeologists built a copy of the boat and sailed it 500 miles (800 km) along the Mediterranean coast to test its seaworthiness.

=== Roman Era ===
The area around the lake was always sparsely populated, but by the late Republic many waterfront villas had been built. The rich volcanic soil and the beautiful environment and views attracted rich patricians from Rome to build elaborate villae rusticae. Among these, Domitian's villa with thermal spa at Vicarello was the ultimate example.

However around the mid-1st century AD an environmental disaster occurred; the lake's water level rose, flooding the shore and many of the villas there more or less permanently.

=== Modern Era ===
There is a military base along the lake south of Bracciano.

=== Legends ===
The lake was originally known as "Lake Sabatine," named after the adjacent Sabatine Mountains and the ancient volcanic system in the area. It is believed that a prosperous city called "Sabate" once stood nearby.

In the period between the 16th and 17th centuries, a German historian and geographer documented in "Italia Antiqua" that the lake's calm waters occasionally revealed the submerged outlines of statues and edifices.

Legend has it that Sabate was a flourishing city whose residents, however, strayed from ethical principles. In response, a deity unleashed a devastating catastrophe that obliterated the city, sparing only a virtuous young woman. She was instructed by the deity to flee and not look back. Pausing to rest where the small church of St. Maria del Riposo would later be built, the woman eventually glanced back towards Sabate. However, in place of the city, she saw a vast lake, which came to be known as Lake Sabatine or Lago di Bracciano (Lake Bracciano.)

== See also ==
- Italian Air Force Museum
