= Agostino Lamma =

Italian painter (1636–1700)

Agostino Lamma (1636–1700) was an Italian painter, active in Venice and specializing in battle paintings. He was trained under Antonio Calza, and his Siege of Vienna by the Turks, painted in the style of Mattias Stom. He died in Venice.
