= Le Vignole =

- Frazione
- Location of Le Vignole in Italy
- Coordinates: 41°48′35″N 12°18′23″E
- Country: Italy
- Region: Lazio
- Metropolitan city: Metropolitan City of Rome Capital (RM)
- Comune: Fiumicino

Population (2011)
  - Total: 658
- Time zone: UTC+1 (CET)
  - Summer (DST): UTC+2 (CEST)

Le Vignole is a frazione located within the comune of Fiumicino, itself located within the Metropolitan City of Rome. It forms part of the hinterland of Rome.

== Transport ==
The frazione can be reached from Via Portuense, the autostada A91 highway that connects Rome with Leonardo da Vinci–Fiumicino Airport, or via the FL1 Parco Leonardo station.
