= Francesco Capella =

Italian painter

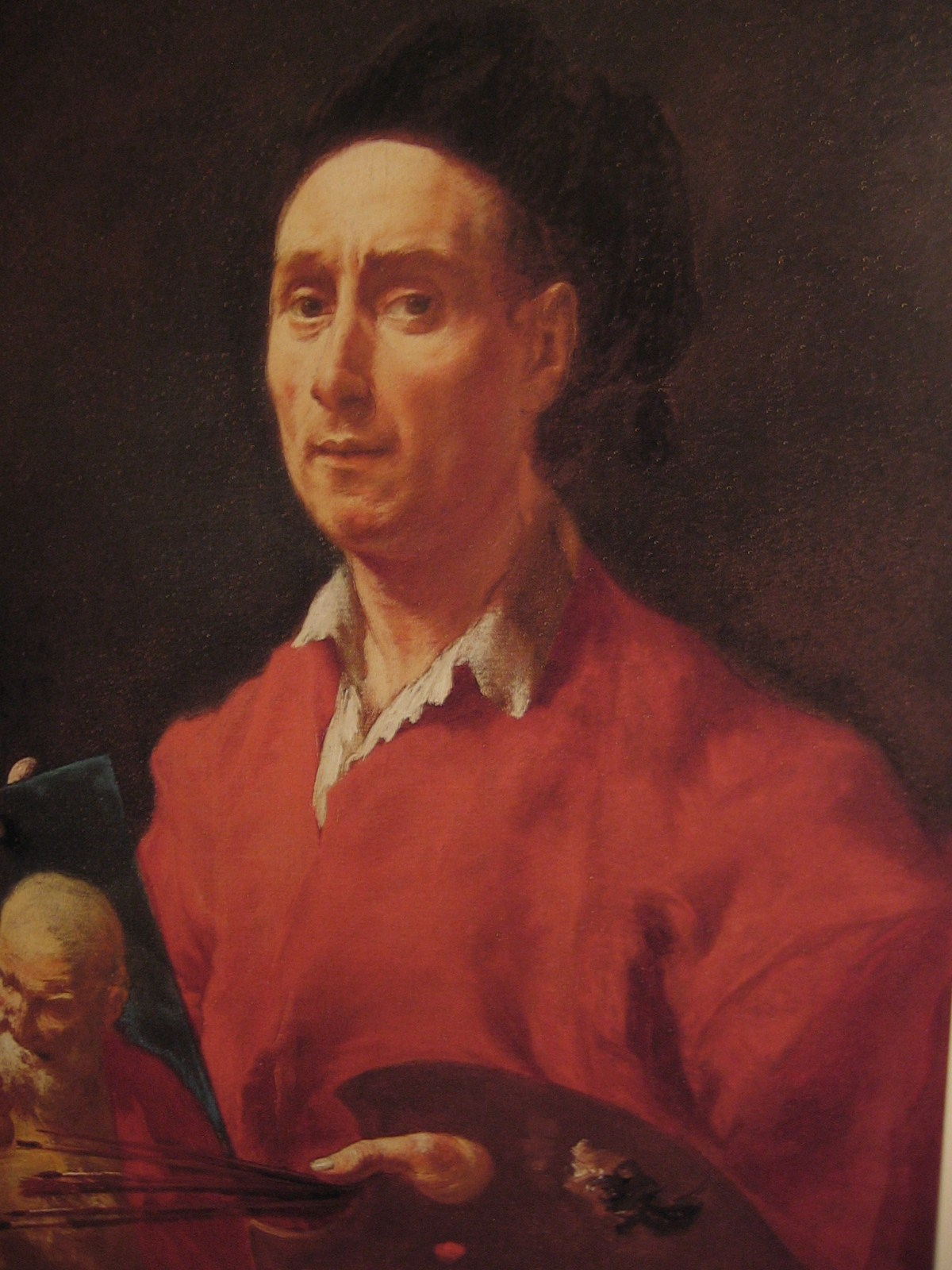
Self portrait, now at the Accademia Carrara in Bergamo

Francesco Capella (1714–1784), called Il Capella and Francesco Dagiu, was a student of Giovanni Battista Piazzetta. He was born in Venice, Italy. He painted history, and was chiefly employed for the churches at Bergamo, and by the state. One of his best pictures is 'St. George and the Dragon,' in the church of San Bonate.

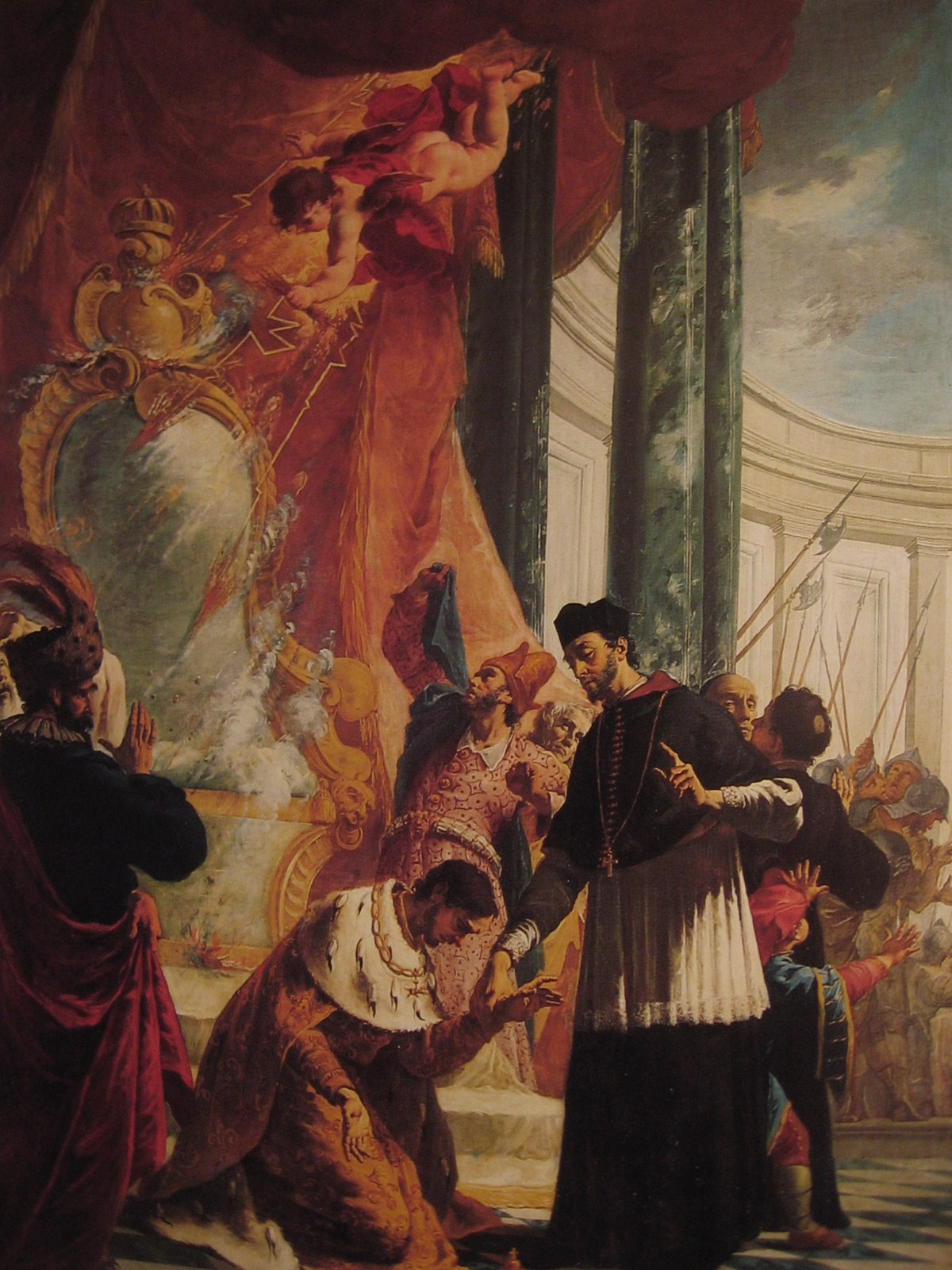
Emperor Valentianus in front of Saint Martin, Church of San Martino, Sarnico, Bergamo
