= Eurosia =

Christian saint

Saint Eurosia
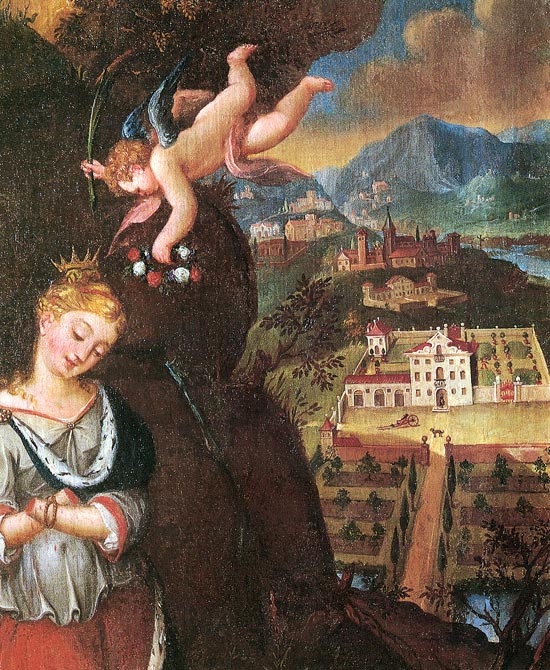
- Image of Saint Eurosia, whose hands have been cut off, Colle Umberto, Italy, 17th century.

Martyr
- Born: 864
- Died: 880 AD
- Venerated in: Catholic Church, Eastern Orthodox Church
- Canonized: Cultus confirmed in 1902 by Pope Leo XIII
- Major shrine: Jaca
- Feast: 25 June

Eurosia (or Orosia) is the patron saint of Jaca, a city in the province of Huesca of northeastern Spain, in the Pyrenees, the centre of her cult.

== In Spain ==
The "Fiesta de Santa Orosia" is celebrated on 25 June. Tradition states that she was born in Bayonne (or perhaps Bohemia) and died in 880, martyred by the Moors at Jaca.

Her legend states that she was of noble birth and promised to a Moor in an arranged marriage. Eurosia escaped and hid in a cave. Unfortunately, the smoke from her fire led to her capture. She was dragged from the cave by her hair and martyred. Devotion to St. Eurosia spread into northern Italy during the Middle Ages.

== Eurosia as Bohemian princess ==
According to an alternate tradition, she was born Dobroslava into the ducal family of Bohemia in 864. When orphaned, Dobroslava was adopted by the succeeding duke, Borivoj I. Borivoj's wife was Saint Ludmila, who converted her adoptive daughter to the Christian faith. Borivoj was deposed by pagans, but restored thanks to the efforts of Saint Methodius. In 880, Methodius was ordered by Pope John VIII to find a worthy spouse for the son of the king of Pamplona, Prince Fortún; this son was heir to the throne of Aragon and Navarre, and would be a critical player in the fight against the Moors in Spain.

Eurosia, now sixteen years old, was considered a good candidate and was brought to Spain in 880. As she crossed the Pyrenees, she planned to meet her future spouse at Jaca. However, this area had become a war zone. A Moorish captain named Aben Lupo planned to wed Eurosia for himself and attacked the Bohemian party. However, thanks to the bravery of Eurosia's escort, the young bride-to-be managed to escape through the mountains. She was pursued and eventually caught. Eurosia invoked the heavens and a lightning bolt hit the ground near her captors. She was quickly executed, her limbs were amputated and she was beheaded. After she was beheaded, a storm came, terrorizing her tormentors.

== Veneration ==
A shepherd of Yebra de Basa is said to have discovered her relics in the 11th century thanks to an apparition of the Virgin Mary that identified their resting place. Her head remained at the original simple shrine, while Sancho Ramírez, recognizing the importance of Eurosia's relics, brought her body to Jaca, which he had designated the capital of his kingdom of Aragon. Drawing pilgrims to his city, he shifted the traditional route of the Way of St. James, which had followed the Roman military route of the Puerto del Palo by the Monastery of San Pedro de Siresa to Berdún. He established a route through Somport and Jaca, to bring traffic through his city, reinforced by publicized miracles at the urban shrine that was now on the direct route of the Camino de Santiago.

There is a chapel dedicated to her in La Seo Cathedral, Zaragoza.

Her cult spread throughout Béarn and northern Italy thanks to the subsequent campaigns of the Spanish realm in those regions.

It is unclear when Eurosia became patroness of the demonically possessed. Until 1947, when the bishop of Jaca prohibited the practice, those who were afflicted with possession were brought together in a procession and followed an urn carrying her relics.
