= Anguillara Sabazia =

- Comune
- Comune di Anguillara Sabazia
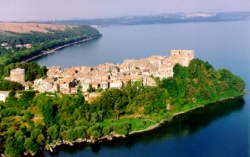
- View of Anguillara Sabazia on Lake Bracciano.

- Location of Anguillara Sabazia in Lazio Anguillara Sabazia (Italy) Anguillara Sabazia (European Union)
- Coordinates: 42°5′N 12°16′E
- Country: Italy
- Region: Lazio
- Metropolitan city: Rome (RM)
- Frazioni: Fonte Claudia, Stazione, Ponton dell'Elce

Area
  - Total: 75.24 km^{2} (29.05 sq mi)
- Elevation: 195 m (640 ft)

Population (31 October 2021)
  - Total: 18 997
- Demonyms: Anguillarini
- Time zone: UTC+1 (CET)
  - Summer (DST): UTC+2 (CEST)
- Patron saint: St. Blaise
- Website: Official website

Anguillara Sabazia is a town and comune in the Metropolitan City of Rome, Lazio, central Italy, around 30 kilometres (19 mi) northwest of Rome. It nestles on a small cape on the coast of Lake Bracciano; its medieval center and its beach make it a popular destination for tourists.

About 3 kilometres (1.9 mi) east of the town lies the small, volcanic Lake Martignano, also popular with tourists. The two lakes and the surrounding area have been declared a Regional Park and are under a strict naturalistic control.

Nearby at Mura di Santo Stefano about 3 km south of Lake Bracciano lie the remarkable remains of a great ancient Roman villa.

== Roman villa of Mura di Santo Stefano ==
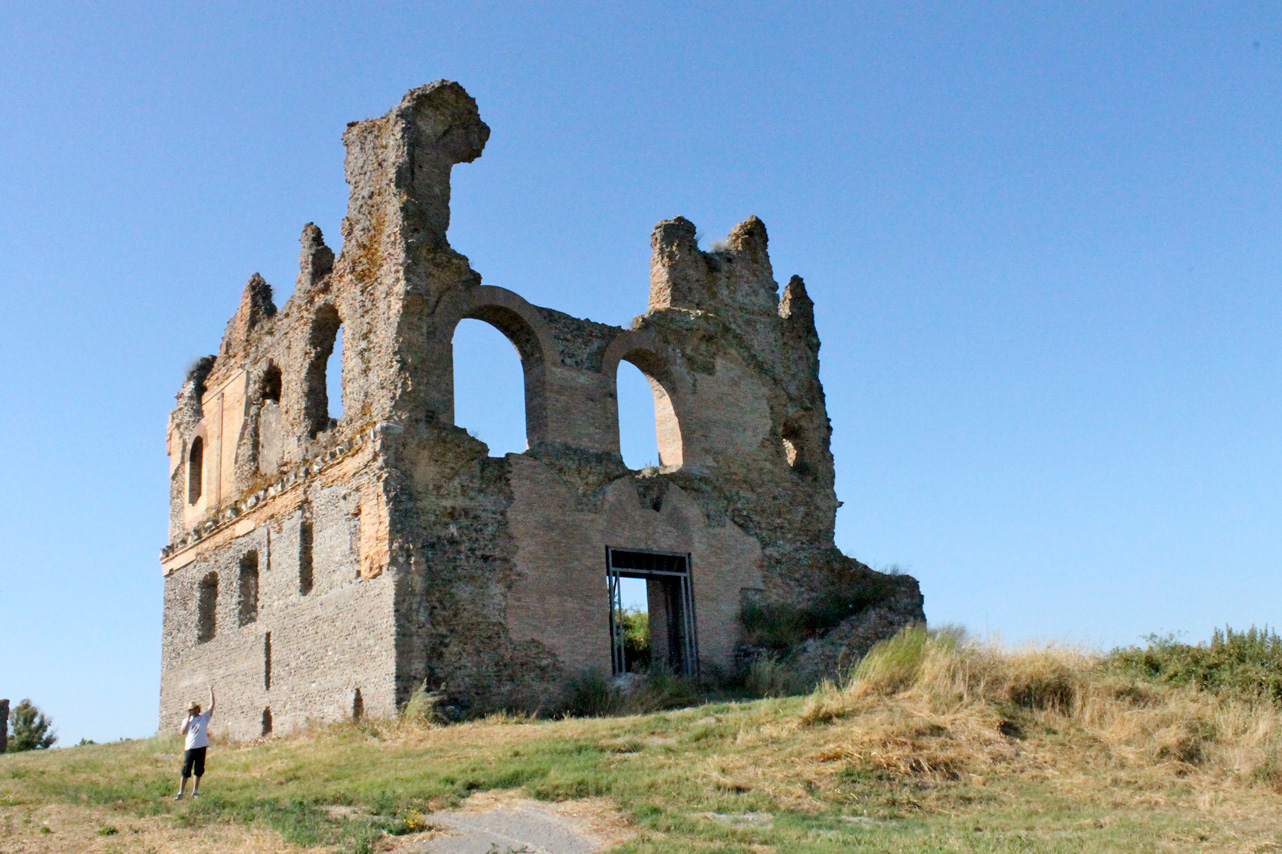
Roman villa

It was located along the Via Clodia and was built at the end of the 2nd century AD, probably on an earlier villa rustica of the 1st century. The complex was a luxury retreat, possibly the residential part of a latifundium. There is evidence for continuing activity till the 3d or early 4th century.

The remains of the three-story building in cement with brick cladding are still preserved to about 18 m in height. There are arched openings towards the outside framed by pillars of yellow and red bricks. Inside the building has a central courtyard with pillars and three floors with cross vaults which have now disappeared. It was lavishly decorated with 19 types of marble. The covered side corridors retain traces of marble cladding on the walls.

A cistern is also preserved nearby.

== Popular culture ==
The Everybody Loves Raymond fifth season two-part episode "Italy" was filmed in Anguillara Sabazia.
