= Ostia (Rome) =

- Frazione
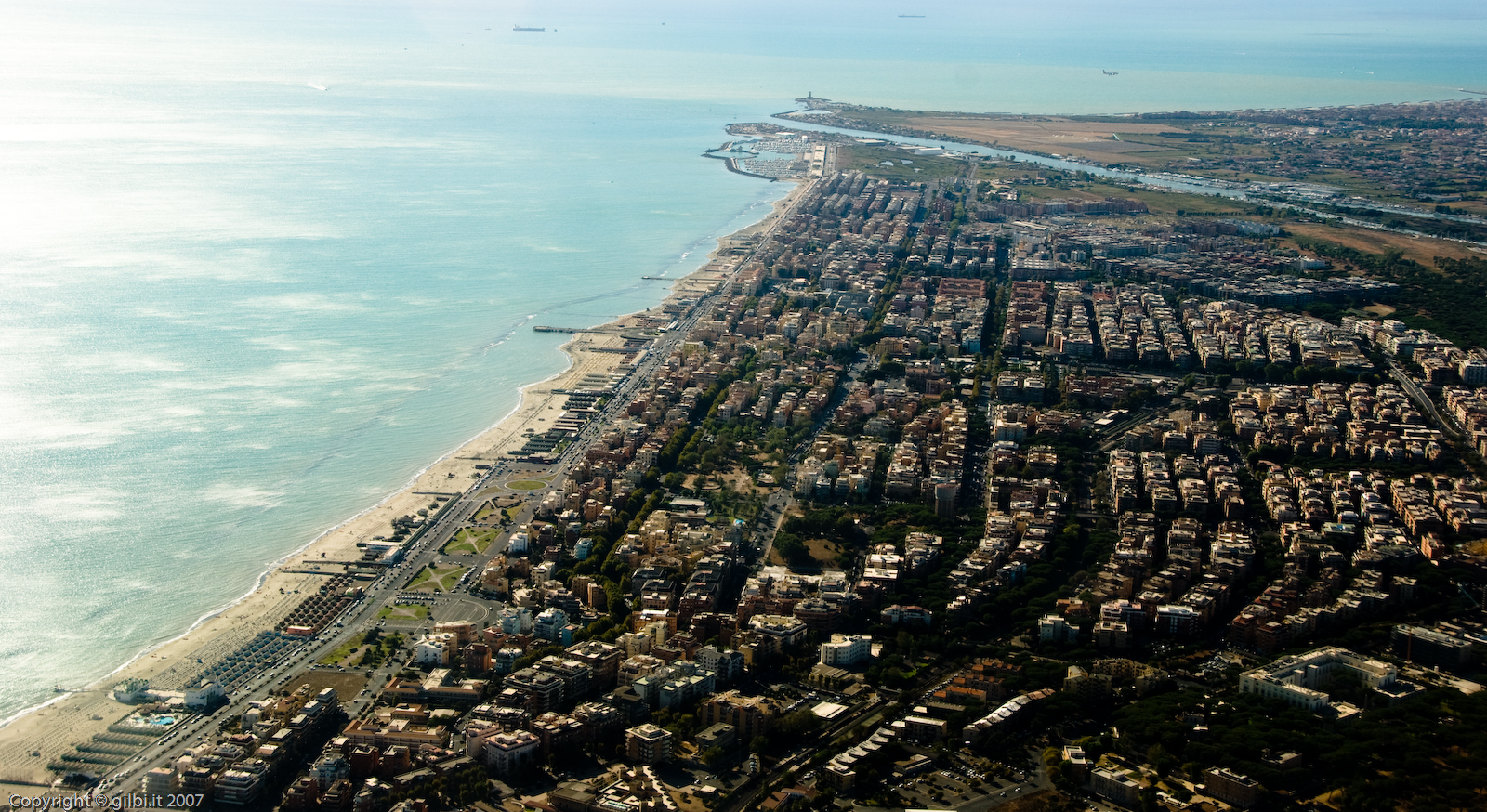
- Aerial view of Ostia, with the Tiber and its mouth in the background
- Interactive map of Ostia
- Location of Ostia in Italy
- Country: Italy
- Region: Lazio
- Province: Metropolitan City of Rome Capital
- Comune: Rome
- Elevation: 5 m (16 ft)

Population (2022)
  - Total: 91,342
- Demonym: Lidensi/Ostiensi
- Time zone: UTC+1 (CET)
  - Summer (DST): UTC+2 (CEST)
- Postal code: 00121–00122
- Dialing code: 06

Ostia (/ˈɒstiə/, Italian: [ˈɔstja]), officially Lido di Ostia, is a large neighbourhood in the Municipio X of the comune of Rome, Italy, near the ancient port of Rome, which is now a major archaeological site known as Ostia Antica. Ostia is also the only municipio or district of Rome on the Tyrrhenian Sea, and many Romans spend the summer holidays there. It is entirely situated within the municipality of Rome and is the city's seaside resort.

Ostia was the port city of ancient Rome; it had a strategic function for trade, especially for the supply of grain, and as the main base of the Roman navy. It had a fundamental function during the Punic Wars, and after the final destruction of Carthage, and the end of Macedon's independence; by the latter half of the 2nd century BC, Roman control over all of what was later to be dubbed Mare Nostrum ("our sea") had been established.

The ancient city of Ostia stood in a strategic point near the mouth of the Tiber and the sea, which at the time was closer to the city. The modern seaside resort, Lido di Ostia, is in fact located about 5 km (3 miles) south-west of the ancient city and about 28 km from the center of Rome (17.4 miles).

== Etymology ==
The name of Ostia is derived from the Latin ostia, in turn plural of the neuter ostium i.e. 'mouth', or alternatively 'door, entrance'. The current placename is a reference to the original settlement in the eighth century BC at the mouth of the river Tiber and precisely called Ostia Tiberina.

== History ==
=== Ancient Rome ===
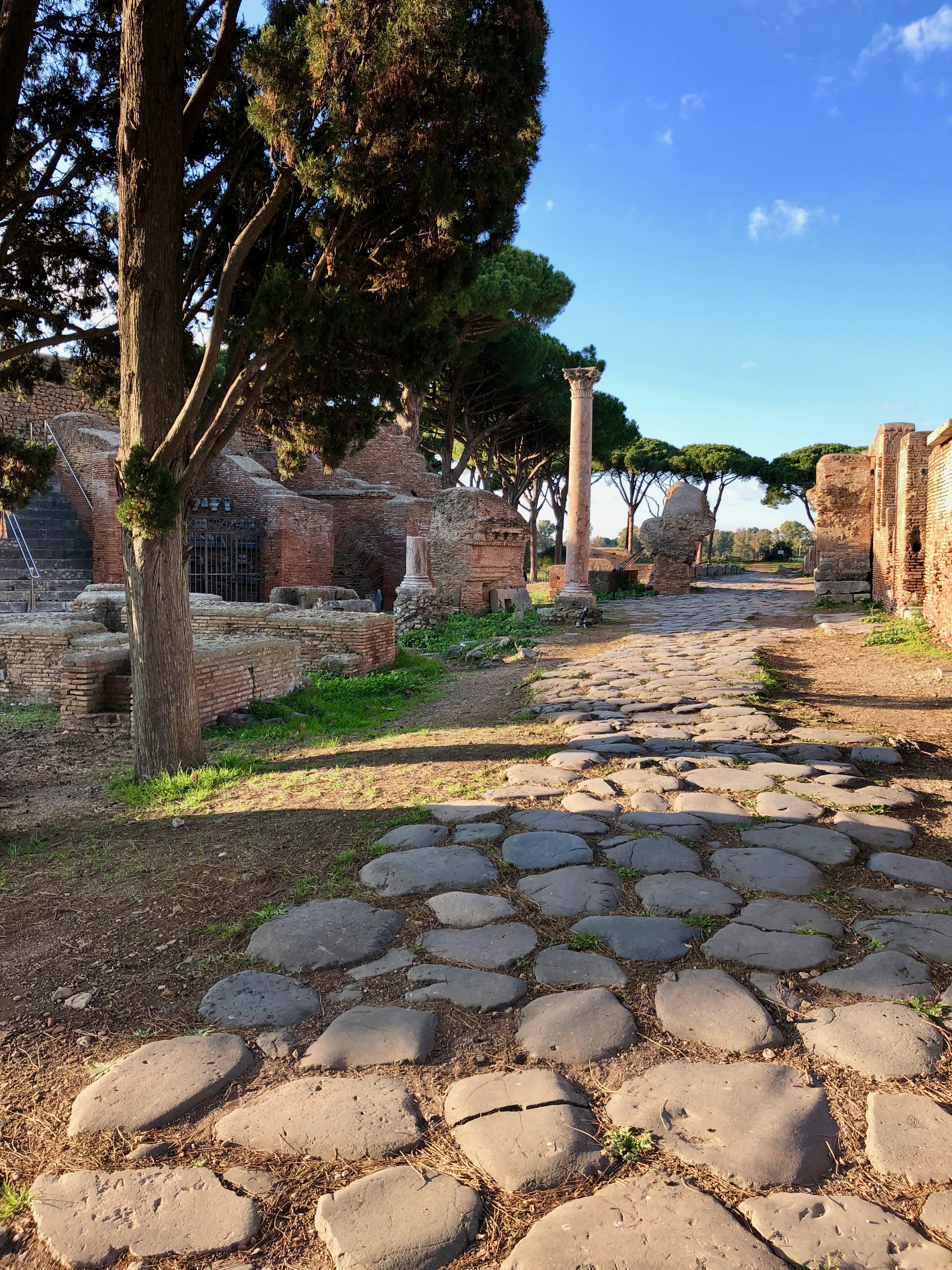
Ancient Main Road, Ostia Antica

The settlement of Ostia, according to tradition, was built under the reign of the fourth king of Rome Ancus Marcius, around 630 BC, as the first official Roman colonia on the then coastline of the Tyrrhenian Sea and near the mouth of the Tiber river. Ostia Antica was the port city of ancient Rome, and is often referenced in writings from the times of the Roman Republic and the Roman Empire. It was the main port of Republican Rome; the main function of Ostia was that of supplying salt and grain although the archaeological site suggests that it had, in the beginning, an important military function as the base of the first Roman fleets. Proof of its importance is the exemption from military conscription during the Second Punic War. Later the port, partially blocked by a sandbank, became unsuitable for large ships and was replaced by the hexagonal port of Trajan.

=== Middle Ages ===
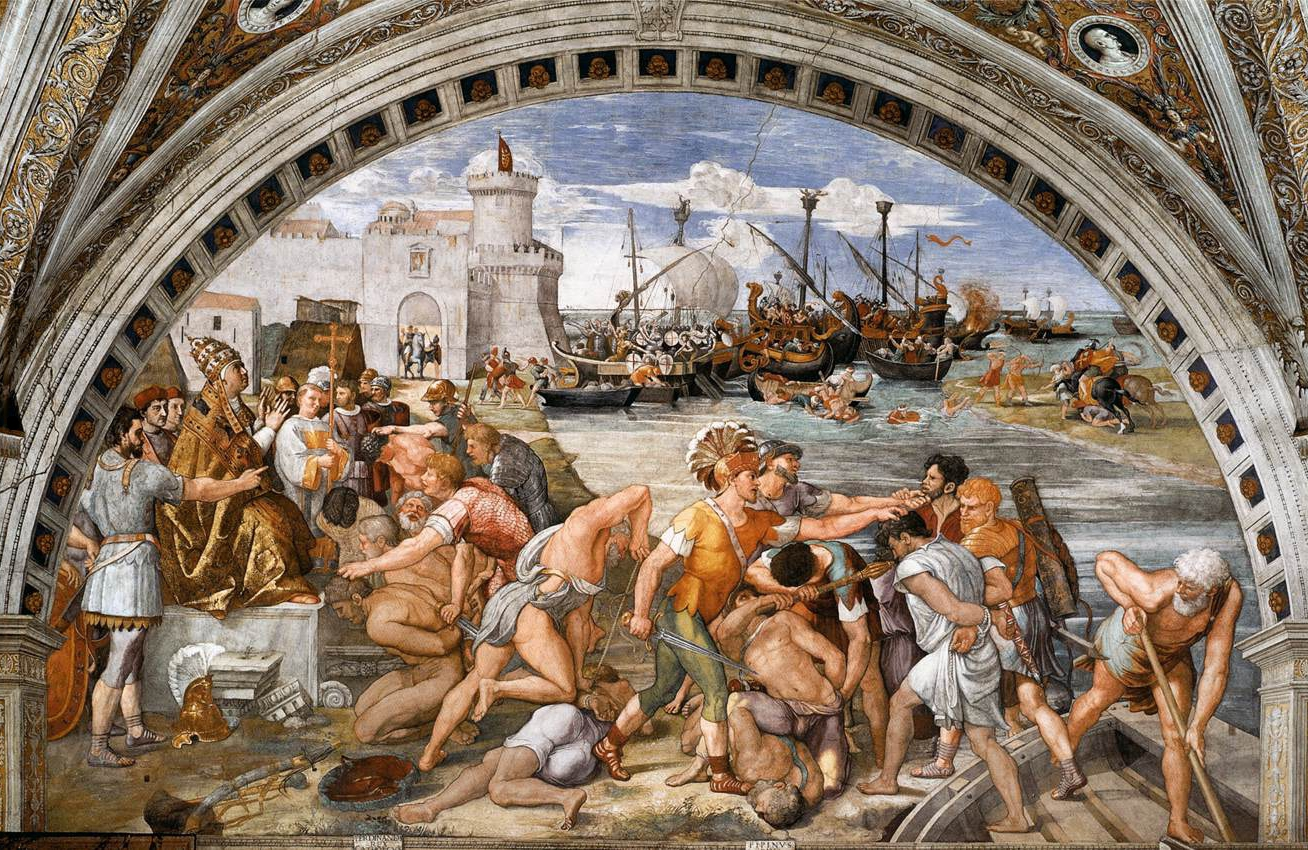
Battle of Ostia 1514–1515, Raphael, Vatican Museums

Already since the 3rd century it was the seat of the bishop of Ostia. Ostia Antica was especially important as the site of the death of Saint Monica (mother of Saint Augustine) in 387 in a house property of the Diocesi of Rome, on their way back to Africa after Augustine's conversion to Christianity.

Given the important position at the mouth of the Tiber, Cardinal Giuliano della Rovere ordered the construction of a fortress to defend the river to stem pirate raids; however, a major flood in 1557 diverted the course of the river, nullifying the strategic function of the fort, which was supplanted by Tor San Michele and Tor Boacciana.

=== Modern and contemporary age ===
An important stand in Italian nationalism of the 19th century was a veneration for the glories of the Roman past, manifested in a wish to revive or recreate various places and institutions connected with Ancient Rome. In 1871, the city of Rome became the capital of the new Kingdom of Italy. A recreation of Ostia was an obvious additional step.

The modern neighbourhood of Ostia was founded in 1884, near the remains of Ostia Antica. This was possible after reclamation of the nearby marshland, which was infested by malarial mosquitos. The first inhabitants were laborers from Ravenna, in Romagna, who took care of the reclamation of the entire area. Due to the opening of the urban Roma–Ostia railway in 1924, the new village soon became the favourite sea resort of the Romans, while many Art Nouveau houses were built on the waterfront.

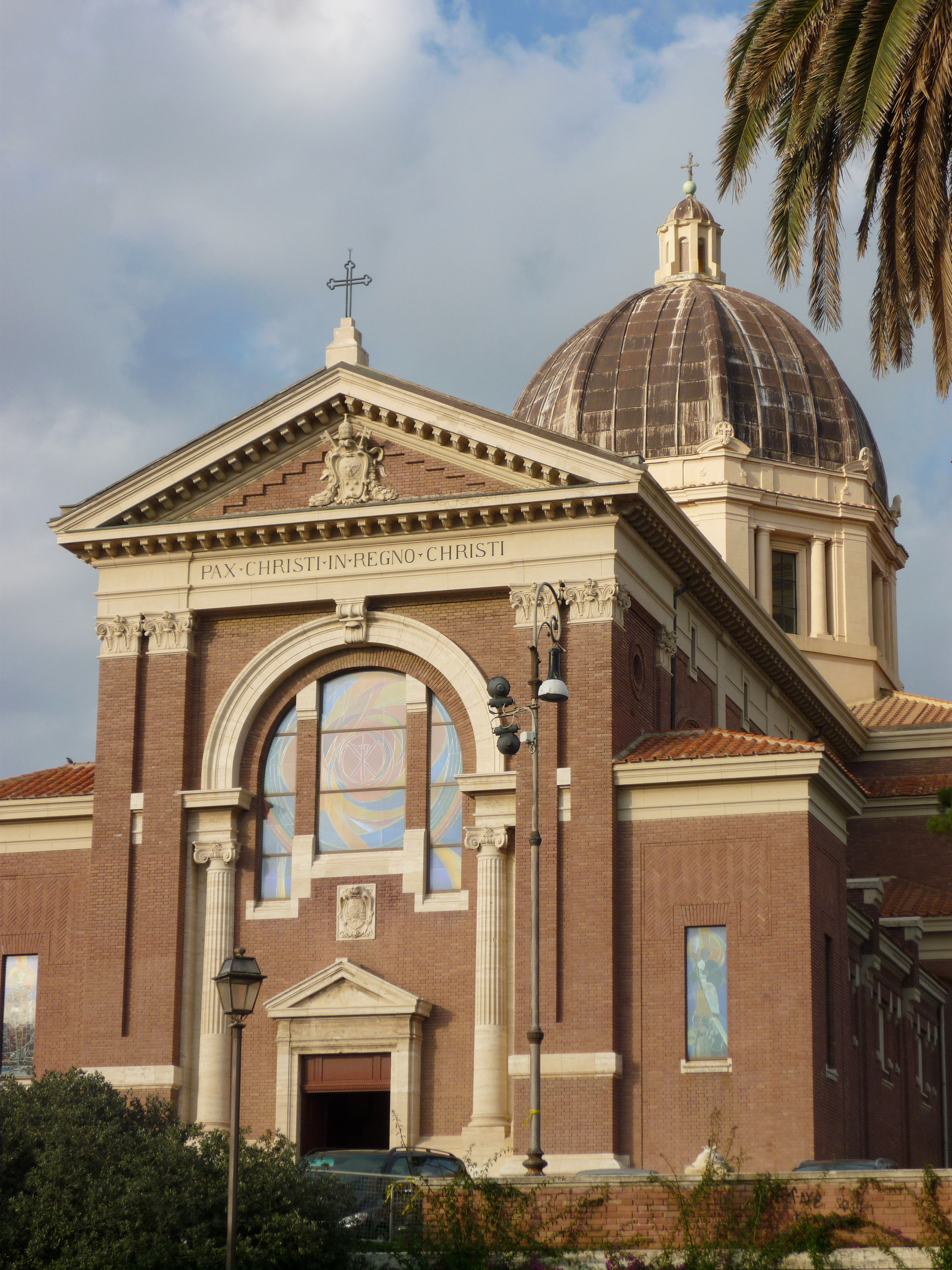
The neo-baroque church of Santa Maria Regina Pacis a Ostia Lido

The new village was connected to central Rome through the new Via Ostiense, which was opened in 1907. During the Fascist period, the government massively expanded the neighbourhood, which got its ultimate architectural character due to many new buildings in Stile Littorio. The neighborhood was planned, and partially built, according to the urban planning criteria in force at the time and the stylistic themes of Italian rationalism. New infrastructure, such as a second road to Rome (Via del Mare'), the promenade, and a water airport, were all built during this period. The "Roma bathing establishment" built in 1924 and destroyed by the Axis powers retreating from Rome in 1943, became an emblematic symbol of the Roman coast.

The new Via Cristoforo Colombo was built on the occasion of the 1942 universal exhibition, to connect the EUR district to Ostia and the center of Rome.

Beginning in the early 20th century, in response to the new, modern and dynamic society that characterized Europe at the time and the emergence of new lifestyles, such as the distinction between work and leisure, more and more bathing establishments were built. Ostia experienced rapid population and tourist growth, becoming Rome's seaside resort.

Italian intellectual, film director and poet Pier Paolo Pasolini was assassinated near the water aerodrome on 2 November 1975.

In 1976, Ostia became part of the X Municipio of the comune of Rome. Nowadays, due to the expansion of the city, only the Park of Castelfusano separates Ostia from the other quarters of Rome.

== Places of interest ==
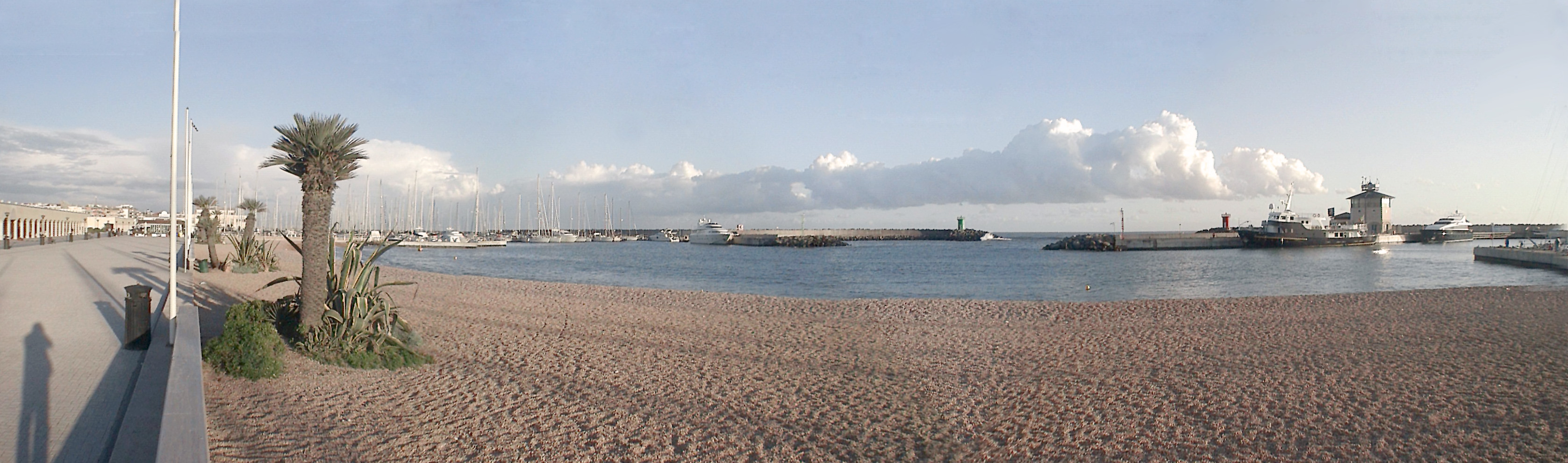
Marina of Rome

The Ostia quarter is an active seaside resort, equipped with beaches, dedicated facilities, restaurants, hotels and points of interest. It is known and famous, as it was at its origins when it was completely regenerated during the fascist period, as the "Sea of Rome", and consequently has become one of the most populous and sought-after neighborhoods in Rome.

The main (and often crowded) free beaches of Ostia extend in the southern area, protected with dunes and rich in Mediterranean flora.

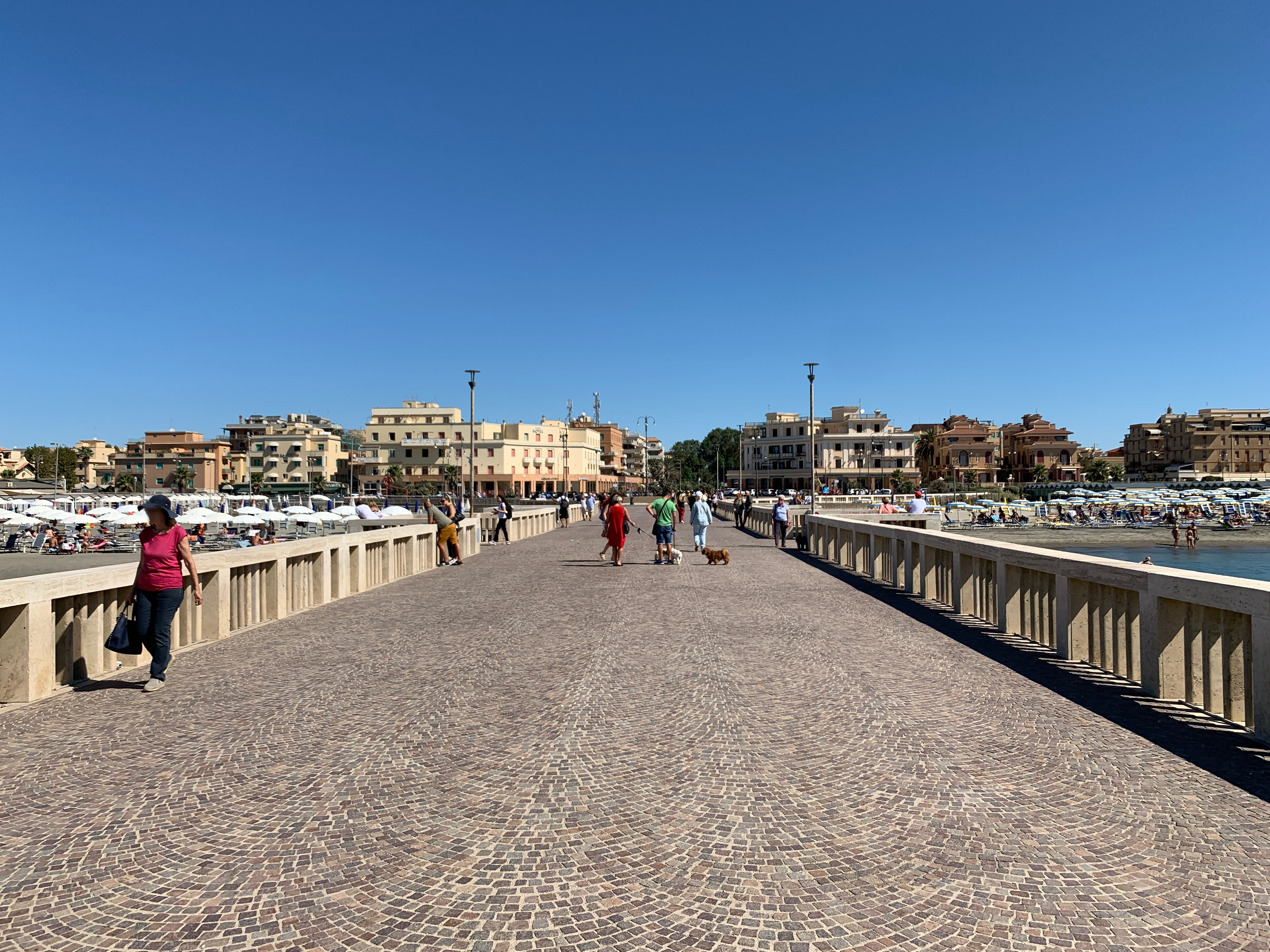
Pontile di Ostia

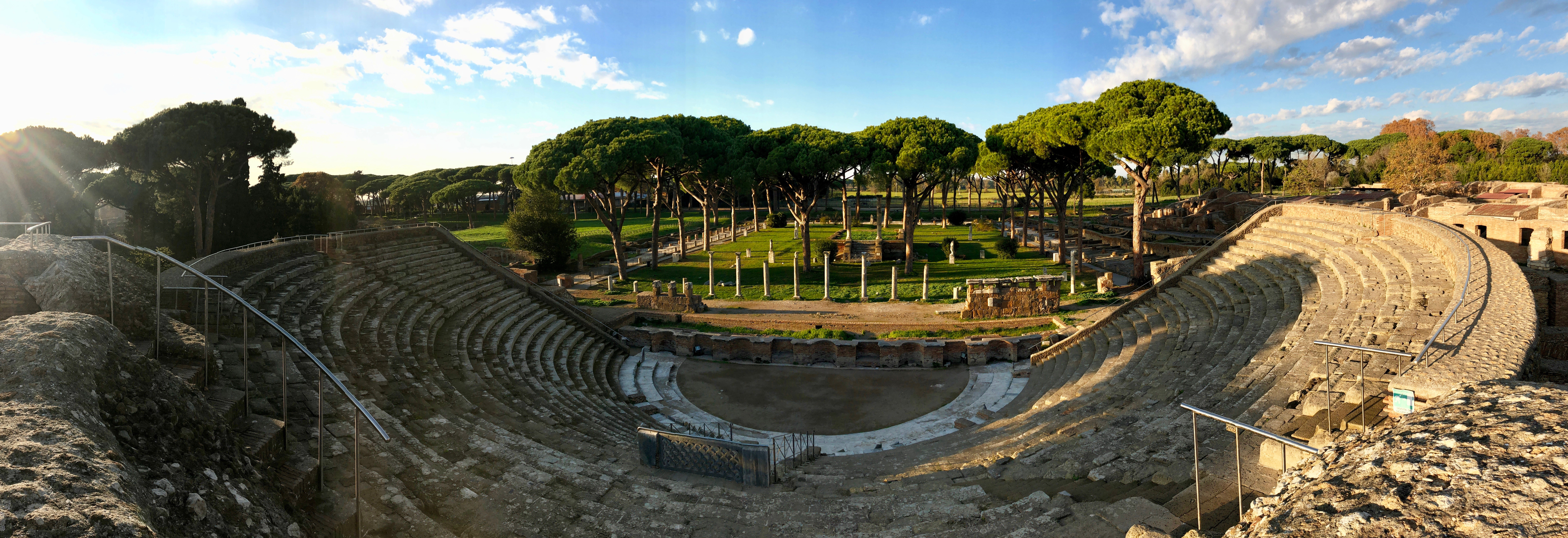
Amphitheatre and Market Square, Ostia Antica

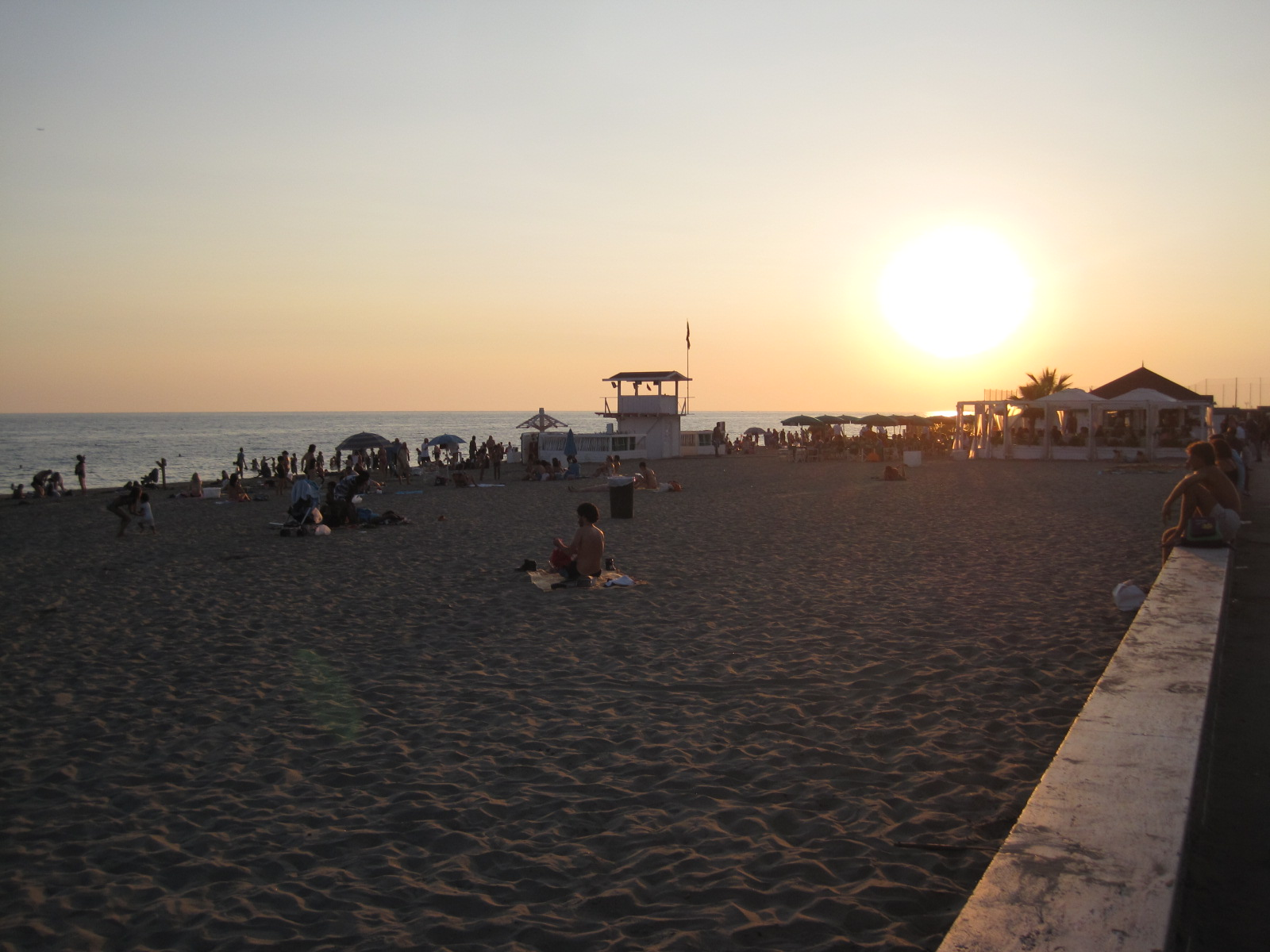
A beach in Ostia

- Marina of Rome, between the Duca degli Abruzzi seafront and via dell'Idroscalo. It is a tourist port, with more than 800 yachts, and various shops, restaurants, and walking spaces in addition to shipyards
- Ostia Antica archaeological site, the port city of ancient Rome. With an area of 150 hectares, it is the largest archaeological park in the world. Only 40% of the excavations have been completed, and more than half of the ancient city is still buried. In 2019, it received the European Heritage Label
- Burg of Ostia Antica
- Pontile di Ostia, a terraced platform on the Roman coast, with a panoramic view of the sea
- Borghetto dei Pescatori

=== Buildings ===
- Santa Maria Regina Pacis a Ostia Lido
- Santa Monica di Ostia
- Tor San Michele
- Villa Sacchetti at Castelfusano

=== Parks ===
- Centro Habitat Mediterraneo
- Castelfusano
- Capocotta beach, part of the Litorale Romano State Nature Reserve
- Zoomarine, zoological and amusement park, located in Torvaianica, about 20 km (12.5 mi) from Ostia along the Roman coast

== Geography ==
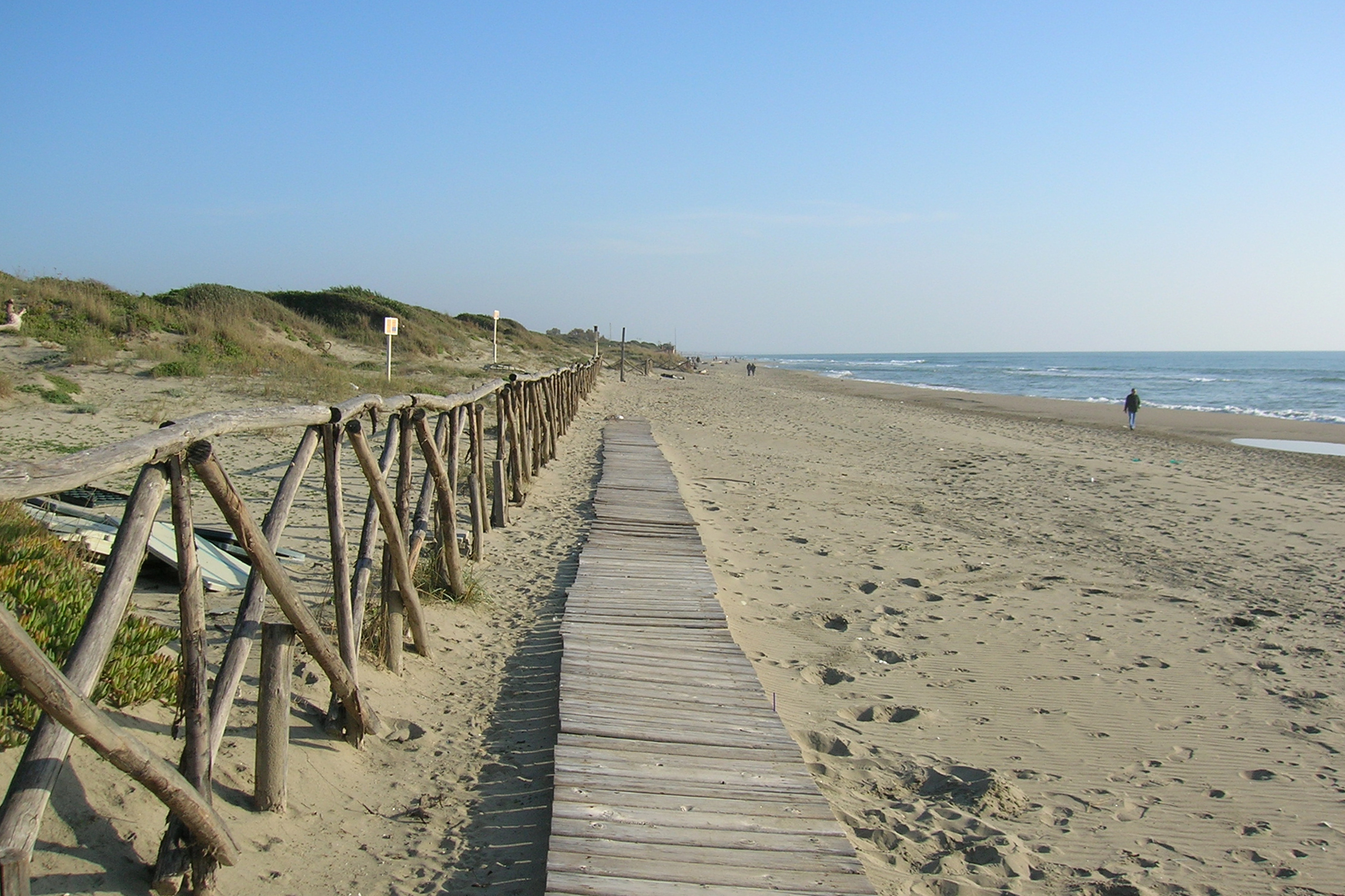
Capocotta beach, it is part of the Litorale Romano State Nature Reserve

The neighborhood is located on the Tyrrhenian coast, close to Acilia and separated from Fiumicino by the mouth of the Tiber. Other borders are the pine forest of Castelfusano and Viale dei Promontori, which represents the border with the residential areas of Casal Palocco and Infernetto, while to the south it borders with Torvaianica, a frazione of the municipality of Pomezia.

The territory is almost completely flat with small hilly reliefs made up of dunes. The vegetation is composed of Maquis shrubland (macchia) and there are several centuries-old pine forests made up of domestic and maritime pines, holly oaks, elms and poplars. Ostia has a Mediterranean climate (Köppen climate classification: Csa, a code indicating warm-temperate with dry, hot summers). Located on the coast, enjoys warmer winters and cooler summers than central Rome.

Climate data for Ostia
Month	Jan	Feb	Mar	Apr	May	Jun	Jul	Aug	Sep	Oct	Nov	Dec	Year
Mean daily maximum °C (°F)	12.9 (55.2)	13.7 (56.7)	15.3 (59.5)	18.0 (64.4)	22.0 (71.6)	25.6 (78.1)	28.6 (83.5)	28.7 (83.7)	26.0 (78.8)	22.0 (71.6)	17 (63)	14 (57)	20.3 (68.6)
Mean daily minimum °C (°F)	3.7 (38.7)	4.4 (39.9)	5.8 (42.4)	8.3 (46.9)	11.9 (53.4)	15.6 (60.1)	18.2 (64.8)	18.4 (65.1)	15.8 (60.4)	12.0 (53.6)	8.1 (46.6)	5.1 (41.2)	10.6 (51.1)
Average precipitation mm (inches)	81 (3.2)	76 (3)	66 (2.6)	56 (2.2)	33 (1.3)	15 (0.6)	15 (0.6)	33 (1.3)	69 (2.7)	94 (3.7)	110 (4.4)	89 (3.5)	737 (29.1)
Source: Servizio Meteorologico

== Transportation ==
The regional Metromare, which carries over 90,000 passengers a day, connects Rome's Ostia neighborhood to the centre of Rome, providing up to 12 journeys per hour during rush hour. The full length of the line is 28.359 kilometres (17.621 mi). It has 13 stops, and the journey time is roughly 37 minutes. The Metromare railway intersects the metro line B at the EUR Magliana and Basilica San Paolo stations and at the terminus Roma Porta San Paolo, where it is possible to change to the station Piramide (Rome Metro, Line B) and with the Roma Ostiense railway station.

Rail stops in the Ostia quarter are Ostia Antica, Lido Nord, Lido Centro, Stella Polare, Castel Fusano and Cristoforo Colombo.

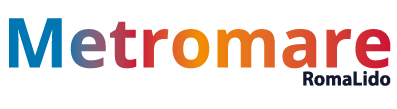
Metromare logo, indicates the service operated by Cotral on the Rome-Lido railway

Rome-Fiumicino airport is about 10km (6.2 mi) north from the center of Ostia, and is connected to it by the SS296 regional road. The sea quarter of Rome-Ostia is connected to central quarters of Rome and the Grande Raccordo Anulare (GRA) via the streets Via Cristoforo Colombo and Via Ostiense (SS8 bis). Cotral buses provide a rapid connection service from the Lido di Ostia Centro station of the Metromare to Fiumicino airport.
