= Ostia Antica (district) =

District in Rome, Italy

- Zona of Rome
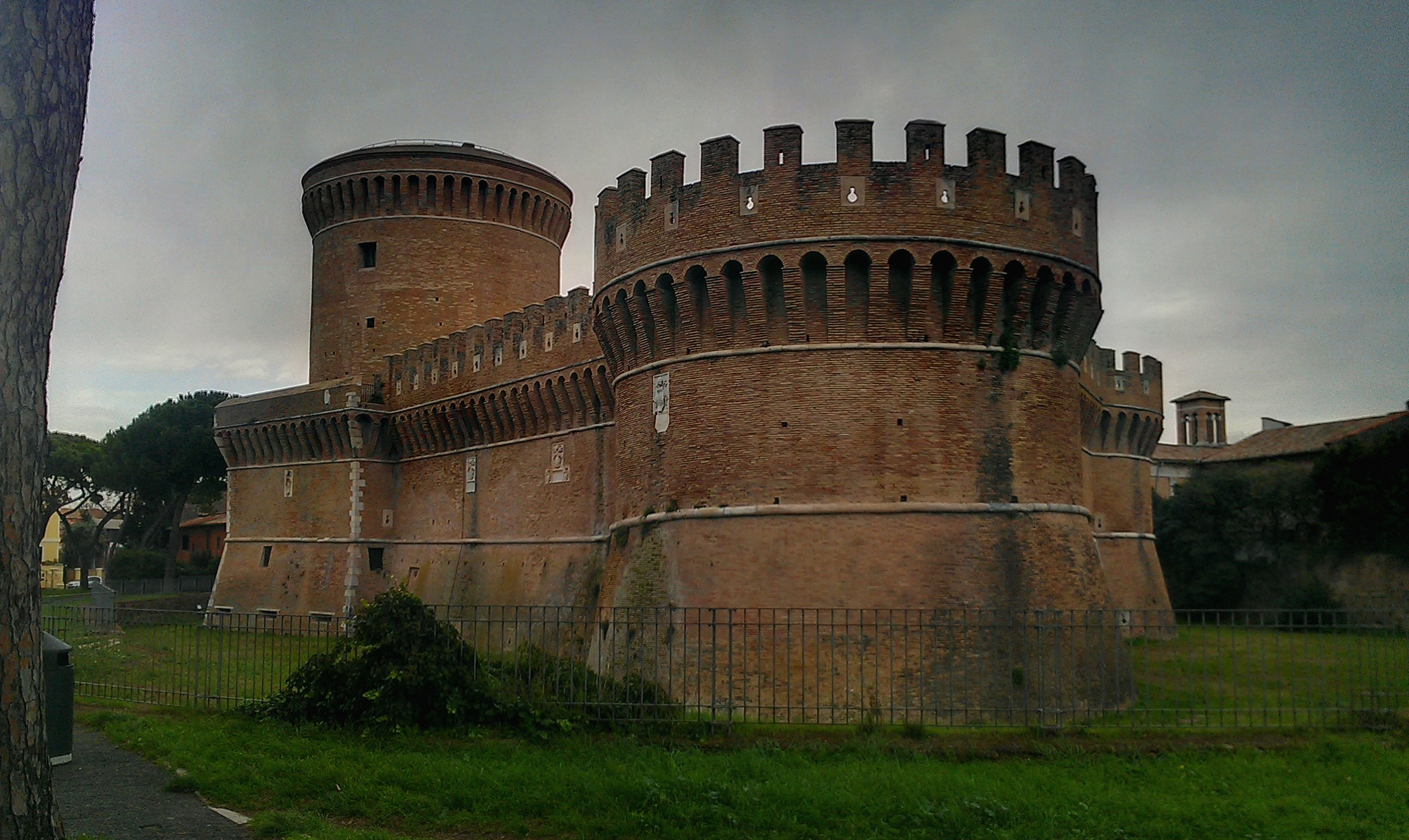
- The Castle of Julius II in Ostia Antica.

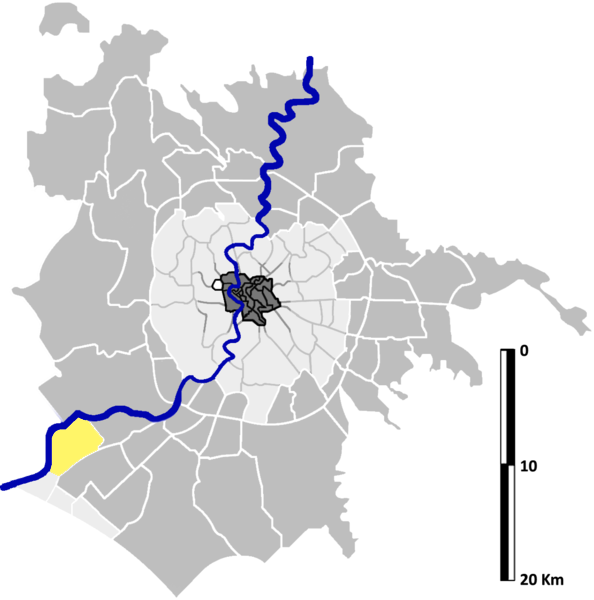
- Position of the zona within the city
- Country: Italy
- Region: Lazio
- Province: Rome
- Comune: Rome

Area
  - Total: 5.7903 sq mi (14.9967 km^{2})

Population (2016)
  - Total: 11,681
  - Density: 2,017/sq mi (778.9/km^{2})
- Time zone: UTC+1 (CET)
  - Summer (DST): UTC+2 (CEST)

Ostia Antica is the 35th zona of Rome, Italy, four kilometers away from the coast. It is identified by the initials Z. XXXV and it is distinct from Ostia. Ostia Antica belongs to Municipio X.

== History ==
Under the Romans, Ostia Antica reached a peak of some 75,000 inhabitants in the 2nd and 3rd centuries AD. The city became an episcopal see as part of the Diocesi of Rome as early as the 3rd century. St. Augustine passed through in the late 4th century; his mother, St. Monica, died here in 387 in a house property of the Diocesi of Rome. The cathedral (titulus) of Santa Aurea was later erected over her tomb. In 414 the poet Rutilius Namatianus reported a lack of maintenance of the city; it is traditionally thought that Ostia began a slow decline in the time of Constantine I, but data from recent excavations put the date of decline later. The city contained 26 operating baths in the 4th century and there is plenty of evidence of repairs on public buildings and the construction of new edifices. There was decay in some areas, but this late period was primarily one of transition; formerly filled with workers employed in collecting, storing and moving huge amounts of grain, oil, wine and other products to feed Rome, Ostia now assumed the character of a seaside resort. The city remained prosperous into the 5th century, as it was the seat of the Praefectus annonae. There was expansion beyond the western and southern walls in the area of the Porta Marina.

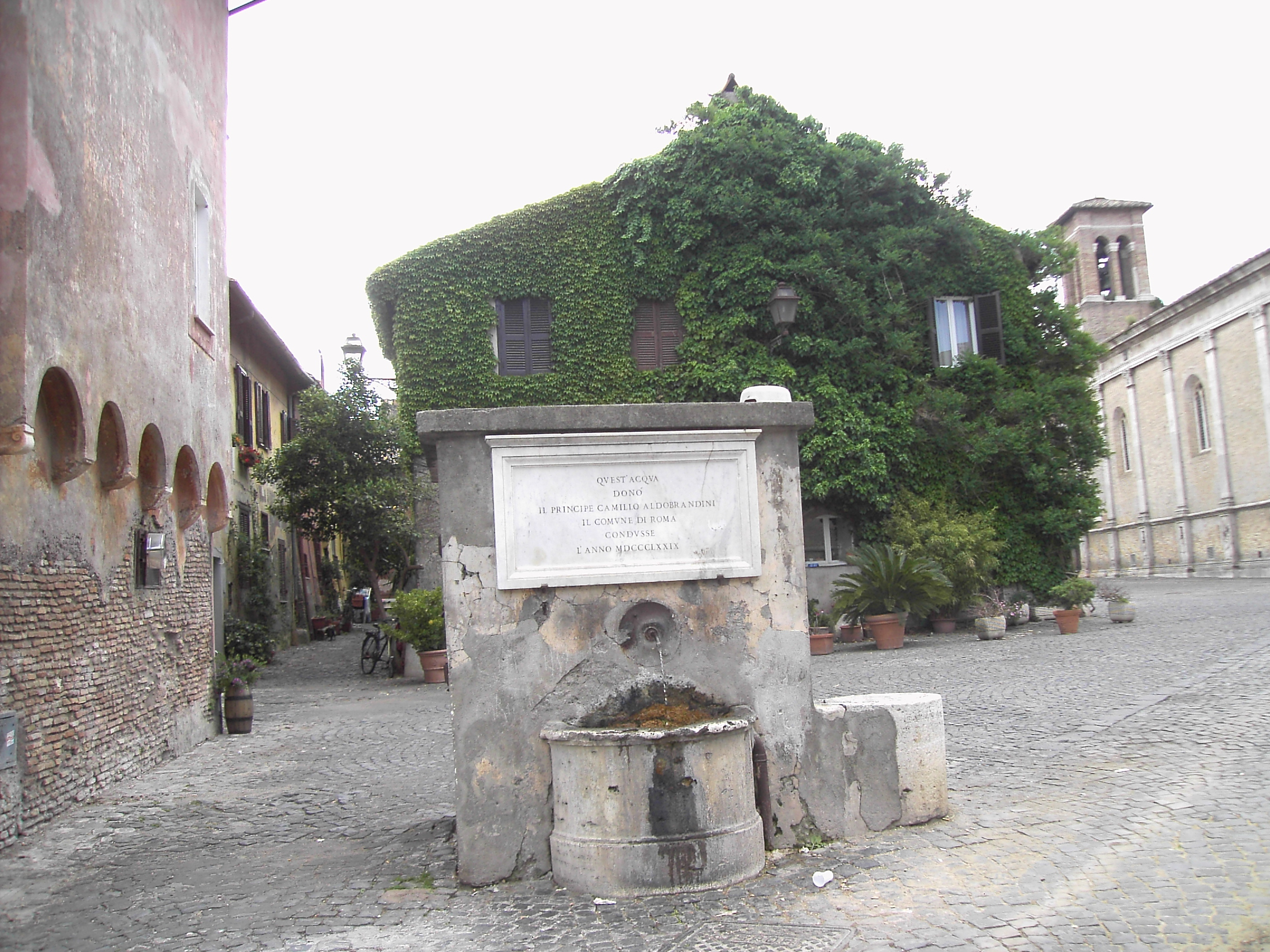
The square of Ostia Antica, with the church of Santa Aurea on the right.

As the centuries passed, Ostia fell into ruin but continued to provide maritime access for visitors to Rome. Saracen pirates were a frequent concern; the naval Battle of Ostia was fought off the coast in 849. Pope Gregory IV fortified the existing borough and it was rechristened Gregoriopoli. By this time, the shifting course of the Tiber had landlocked the ancient port, and the town was mainly a shelter for the workers of the nearby salt mills.

In the late 15th century, the bishop Giuliano della Rovere (later Pope Julius II) commissioned the rebuilding of the main church and town walls under the direction of the architect Baccio Pontelli. The Castle of Julius II, also built at this time, remains the most striking feature of modern Ostia. The castle was abandoned after a flood in 1587 inundated its moat and turned the surrounding area into a marsh.

The castle and the town were restored again in the 20th century.

== Geography ==
Ostia Antica is located in the south-western part of the municipality of Rome, separated from the urban complex, along the river Tiber.

The territory of Ostia Antica includes the major part of the urban zone 13E Ostia Antica.

=== Boundaries ===
Ostia Antica borders to the north with the municipality of Fiumicino, from which is separated by the stretch of the river Tiber between Ponte di Tor Boacciana and the Canale dei Pescatori.

The zone borders eastward with Zona Acilia Nord (Z. XXXII), whose boundary is marked by the Canale dei Pescatori, up to Via del Mare.

To the south-east, Ostia Antica borders with Zona Casal Palocco (Z. XXXIV), whose border is marked by the stretch of Via del Mare between Via della Macchiarella and Via di Tor Boacciana.

To the south-west, the zone borders with Quartiere Lido di Ostia Ponente (Q. XXXIV), from which is separated by Via di Tor Boacciana, up to the river Tiber.

=== Historical subdivision ===
Beside the frazione of the same name, which also includes the ancient borough, the territory of Ostia Antica includes the urban areas of Saline di Ostia and Bagnoletto.

=== Odonymy ===
While in the ancient village of Ostia road and squares are mainly named after places and people related to the ancient local history, odonyms of the surrounding area all refers to archaeologists and historians. Few streets near the border with Acilia Nord are named after towns of Veneto and Lombardia. Odonyms of the zone can be categorized as follows:

- Archaeologists, e.g. Via Andras Alfoldi, Via Giovanni Antonio Antolini, Via Anselmo Banduri, Via Giovanni Becatti, Via Gian Pietro Bellori, Via Enrico Brunn, Via Guido Calza, Via Secondiano Campanari, Via Ferdinando Castagnoli, Via Mauro Cristofani, Via Gabriele de Mortillet, Via Giorgio Dennis, Via Pericle Ducati, Via Arturo Evans, Via Giuseppe Fiorelli, Via Raffaele Garrucci, Via Albert Grenier, Via Walter Lehmann, Via Giuseppe Lugli, Via Stefano Antonio Morcelli, Via Oscar Montelius, Via Massimo Pallottino, Via Charles Picard, Via Pietro Romanelli, Via Carlo Maria Rosini, Via Francesco Salvolini, Via Domenico Serradifalco, Via Giovanni Spano, Via Antonio Taramelli, Via Gabriele Torremuzza;
- Local toponyms, e.g. Via di Bagnoletto, Via Capo Due Rami, Via del Collettore Primario, Via della Macchiarella, Via del Macchione Rotondo, Via dei Monti del Sale, Via del Ponte delle Memorie, Via delle Saline, Via degli Scavi;
- People related to Ostia, e.g. Via Aristo, Via Cardinal Cybo, Via Claudia Quinta, Via Conte di Pitigliano, Via Gavio Massimo, Via della Gente Salinatoria, Via Gesualdo, Via Gherardo, Via Gloriano, Via dei Martiri Ostiensi, Via San Massimo;
- Towns of Lombardia, e.g. Via Albosaggia, Via Asola, Via Barzanò, Via Bigarello, Via Caiolo, Via Carlazzo, Via Casarile, Via Castellucchio, Via Cermenate, Via Cremosano, Via Merate;
- Towns of Veneto, e.g. Via Altivole, Via Bardolino, Via Bergantino, Via Bovolenta, Via Ceneselli, Via Pedavena, Via Preganziol, Via Recoaro Terme, Via Rovolon, Via Soverzene, Via Tambre, Via Vallada Agordina.

== Places of interest ==
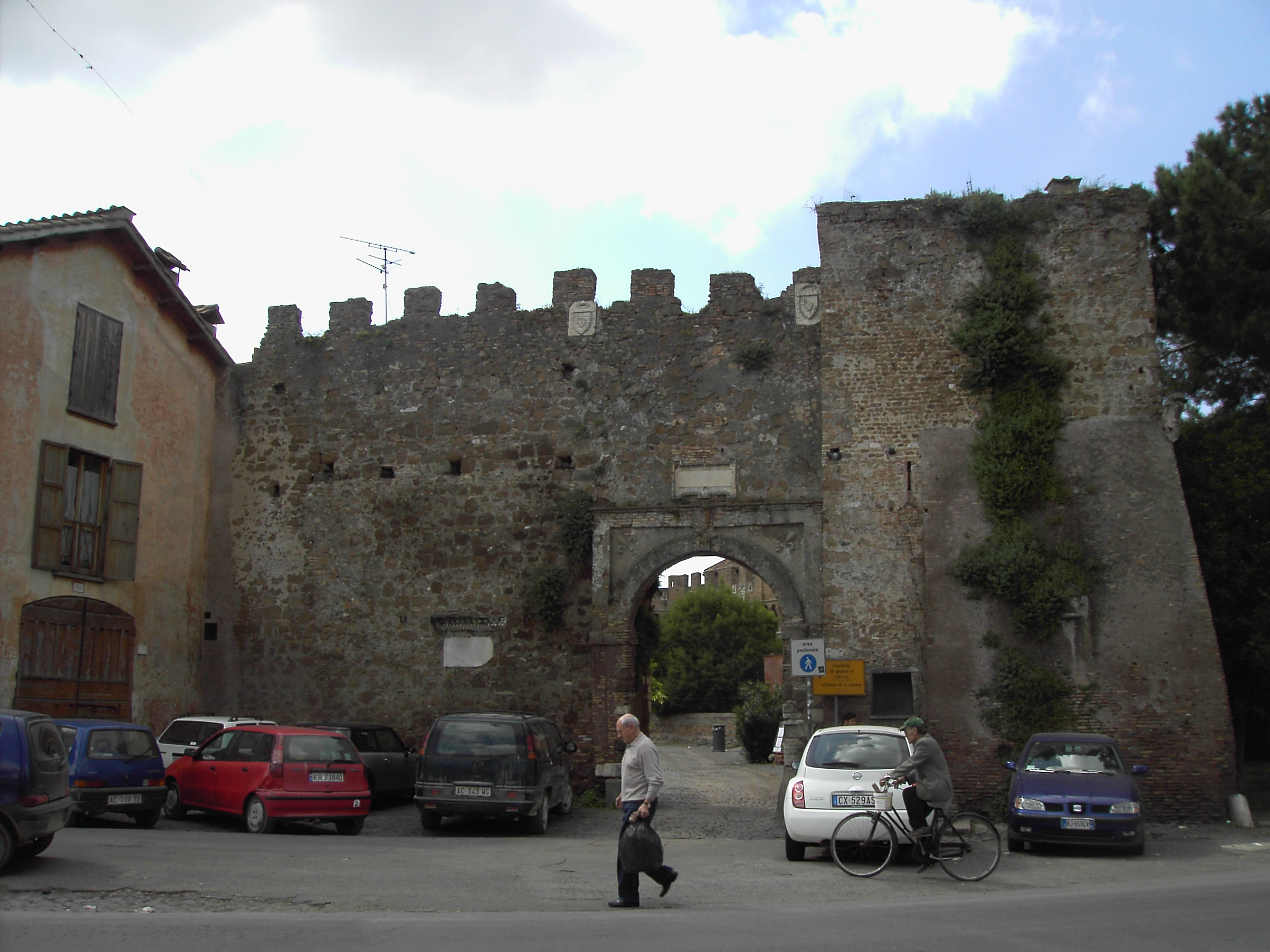
The entry of the ancient burg.

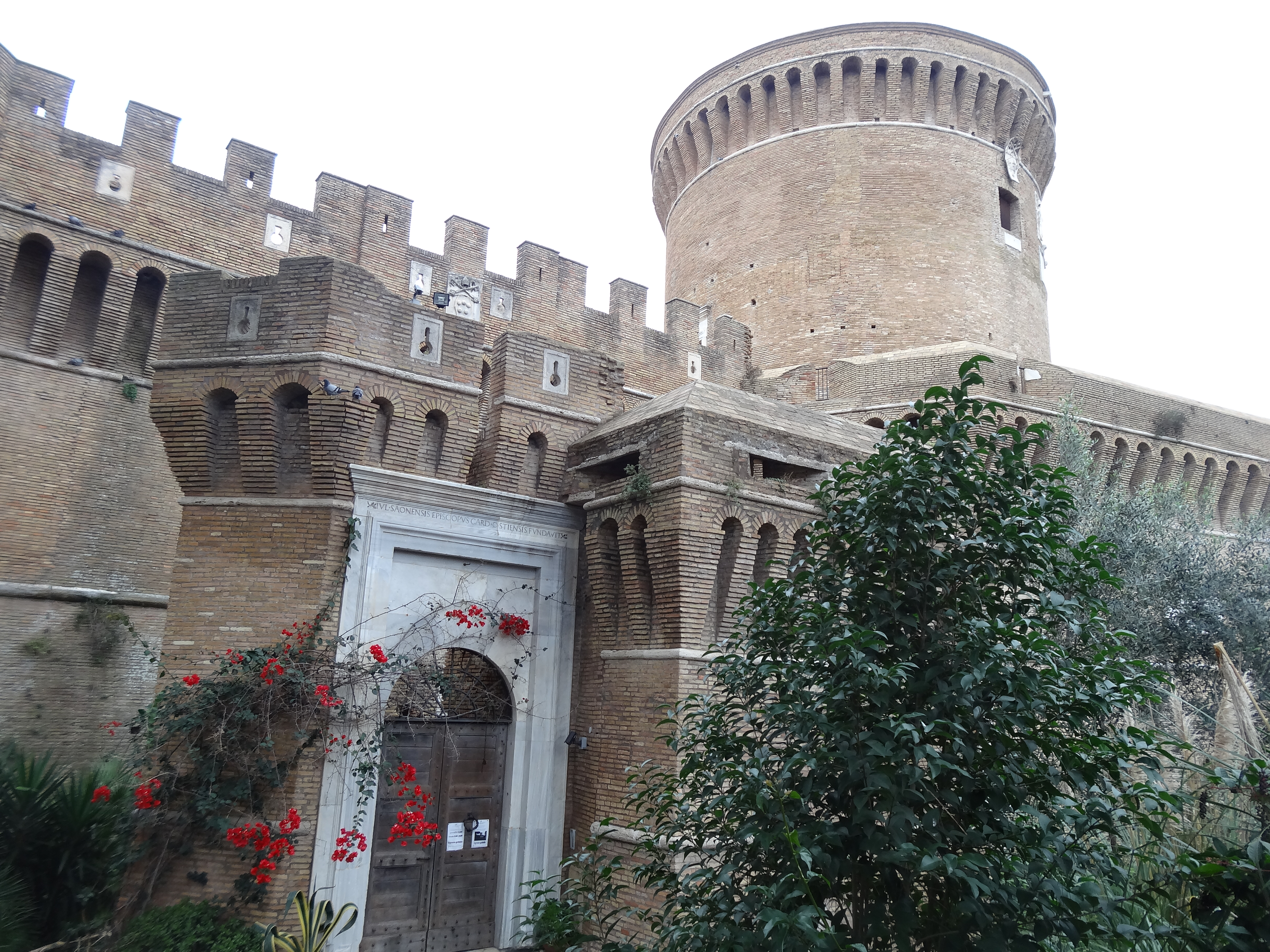
The entrance of the castle.

=== Civil buildings ===
- the burg of Gregoriopoli, a 9th-century citadel (830). 41.759636°N 12.301893°E

a fortress whose construction was promoted by Pope Gregory IV.

- Casone Pontificio del Sale, near the archaeological site of Ostia antica. A 15th-century building. 41.755714°N 12.287595°E

it became the museum of the archaeological area in 19th century by decision of Pope Pius IX.

- Castle of Julius II or Rocca di Ostia, in Viale dei Romagnoli. 15th-century Renaissance fortress (1423-86).

the castle was commissioned by cardinal Giuliano della Rovere, the later Pope Julius II, incorporating an elder defensive tower which had been built in 1423 by order of Pope Martin V.

=== Archaeological sites ===
- Ostia Antica

=== Religious buildings ===
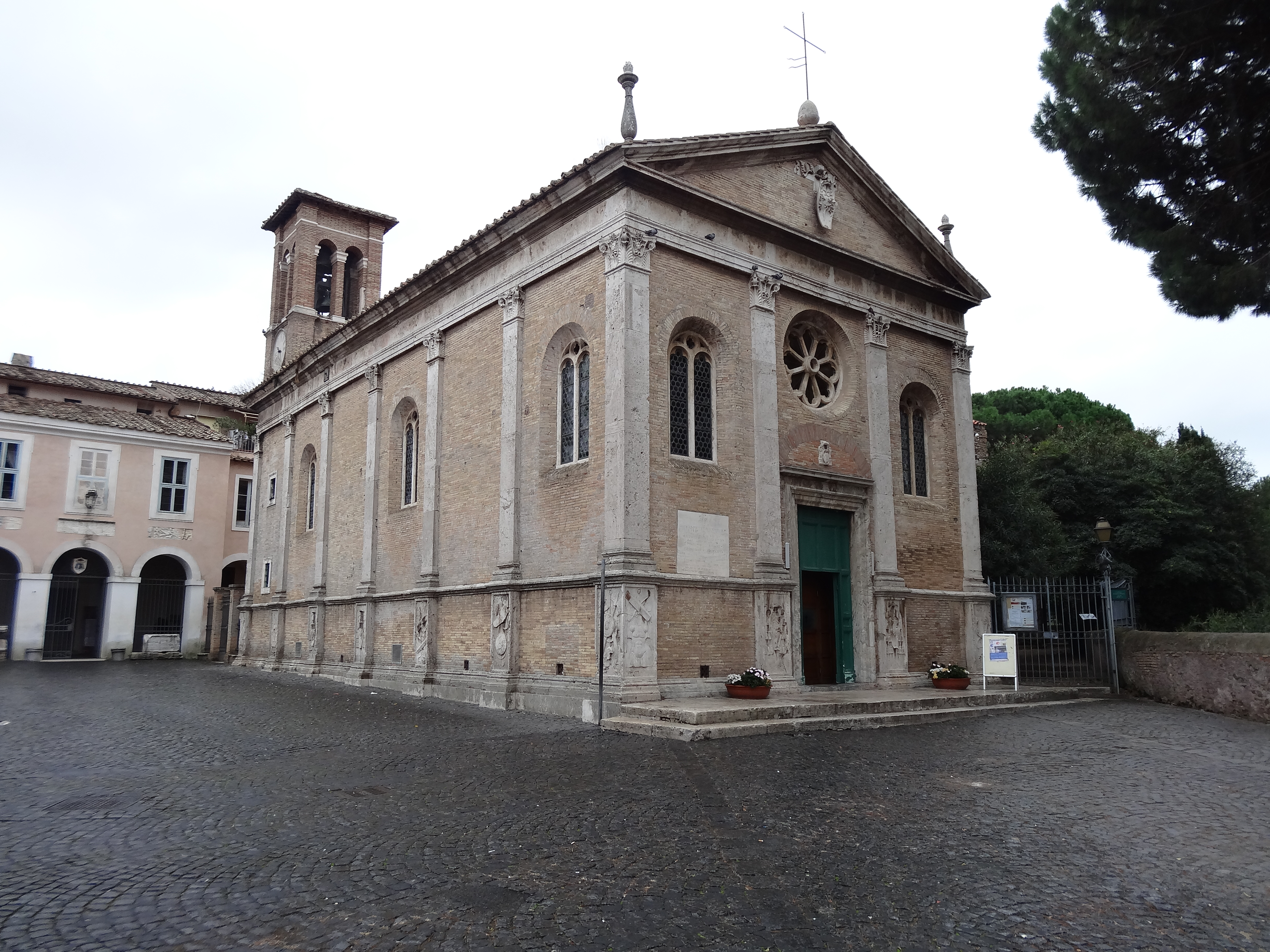
The basilica of Santa Aurea.

- Santa Aurea, in Viale dei Romagnoli. 15th-century Renaissance church (1483).

=== Natural areas ===
- Litorale Romano State Nature Reserve
- Parco dei Ravennati, located among Via dei Martiri Ostiensi, Via della Gente Salinatoria, Via del Mare, Viale dei Romagnoli, Via Gesualdo and Via Gloriano. 41.759712°N 12.303119°E

it is dedicated to the people that took part in the reclamation of the area, most of whom were from Ravenna.

== In popular culture ==
- Ostia was featured in the novels I, Claudius and Claudius the God, both written by British novelist Robert Graves. The novels include scenes set at Ostia spanning from the reign of Augustus to the reign of Claudius, including the departure of Agrippa to Syria and Claudius's reconstruction of the harbour. In the 1976 television series, Ostia was frequently mentioned but never actually seen.
- Ostia appears briefly towards the end of the Roman Empire section of the 1981 comedy film History of the World, Part I, where the main characters board a galleon (bearing the El Al logo) bound for Judaea. In the film, however, Ostia is only ever referred to as simply "the port".
- Ostia is the home town of the main characters of the children series, The Roman Mysteries by Caroline Lawrence.

== Bibliography ==
- Patrizio Pensabene (2007). Ostensium marmorum decus et decor. L'Erma di Bretschneider. ISBN 978-88-8265-345-3.
- Sandro Lorenzatti (2007). Ostia. Storia Ambiente Itinerari. Genius Loci.
