= Santa Monica di Ostia =

- Church of Saint Monica in Ostia
- Parrocchia Santa Monica di Ostia
- Location within Lazio
- 41°44′12″N 12°16′21″E
- Location: Piazza di Santa Monica 1, Lido di Ostia, Rome
- Country: Italy
- Language: Italian
- Denomination: Catholic
- Tradition: Roman Rite

History
- Status: parish church
- Dedication: Saint Monica
- Consecrated: 22 December 1973

Architecture
- Functional status: active
- Architect: Ernesto Vichi
- Architectural type: Modern
- Years built: 1968–72

Administration
- Diocese: Rome

Santa Monica di Ostia is a 20th-century parochial church in the Lido di Ostia, Rome dedicated to Saint Monica.

== History ==
The church was built in 1968–72.
