= Centro Habitat Mediterraneo =

Protected area in Italy

LIPU Oasis Centro Habitat Mediterraneo
- Mediterranean Habitat Center
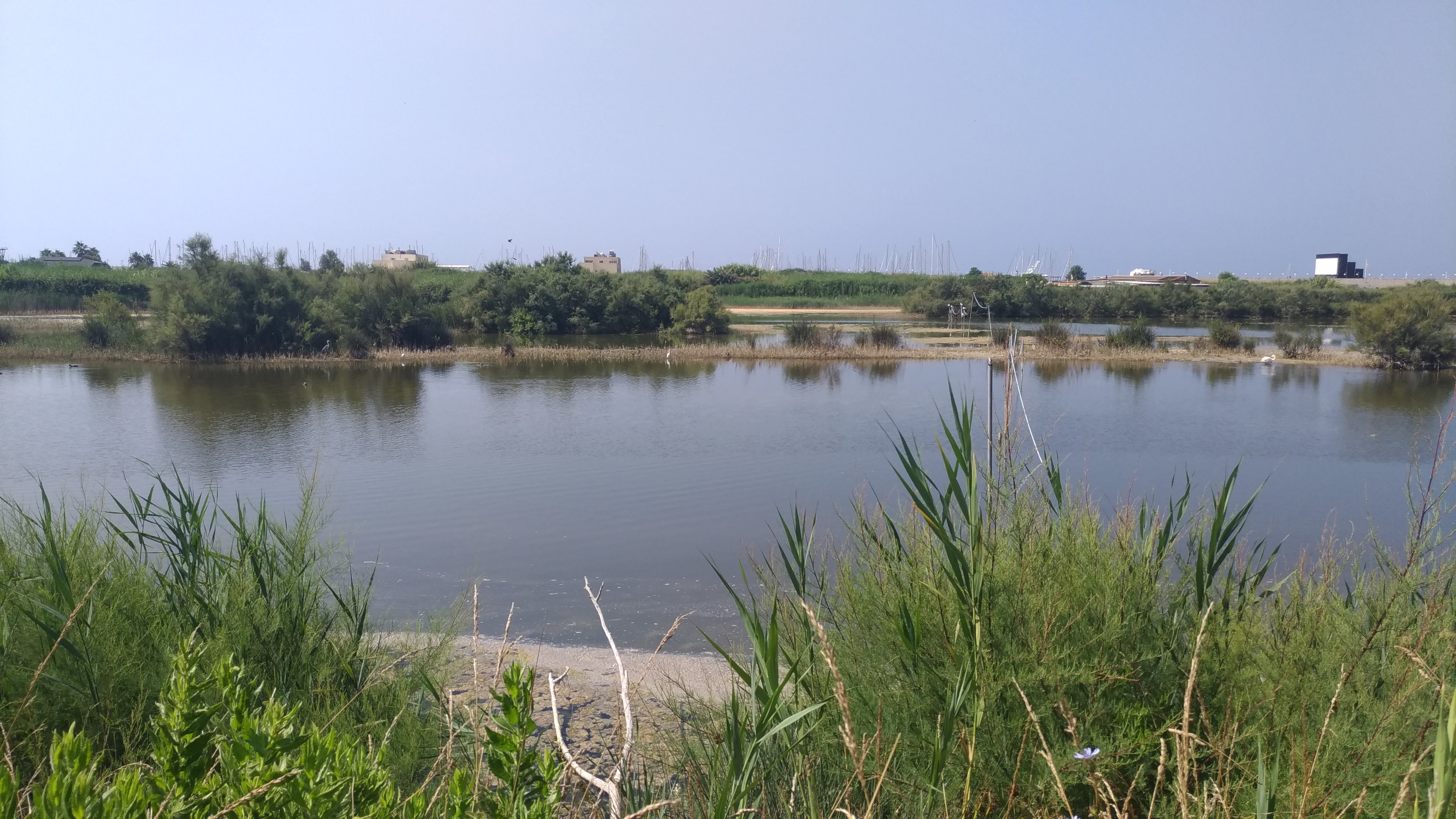
- The artificial pond of the Centro Habitat Mediterraneo seen from the 1st photographic shed.
- Interactive map of LIPU Oasis; Centro Habitat Mediterraneo
- Location: Lazio, Italy
- Nearest city: Rome
- Coordinates: 41°44′26″N 12°14′54″E
- Area: 20 ha (49 acres)
- Designation: Regional park
- Administrator: LIPU

The Centro Habitat Mediterraneo (CHM; Italian for "Center for Mediterranean Habitat") is an oasis of 20 hectares (49 acres), located on the Italian coast near Rome, included in the Litorale Romano State Nature Reserve and managed by the Italian Bird Protection League (LIPU).

== History ==
In the 1990s, the area of the Ostia Seaplane Base was occupied by an open landfill site, known for being the scene of the murder of Pier Paolo Pasolini on November 2, 1975.
In 1995 the area caught the attention of an Australian company, which proposed the construction of an oceanarium that would irreparably alter the ecosystem of the mouth of the Tiber. To oppose this proposal, the Ostia delegation of the Italian Bird Protection League (LIPU) proposed the creation of a nature reserve and – after a heartfelt campaign to collect signatures within the XIII Circoscrizione (today the Municipio X) – the project was approved; after the reclamation of the area, the oasis opened in 2001. This was also accompanied by the inauguration of the nearby Marina of Rome, part of a project for the redevelopment of the seaplane base area.

The 20 hectares of greenery, with an artificial pond in the center, are a refuge and a stopping place for various species of animals (mainly birds) and attract professional photographers and birdwatchers from all over the world. Inside the oasis there is the "Pier Paolo Pasolini" Literary Park, inaugurated on November 2, 2005, where a concrete sculpture was erected to commemorate the well-known Italian writer and director. The sculpture, the work of Mario Rosati, was damaged in 2016 by some vandals but was restored over the following year.
In 2016 a bunker dating back to World War II, probably for anti-aircraft use, was unearthed in the oasis.

== Flora ==
The flora is typical of the maquis shrubland, with Italian buckthorn, bay laurel, giant cane, strawberry tree, phillyrea, sea daffodil, broom, rushes, evergreen oak, lentisk, silver poplar, rosemary, blackberry, willow, cork oak, tamarisk.

== Fauna ==
=== Little mammals ===
Coypu, European hedgehog, red fox.

=== Birds ===
Great egret, grey heron, western cattle egret, purple heron, Eurasian teal, white wagtail, zitting cisticola, gadwall, Eurasian blackcap, black-winged stilt, mute swan, great cormorant, little ringed plover, common pheasant, western marsh harrier, peregrine falcon, common firecrest, red-crested pochard, Eurasian coot, moustached warbler, yellow-legged gull, common moorhen, little egret, mallard, common kestrel, European bee-eater, common chiffchaff, pygmy cormorant, common kingfisher, garganey, northern shoveler, common reed bunting, whiskered tern, ferruginous duck, common pochard, black-crowned night heron, Sardinian warbler, common greenshank, Eurasian penduline tit, European robin, common sandpiper, wood sandpiper, common buzzard, water rail, barn swallow, little crake, squacco heron, Eurasian spoonbill, great crested grebe, western jackdaw, Eurasian bittern, little bittern, Eurasian collared dove, European turtle dove, spotted redshank, little grebe, Cetti's warbler, common shelduck

=== Reptiles and amphibians ===
Green whip snake, four-lined snake, Italian three-toed skink, grass snake, edible frog, common toad, Hermann's tortoise, European pond turtle.

=== Ichthyofauna ===
Common carp, flathead grey mullet, pumpkinseed.

=== Invertebrates ===
Damselfly, two-tailed pasha, skimmer, European mantis.

== Facilities ==
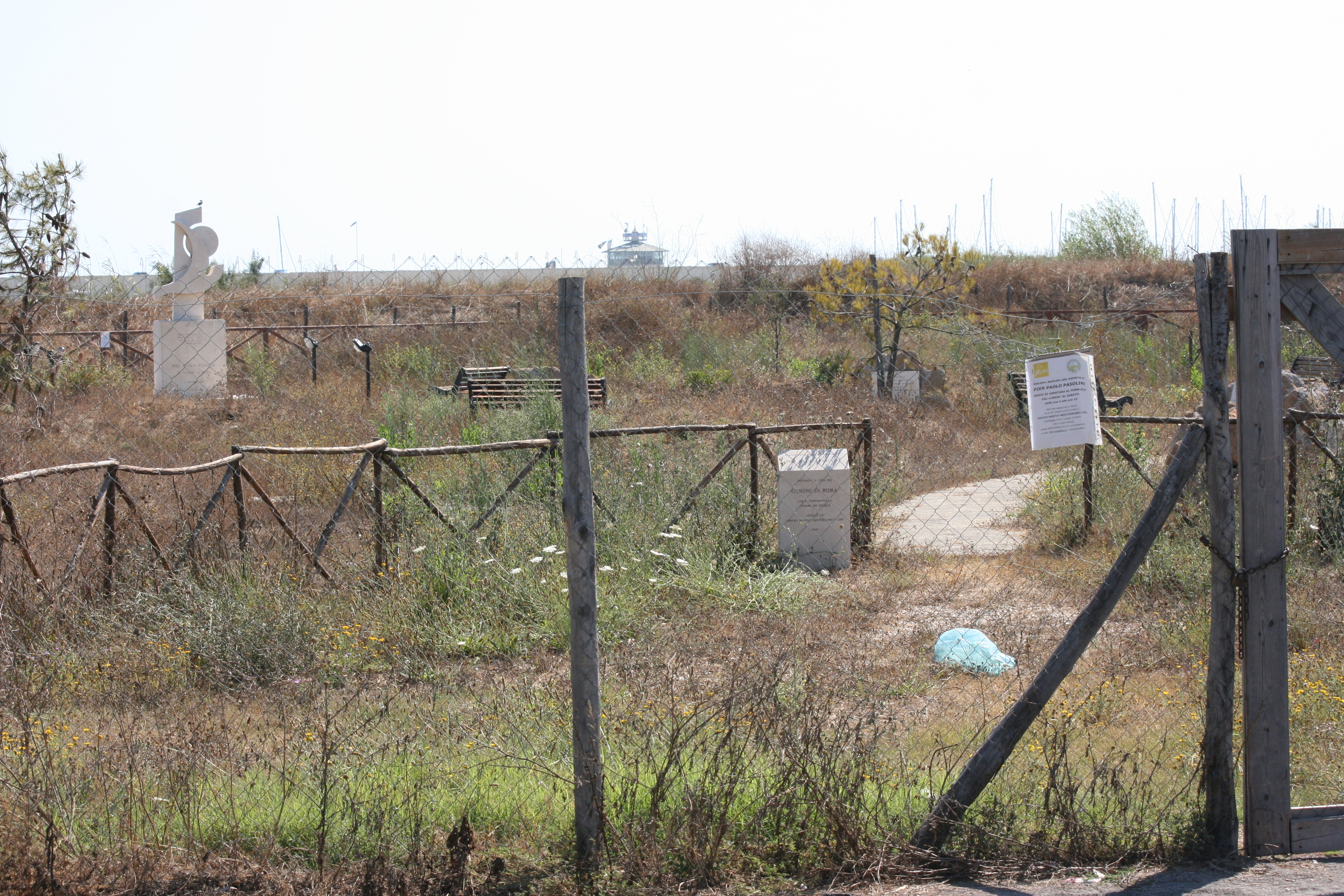
The "Pier Paolo Pasolini" Park.

The Centro Habitat Mediterraneo includes:

- the "Mario Pastore" Visitor Center (dedicated to the journalist and president of LIPU Mario Pastore), with function of providing first aid to injured wild animals and welcoming visitors by hosting and organizing cultural events;
- five photographic sheds, three of which are open all year to photographers and visitors and the other two are "floating" sheds reserved for authorized photographers;
- An anti-aircraft bunker dating back to World War II;
- The "Pier Paolo Pasolini" Park, also accessible from Via dell'Idroscalo.

== Transport ==
The center can be reached from the bus stops Idroscalo/Atlantici 1 and Idroscalo/Atlantici 2.
