= Litorale Romano State Nature Reserve =

Protected area in Italy

Riserva naturale Litorale Romano
- Litorale Romano nature reserve
- IUCN category IV (habitat/species management area)
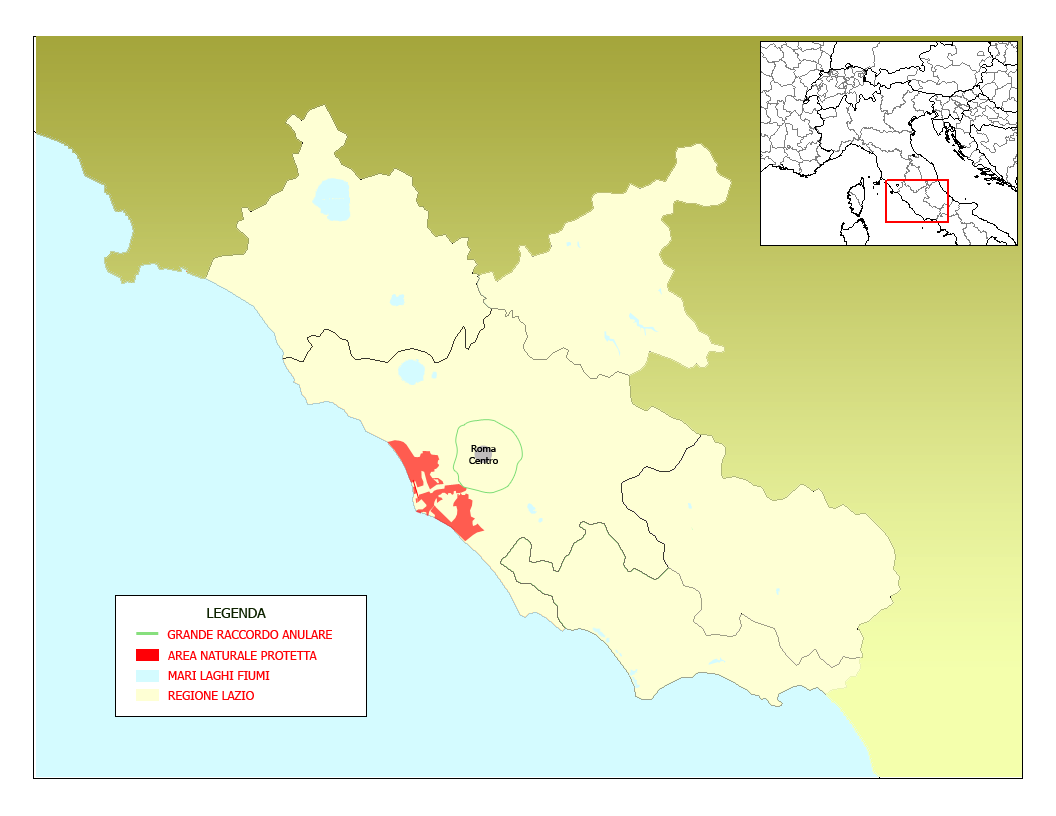
- Location of the Litorale Romano nature reserve within Lazio.
- Interactive map of Riserva naturale Litorale Romano
- Location: Metropolitan City of Rome Capital, Lazio (Italy)
- Coordinates: 41°48′57″N 12°14′55″E
- Area: 17,243.00 ha (66.5756 sq mi)
- Designation: State nature reserve
- Created: 1996
- Administrator: Municipality of Rome, Municipality of Fiumicino

The Litorale Romano state nature reserve is a protected area in Lazio (Italy), established by the Ministry of the Environment with Ministerial Decree of March 29, 1996, which includes a large territory of historical-naturalistic interest within the municipalities of Rome and Fiumicino at Tiber Valley.
With its over 17,000 hectares, discontinuously distributed along the Lazio coast between Palidoro and Capocotta, it is the largest protected area overlooking the Mediterranean Sea. Its management is entrusted to the two municipalities in their respective sections of competence.

== Territory ==
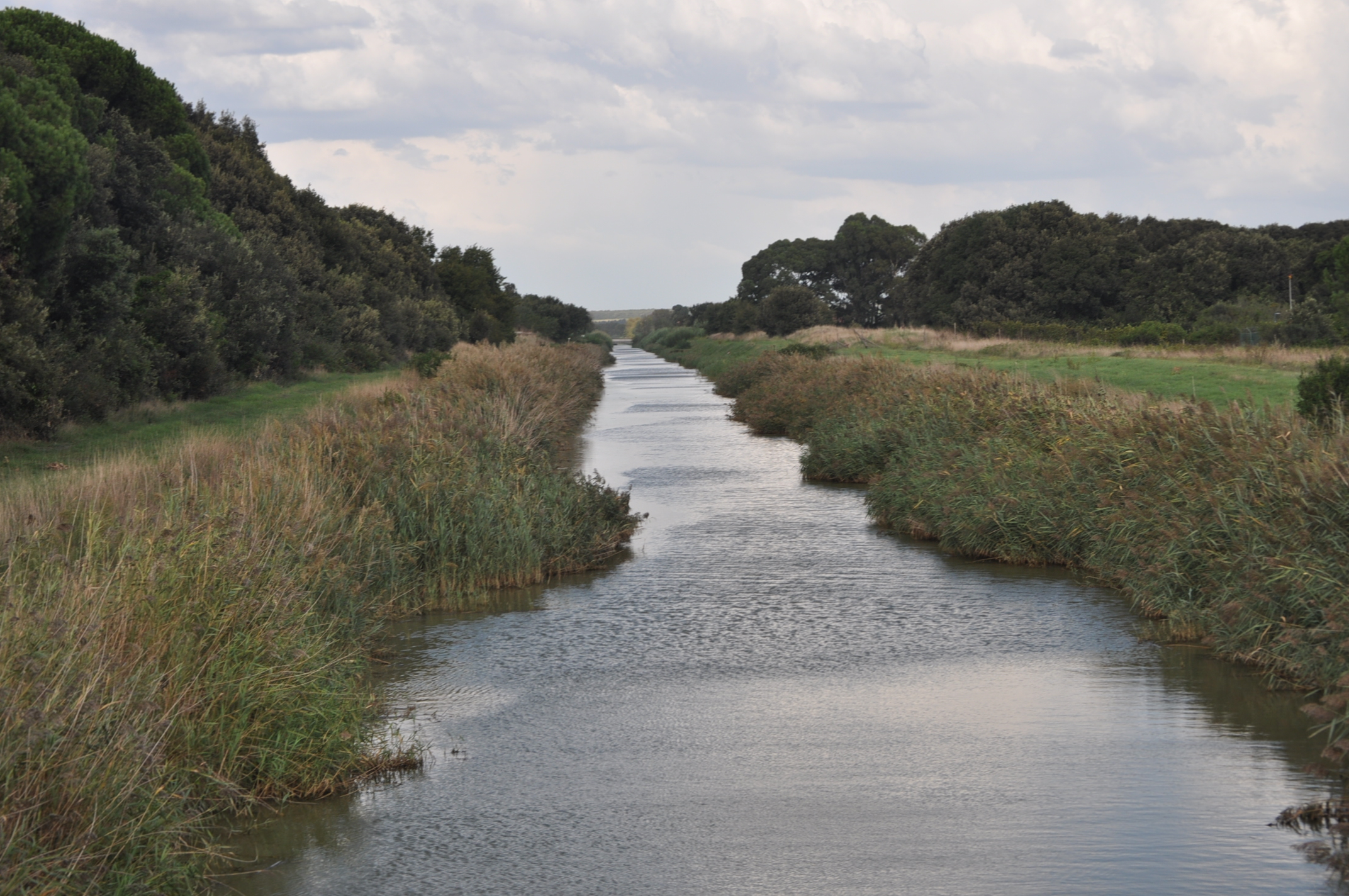
A channel within Macchiagrande oasis.

The territory of the reserve, which occupies an area of 17,243 hectares, includes large portions of land (mainly on the coast but also in the inland), encompassing zones of both naturalistic interest – such as the dunes of Palidoro and Capocotta, the oases of Macchiagrande and Castel di Guido or the pine forests of Castel Fusano and Coccia di Morto – and of historical and archaeological importance, such as the excavations of Ostia Antica, the remains of Portus and the coastal towers of the two municipalities (Tor San Michele, Tor Boacciana, Torre Primavera and Torre Perla).

Some natural areas have been granted to the environmental organizations LIPU and WWF Italia. From a hydrographic point of view, the reserve overlooks the Tyrrhenian Sea and is crossed by the rivers Tiber, whose valley and mouth are among the protected areas, and Arrone.

== History ==
The first instances for the establishment of a protected area on the Roman coast date back to the 1970s, but only in 1982, an official promoting committee was set up. A first attempt was made with the Decree of July 28, 1987, signed by the Minister of the Environment Mario Pavan. The State nature reserve was finally established with a ministerial Decree of March 29, 1996.

As a sensitive target for arsonists, the reserve is protected by one of the four AIB Plans for forest fire prevention of the state nature reserves in Lazio. The area also suffers from desertification. In 2000 the Municipality of Rome established the CEA (Centro per l'Educazione Ambientale), having its headquarters close to the Castel Fusano pinewood; a small museum of insects of the Roman coast has been set up there.

=== Areas of environmental interest ===
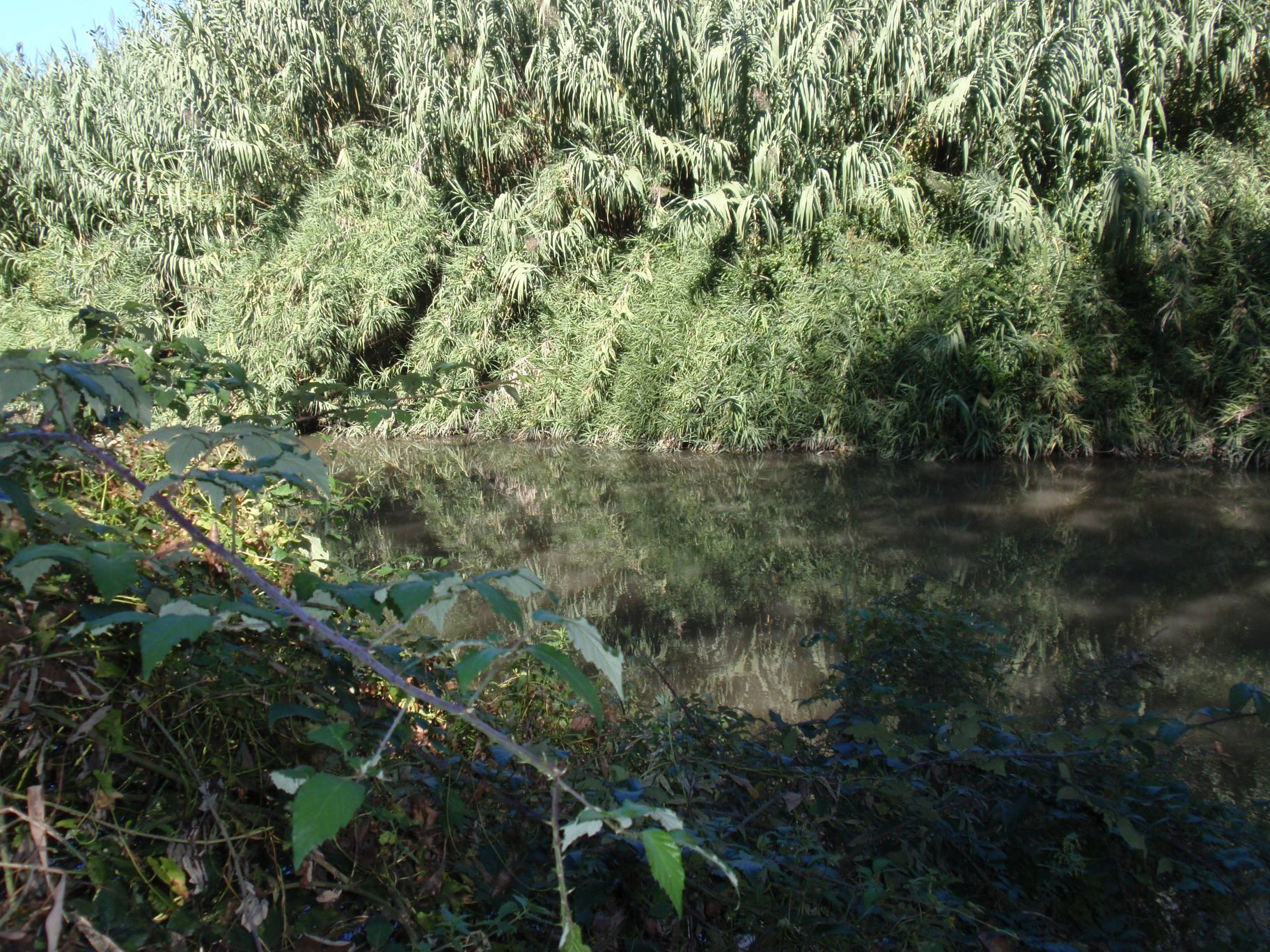
Arrone oasis.

- Centro Habitat Mediterraneo;
- Dunes of Palidoro;
- Macchiagrande di Galeria;
- Mouth of Arrone oasis;
- Castel di Guido oasis;
- Oasi di Macchiagrande;
- Vasche di Maccarese oasis;
- Castel Fusano Urban Park;
- Coccia di Morto pinewood;
- Procoio estate;
- Dunes of Bocca di Leone.

=== Areas of historical and archaeological interest ===
- Castello Rospigliosi;
- Gregoriopoli and Ostia Antica;
- Necropolis of Isola Sacra;
- Ostia Antica archaeological site;
- Portus archaeological site
- Tor Boacciana, Tor San Michele, Torre Primavera and Torre di Palidoro;
- Villa Chigi-Sacchetti.

== Fauna ==
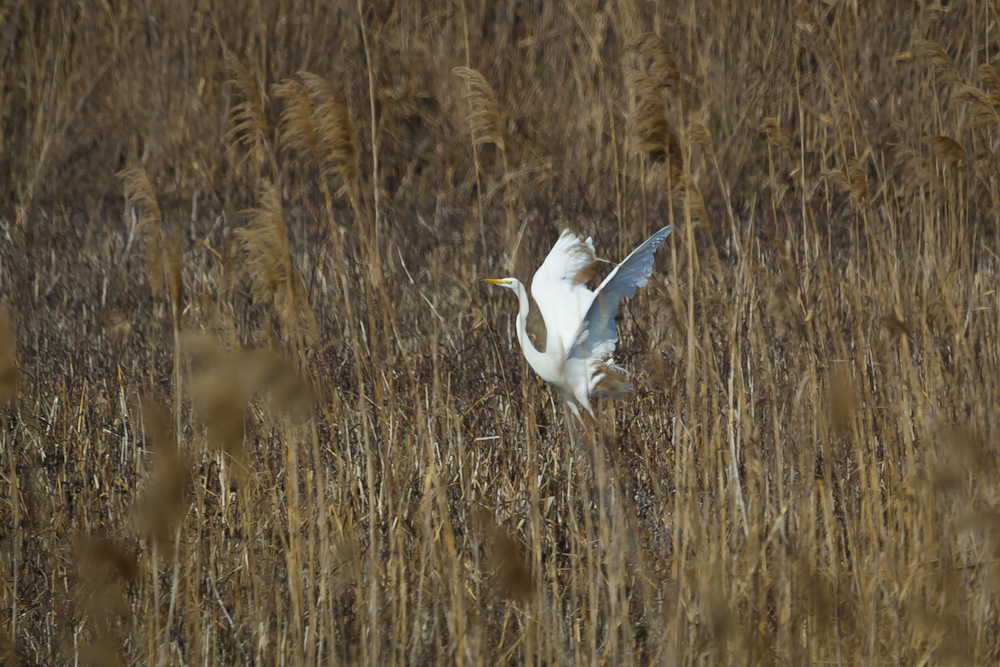
A great egret (ardea alba) at Vasche di Maccarese.

The mouth of the Tiber displays a mosaic of natural environments that still preserve a remarkable fauna.

=== Invertebrates ===
Due to the presence of centuries-old holm oaks forests, the rhinoceros beetle and the great capricorn beetle are very common, while the dunes host the Pimelia bipunctata and the Scarites. Among the butterflies there are the Philobrosis fregenella and the Caracoma nilotica (the only sighting in Italy).

=== Mammals ===
Wild boar, fallow deer, least weasel, beech marten, edible dormouse, crested porcupine, european pine marten, hazel dormouse, coypu, european hedgehog, european badger, red fox.

=== Fishes ===
European eel, crucian carp, common carp, Italian chub, flathead grey mullet, gambusia, zander, pumpkinseed.

=== Reptiles and amphibians ===
Asp, common wall lizard, Italian three-toed skink, dice snake, western green lizard, edible frog, american bullfrog, common toad, Hermann's tortoise, european pond turtle, pond slider, newt.

=== Birds ===
Great egret, grey heron, western cattle egret, tawny owl, red-backed shrike, western barn owl, mute swan, hooded crow, common pheasant, western marsh harrier, peregrine falcon, coot, yellow-legged gull, common moorhen, little egret, mallard, common kestrel, eurasian jay, european roller, european bee-eater, long-eared owl, common kingfisher, black kite, greylag goose, eurasian nuthatch, great spotted woodpecker, lesser spotted woodpecker, european green woodpecker, common buzzard, european nightjar, great crested grebe, western jackdaw, little bittern, little grebe, Cetti's warbler.

In autumn and winter it is possible to see great cormorants, cranes, ospreys, eurasian bitterns, eurasian spoonbills, black terns and mediterranean gulls. In spring the black-winged stilt and the purple heron are also frequent.

== See also ==
- Castel Fusano urban park (Rome)
- Castelporziano Nature Reserve
- Tiber Valley

== Bibliography ==
- VV.AA. (January 1, 1985). Capocotta ultima spiaggia. Proposta per il parco naturalistico-archeologico del litorale romano. Quasar di Tognon.
- Francesco Perego (February 27, 1998). Il Litorale diventa Riserva. Fiumicino.
- Mariagrazia Agrimi; Simone Bollati; Ervedo Giordano and Luigi Portoghesi (2002). "Struttura dei popolamenti e proposte di gestione per le pinete del litorale romano". L'Italia Forestale e Montana.
