= Tiber Valley =

Valley in Italy

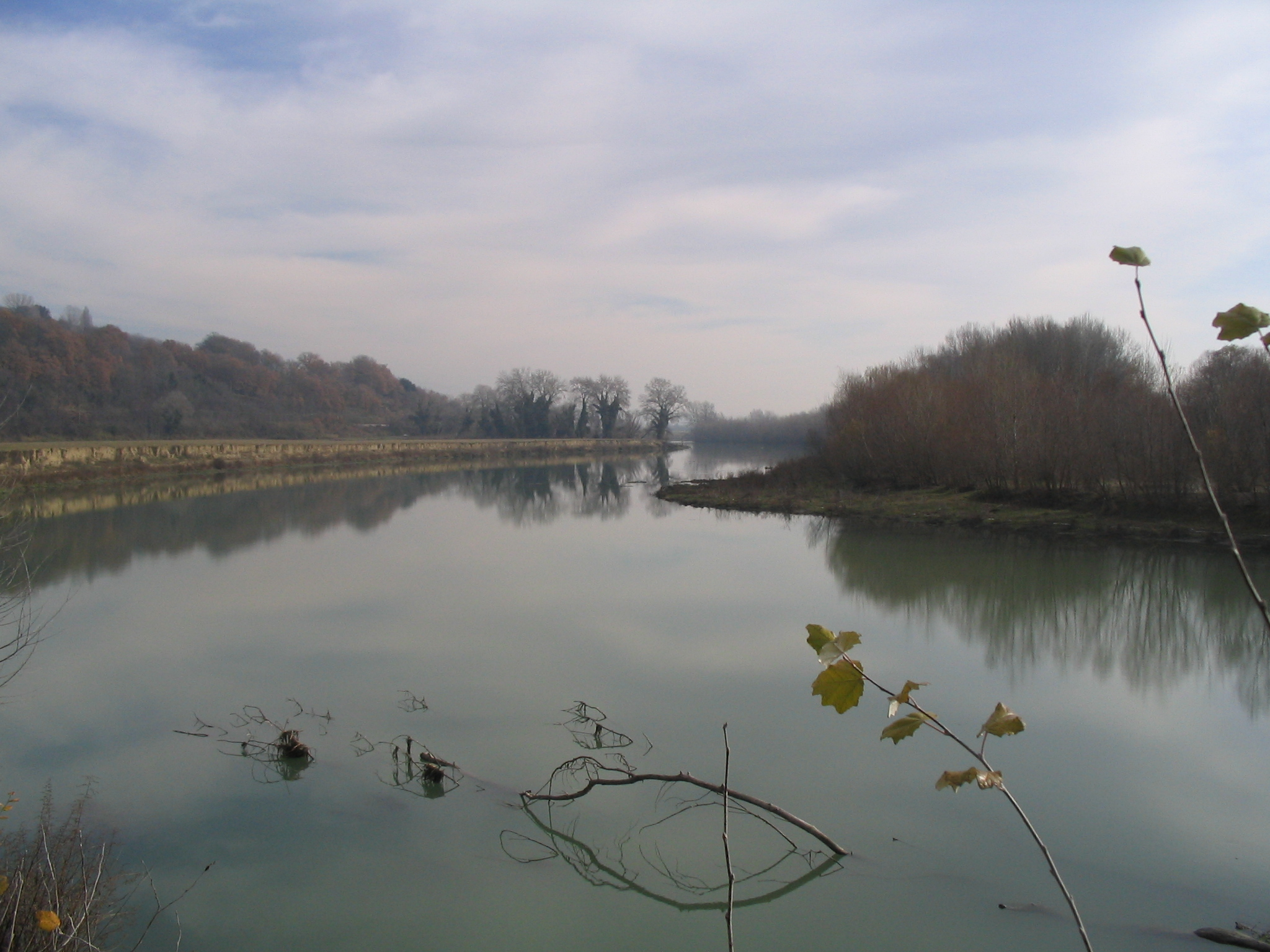
- Tiber Valley, Campo Rampone, archaeological area of Poggio Sommavilla

Naming
- Native name: Valle del Tevere (Italian)

Geography
- Country: Italy
- State/Province: Emilia-Romagna, Tuscany, Umbria, Lazio
- Coordinates: 42.133333°N 12.583333°E
- River: Tiber
- Interactive map of Tiber Valley

The Tiber Valley (Italian: Valle del Tevere) is the largest geographical part of the Tiber basin of the Tiber river included in the Emilia-Romagna, Tuscany, Umbria, and the Lazio regions; it is characterized by river terraces and floodplain areas that extend from the Apennine belt up to the delta of the Tiber river in the Lazio coast of the Tyrrhenian Sea.

== Geology ==
The Tiber basin is made up of four main morpho-structural environments:

- the upper Tiber basin, composed mainly of terrigenous sediment in flysch facies of Tuscan origin (on the right bank north of Lake Trasimeno) and Umbria-Marche (on the left bank)
- the Apennine carbonate ridge, which occupies the eastern and southern sector, made up of carbonate reliefs;
- the Tiber graben with its marine to continental facies deposits, the intermountain basins;
- the volcanic systems of the Volsini Mountains, Cimini, Sabatini and Alban Hills, which occupy the southwestern sector.

Graben

- Paleotevere Graben
- Paglia-Tevere Graben
- Tiber Graben (Chiana Valley)

== Territory and environment ==
=== Protected natural areas ===
- Tiber River Park - Umbria Region
- Interregional Tiber River Park
- Delta of the Tiber - Litorale Romano State Nature Reserve

== Gallery ==
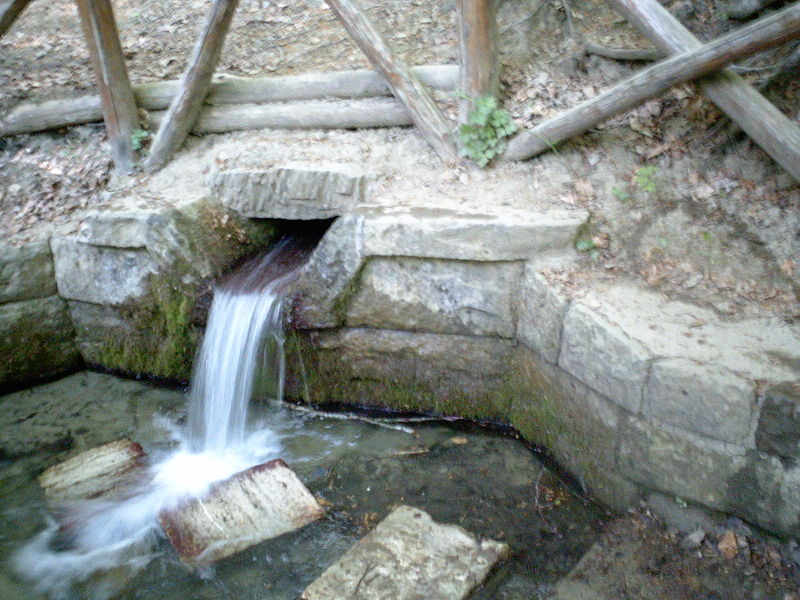
Sources of the Tiber - Monte Fumaiolo

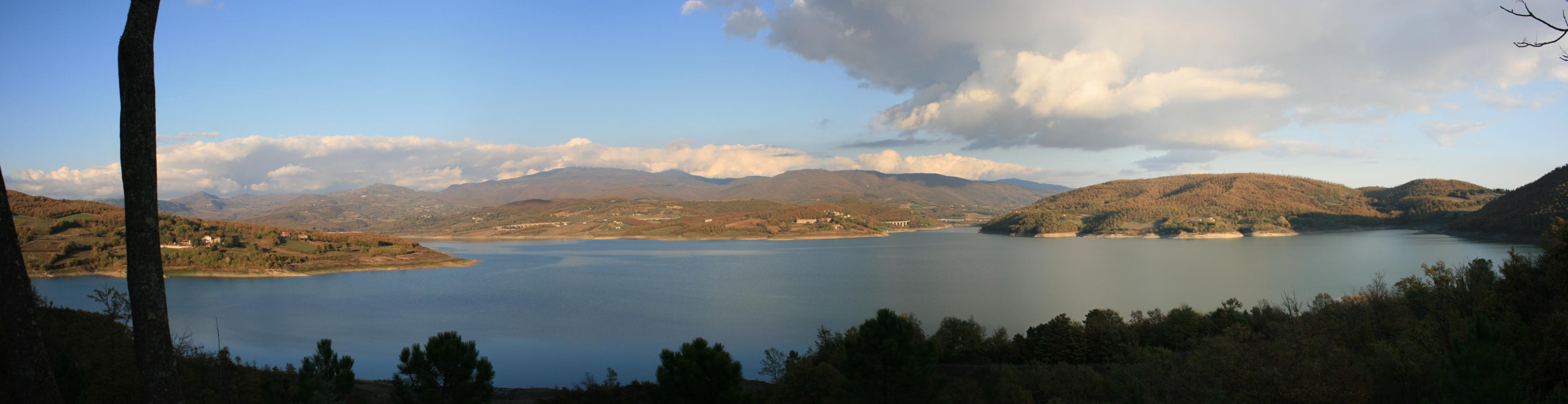
Lake of Montedoglio

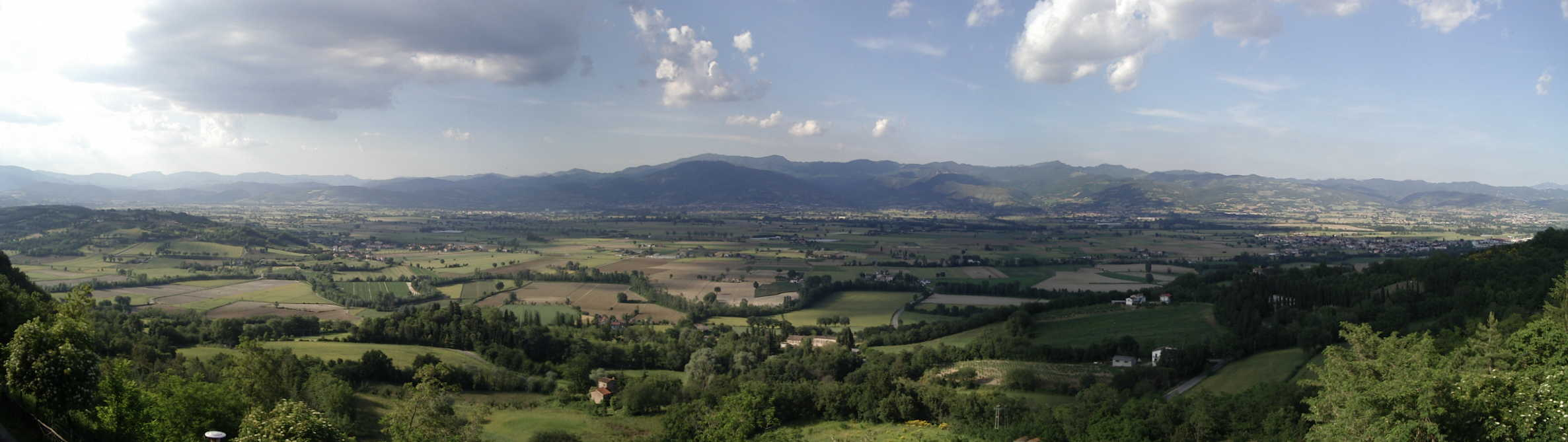
Alta valle del Tevere

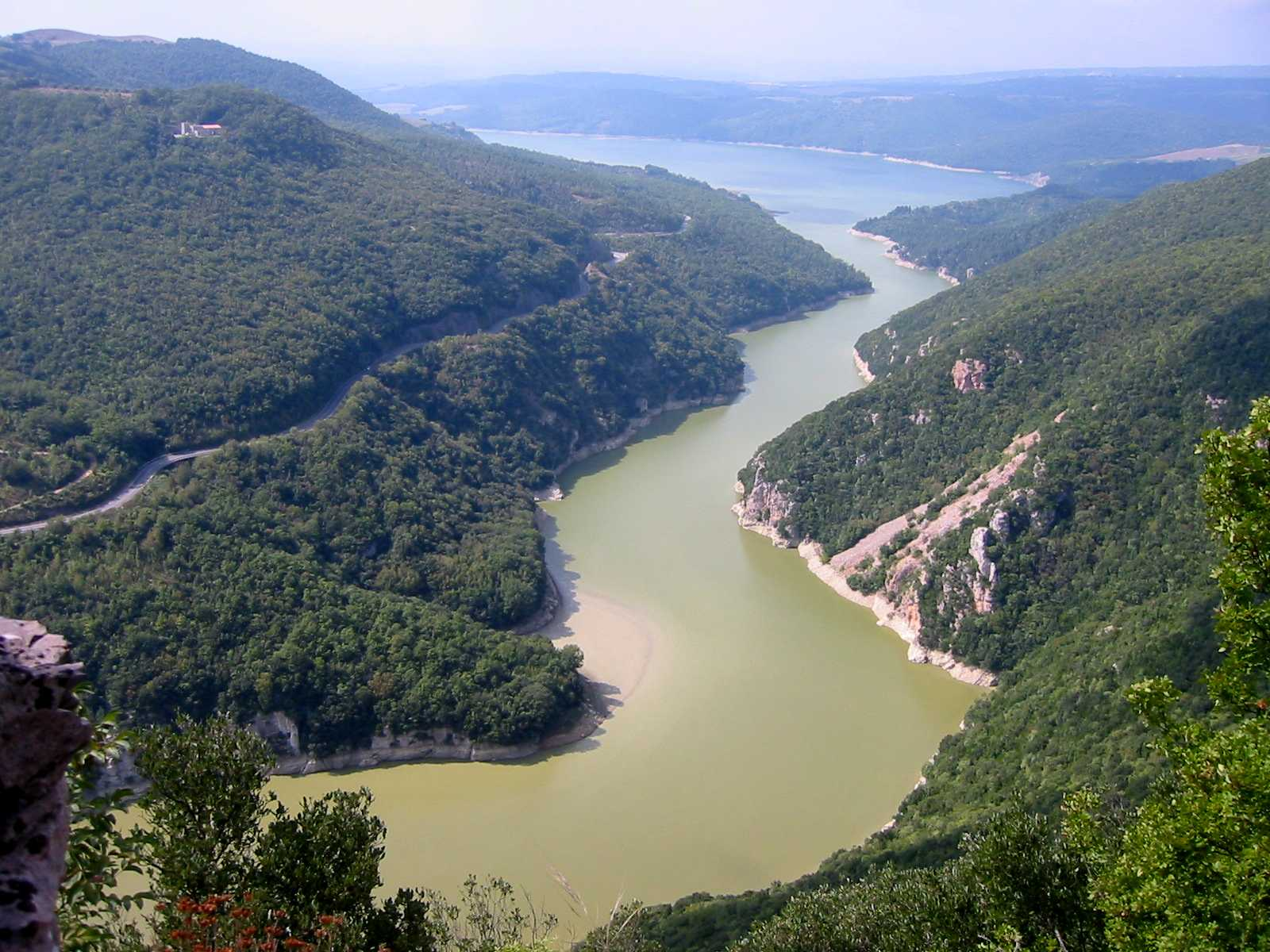
Lake of Corbara

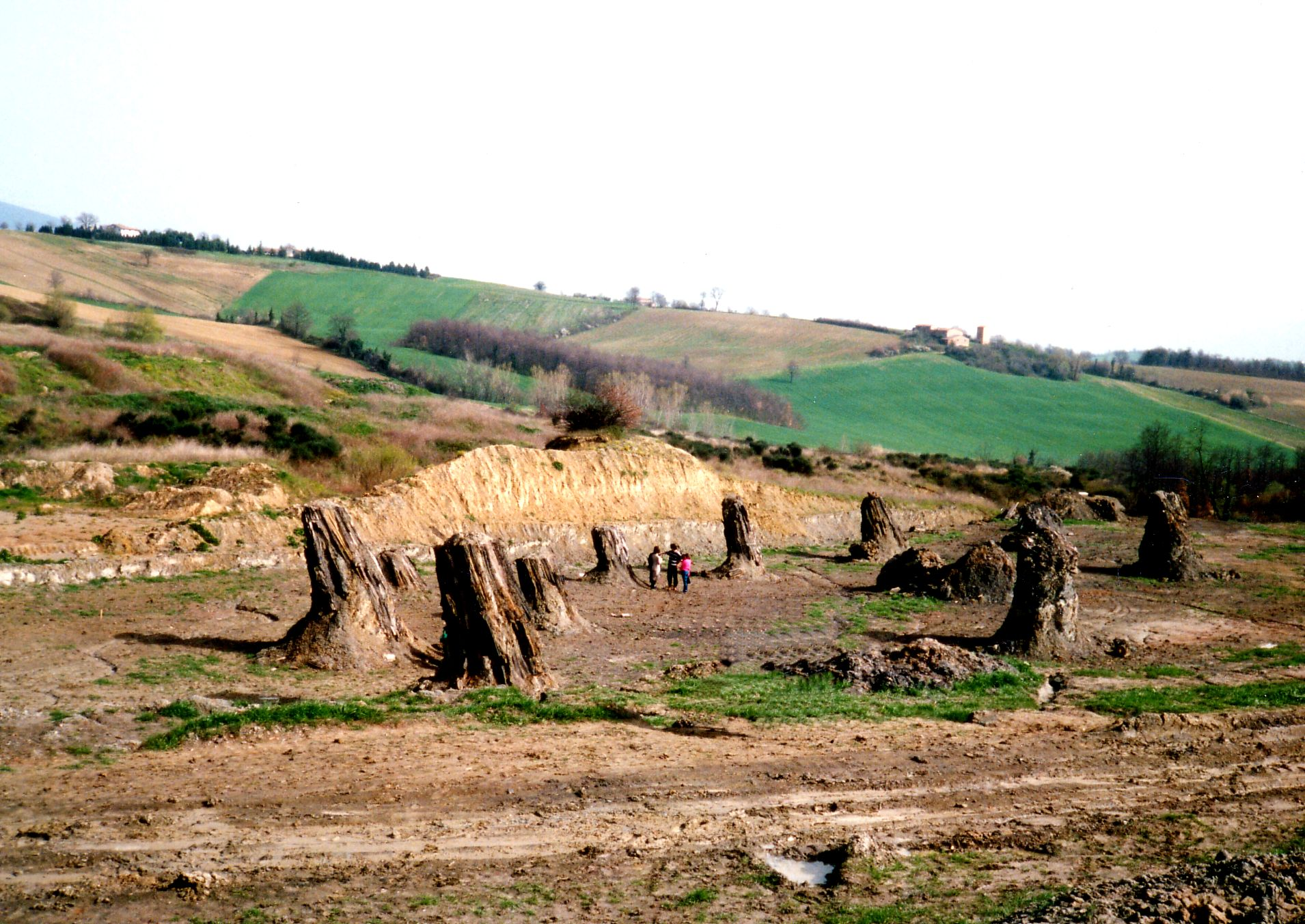
Fossil forest of Dunarobba

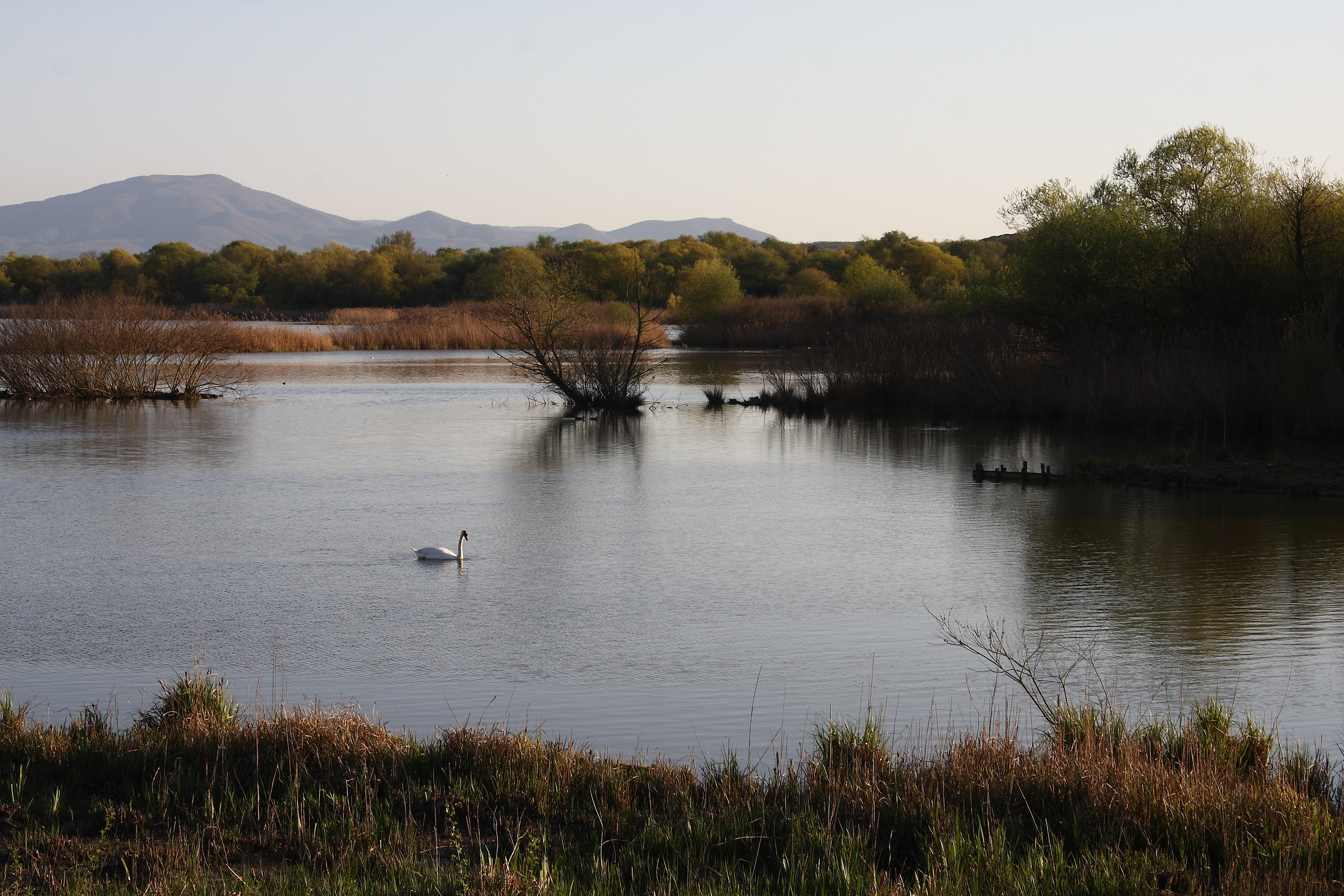
Lake of Alviano

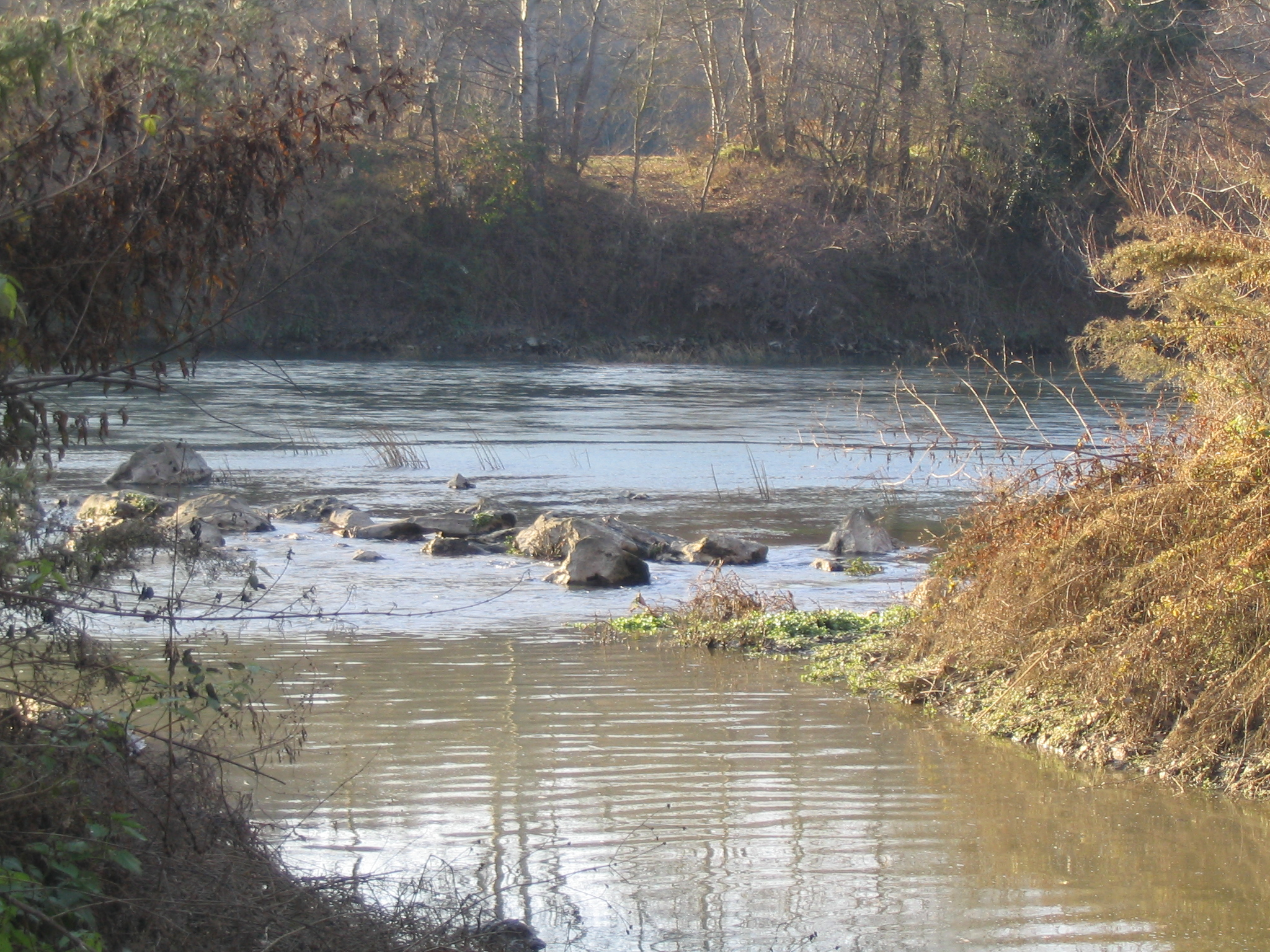
Capu l'Aia

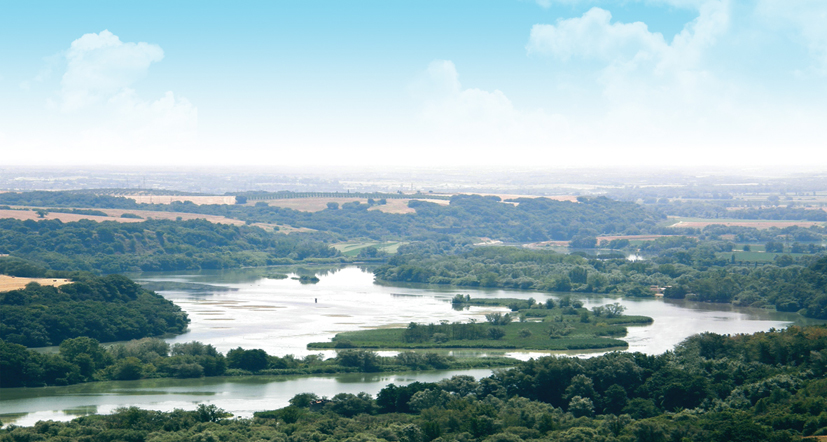
Lake of Nazzano

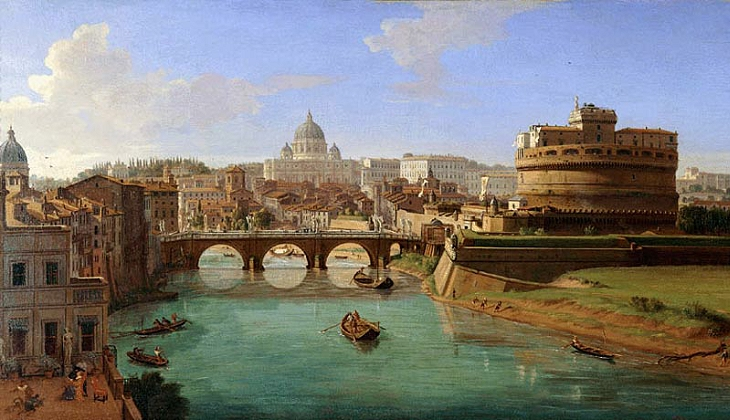
Boat towed with Burlak by arms from Pilorciatori

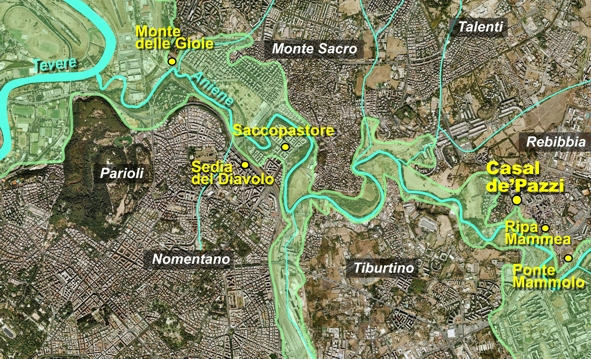
Paleolithic sites Tiber Valley - Aniene

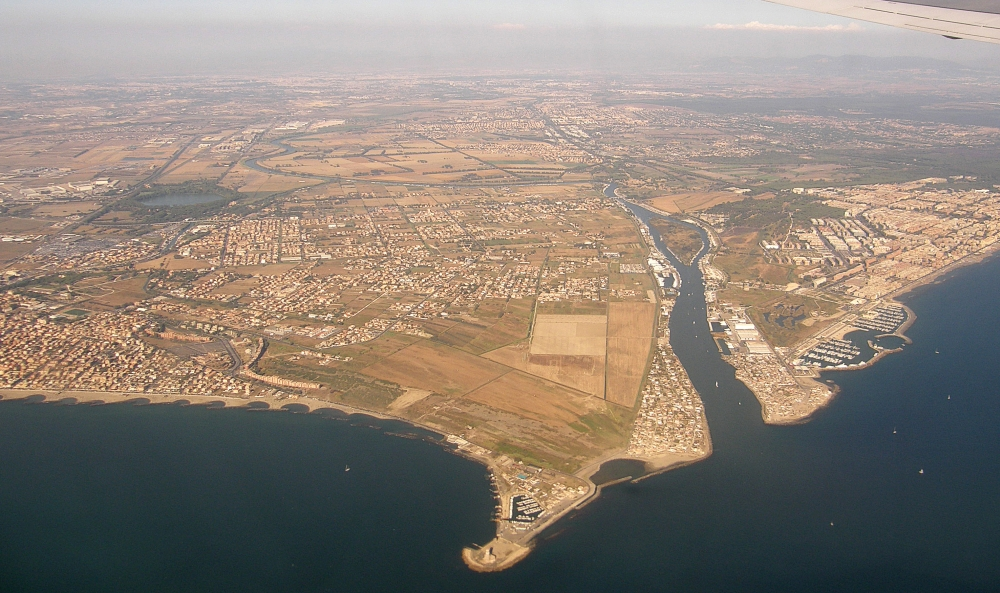
Delta of Tiber - between Fiumicino and Ostia

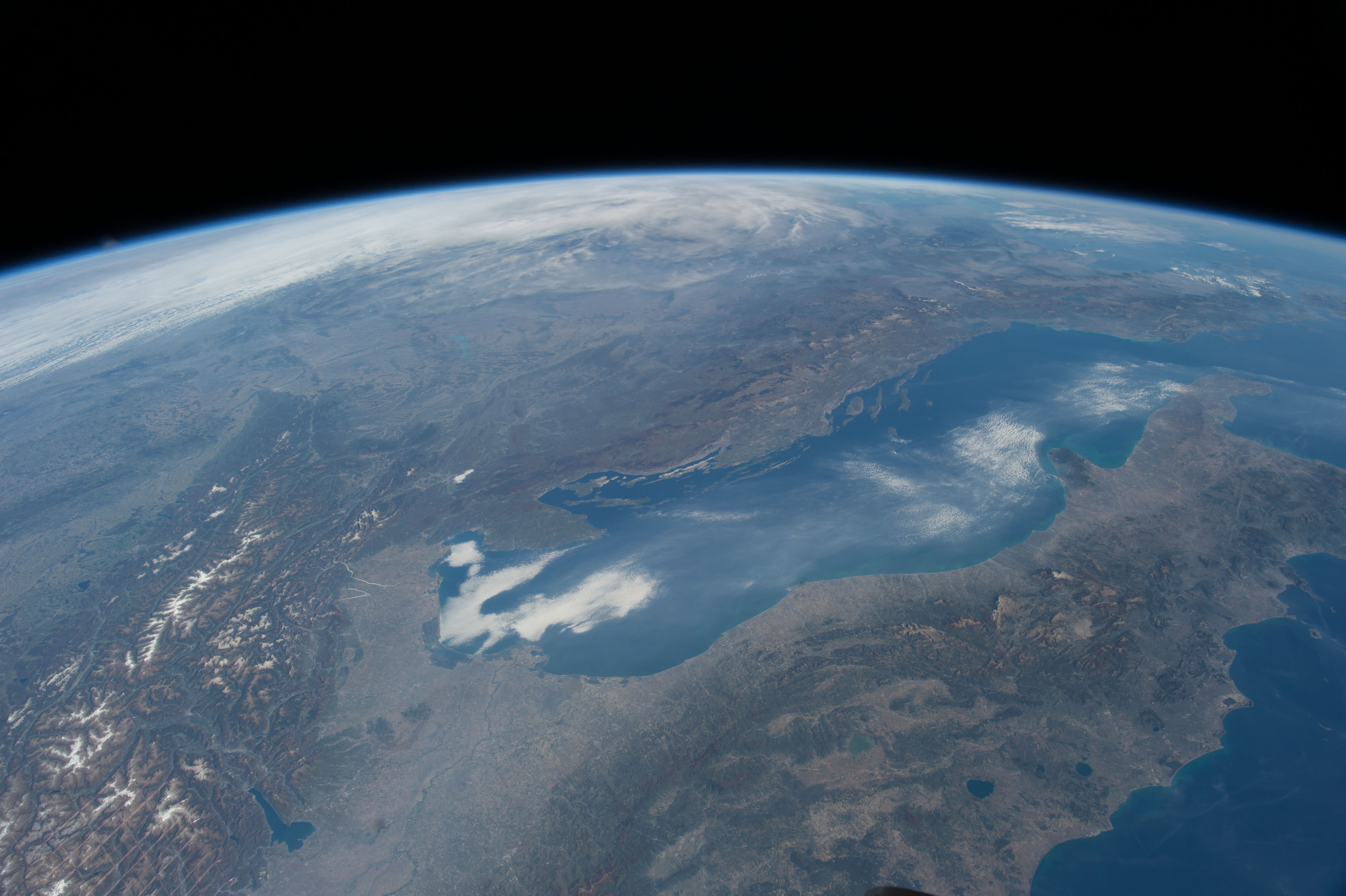
The Tiber Valley from Space
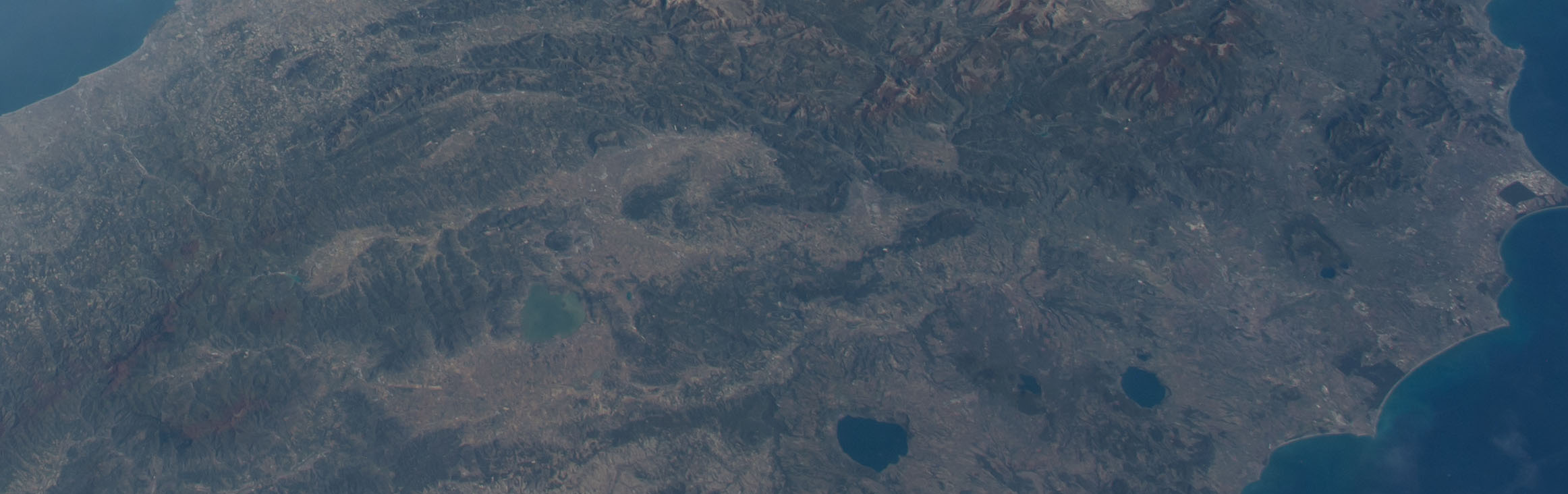
The Tiber Valley from the International Space Station ISS, Central Italy - Adriatic Sea - Apennines - Lake Trasimeno - the volcanic lakes of Bolsena, Vico, Bracciano and Albano - Rome, the mouth of the Tiber and the Tyrrhenian coast

== See also ==
- Valtiberina
