= Tor San Michele (Rome) =

Italian watchtower

- Via degli Atlantici, 00121 Ostia; Near Ostia (Rome) in Italy
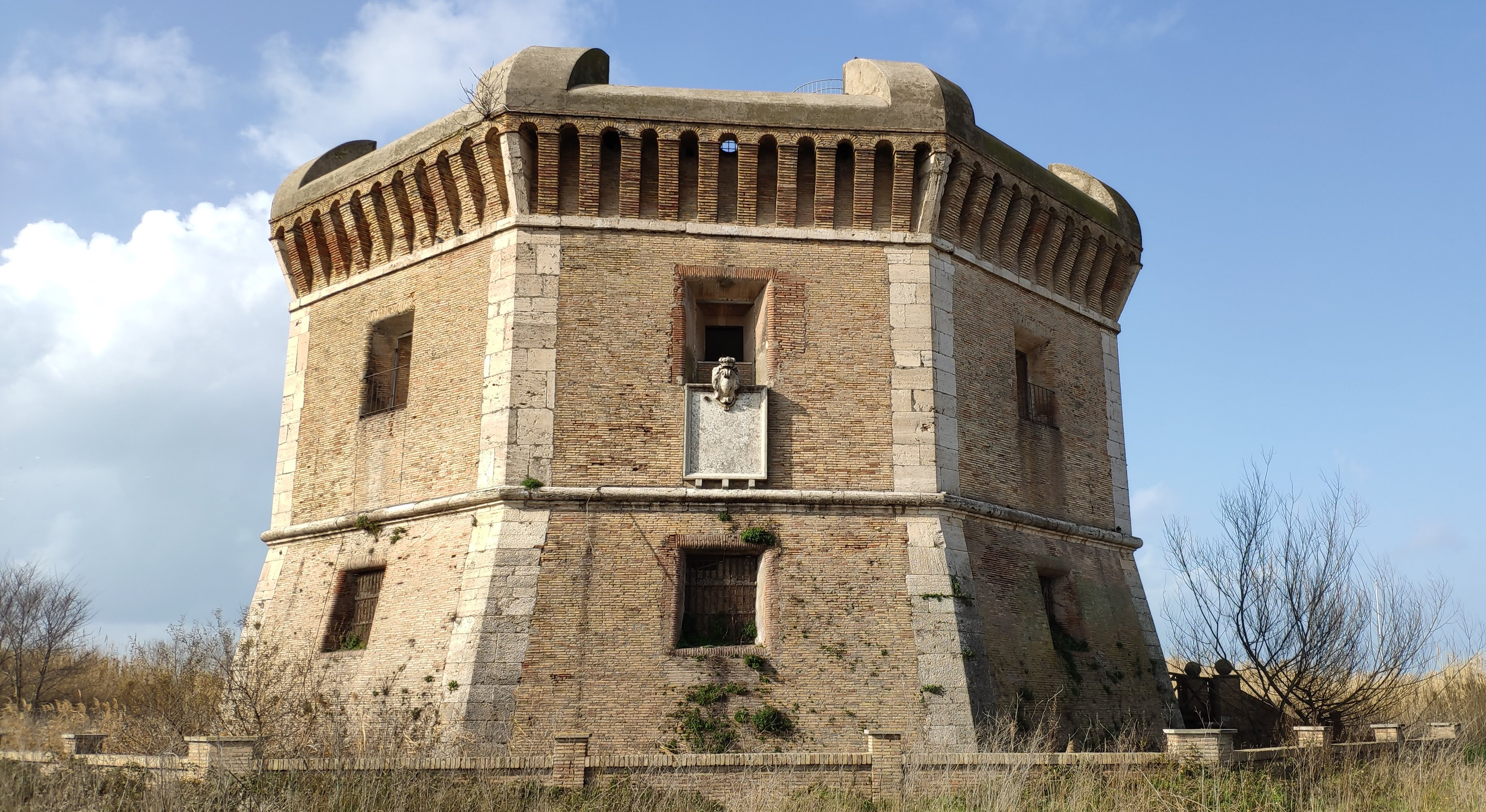

Site information
- Owner: Soprintendenza Speciale Archeologia Belle Arti e Paesaggio di Roma
- Open to the public: Yes, by reservation
- Condition: restored

Location
- Coordinates: 41°44′33″N 12°15′08″E
- Height: 18.5 metres (61 ft)

Site history
- Built: 1559–1568
- Built by: Pius IV; Michelangelo Buonarroti
- Materials: cement; brick; mortar; travertine

Tor San Michele, also known as Forte San Michele, is a coastal watchtower in Ostia, a frazione of the Municipality of Rome (Italy), rising near the mouth of the Tiber.

Built during the 16th century to remedy the deviation of the river following a disastrous flood, it was first used as a customs office and a lookout and defense station, then as a lighthouse for the Ostia Seaplane Base, until it fell into disuse after the end of World War II.

The monumental site was completely restored in 2021 and officially reopened to the public.

== History ==
After a disastrous flood, which occurred on 15 September 1557, the course of the Tiber changed radically near Ostia Antica, causing the fall into disuse of the castle of Julius II, which had been used until then as the seat of papal customs. Fearing of an incursion from the sea, Pope Pius IV ordered a revision of the coastal defense system, entrusting the task to the architect Francesco Laparelli; he fortified the medieval Tor Boacciana, which became the temporary seat of the customs offices, promoted the maintenance of the fortress and planned the construction of a tower near the mouth of the river.

The project was entrusted to Michelangelo (even if not all scholars agree in this attribution); the works for the construction of the tower began in 1559 and were completed in 1568 under the supervision of Nanni di Baccio Bigio, who took over after the death of his master in 1564. Brick, travertine and mortar were used to build the tower. Once the works were completed, Pope Pius V consecrated it to St. Michael the Archangel. According to documents preserved in the State Archives of Rome, in 1592 the tower was equipped with: half a culverin, two falconets, five swivel guns, as well as gunpowder and iron and lead round shots.

In August 1589 the tower had to face the arrival of some Saracen vessels, which nevertheless were able to move on due to the poor state of the artillery allocated there.

In 19th century the tower was visited by the theologist and historian Alberto Guglielmotti, who provided a detailed description of it, prior to the changes made in the following years, in his work History of papal navy.

It is not clear when the tower began to be used as a lighthouse; however it had this function inside the "Carlo del Prete" Seaplane Base, opened in 1928. Nonetheless, the construction of the latter involved the removal of the original paths that connected the tower to the salt works and other fortifications in the area.

The tower underwent some modifications in 1930, when the windows on the external walls – not provided for in the original project – were opened. Due to these changes, as well as to the geographical location and the composition of the ground, several consolidation works were necessary and some structural failures also occurred. It was used during World War II, first by the German–Italian forces and then by the allied ones, again with the function of lighthouse and sighting tower.

The tower was abandoned after the war and finally entrusted to the Superintendence for environmental and architectural heritage of Rome in 1994; it is considered a "state property of important interest". It is closed to the public; an extraordinary opening was carried out by some local associations on May 28, 2017, with guided tours and illustrations on the history of the building.

== Description ==
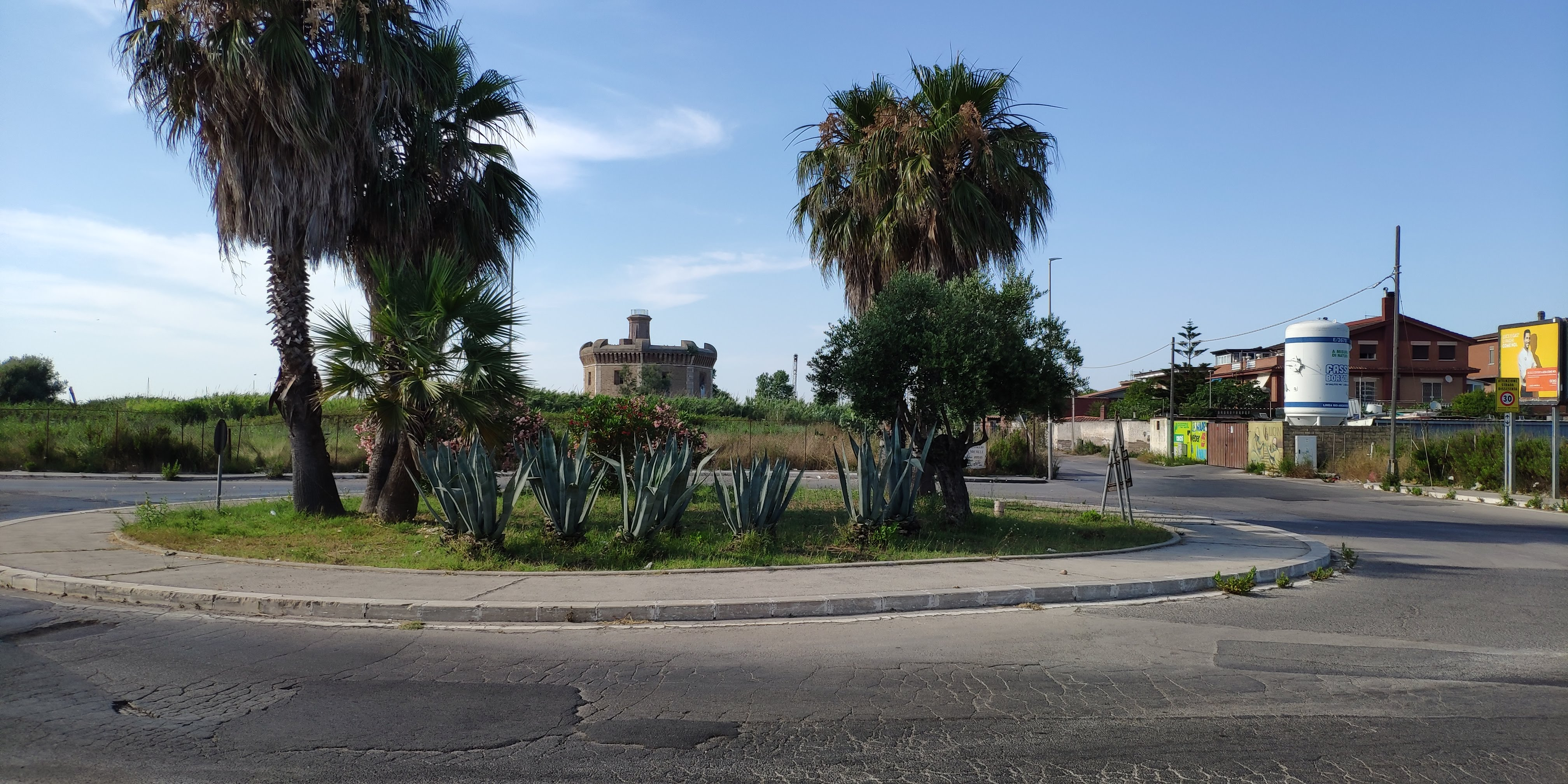
The tower from Via dell'Idroscalo.

Located on Via degli Atlantici, about a hundred meters from the river and more or less two kilometers from the sea, the tower was originally designed to be at a distance of 50 metres (160 ft) from the coast line.

It is a truncated pyramid with an octagonal base, 18 metres (59 ft) high and with a perimeter of 96 metres (315 ft); these are rather peculiar characteristics for a coastal tower, as they were normally circular or quadrangular in shape (such as the Tower of Palidoro in Fiumicino) and smaller in size. The building is surrounded by a moat.

The tower is spread over three floors. The basement is divided into 8 non-communicating rooms, used as warehouses for artillery pieces and ammunition and occasionally as temporary prisons, while a drain for rainwater runs in the center of the floor; the first floor is also divided into 8 rooms, which provided accommodation for the castellan and customs officers; finally, the top floor is occupied by the place-of-arms, showing a peculiar floor that slopes toward the center of the tower, so that the hits of the catapults, especially the torched ones, caused less damage. At the center of the tower there is a cavaedium with a diameter of 5.6 metres (18 ft), overlooked by the internal windows which, in the original project, were the only source of light for the interiors.
A concrete lighthouse, not included in the project by Michelangelo, rises on the top, in a decentralized position.

The doorway, the only wooden element, is raised about 4 metres (13 ft) from the ground and was initially accessible via a drawbridge, then replaced by a fixed bridge already in place at the time of Guglielmotti's visit in 19th century. Above it there is an inscription on marble bearing the year of completion and the reasons for the construction, as well as the family crest of Pope Pius V.
