= Francesco Salvolini =

Francesco Salvolini (Faenza 1810 – February 1838) (also known as François Salvolini) was a scholar of Ancient Egyptian hieroglyphs who worked with Jean-François Champollion on deciphering hieroglyphs near the end of the latter's life. He is known to have been in possession of some of Champollion's manuscripts and to have used them as a basis for his own subsequent publications on the subject, claiming the work as his own.

Salvolini became a student of Champollion in 1831, at the recommendation of Constanzo Gazzera; after having graduated in Oriental languages from the University of Bologna. During Champollion's final illness in 1832, Salvolini was given full access to the materials in his mentor's office. Shortly after Champollion died, his older brother Jacques Joseph collected together all of his younger brother's manuscripts, and realized that significant portions were missing. Suspicion immediately fell on Salvolini, who denied the charges leveled against him. Salvolini subsequently started to publish groundbreaking works on hieroglyphs that were met with acclaim.

By the time Jacques Joseph Champollion-Figeac started publishing the first volume of his late brother's Grammaire égyptienne in 1836, Salvolini was increasingly held in contempt by the academic community as it became clear that not all of the work was his own.

Salvolini died in February 1838, and the missing manuscripts of Champollion were discovered among his papers.

== Bibliography ==
- Analyse grammaticale raisonnée de différens textes anciens égyptiens, 1836
- Traduction et analyse grammaticale des inscriptions sculptées sur L'Obélisque égyptien de Paris, 1837
