= Cesi family =

Italian noble family

Cesi

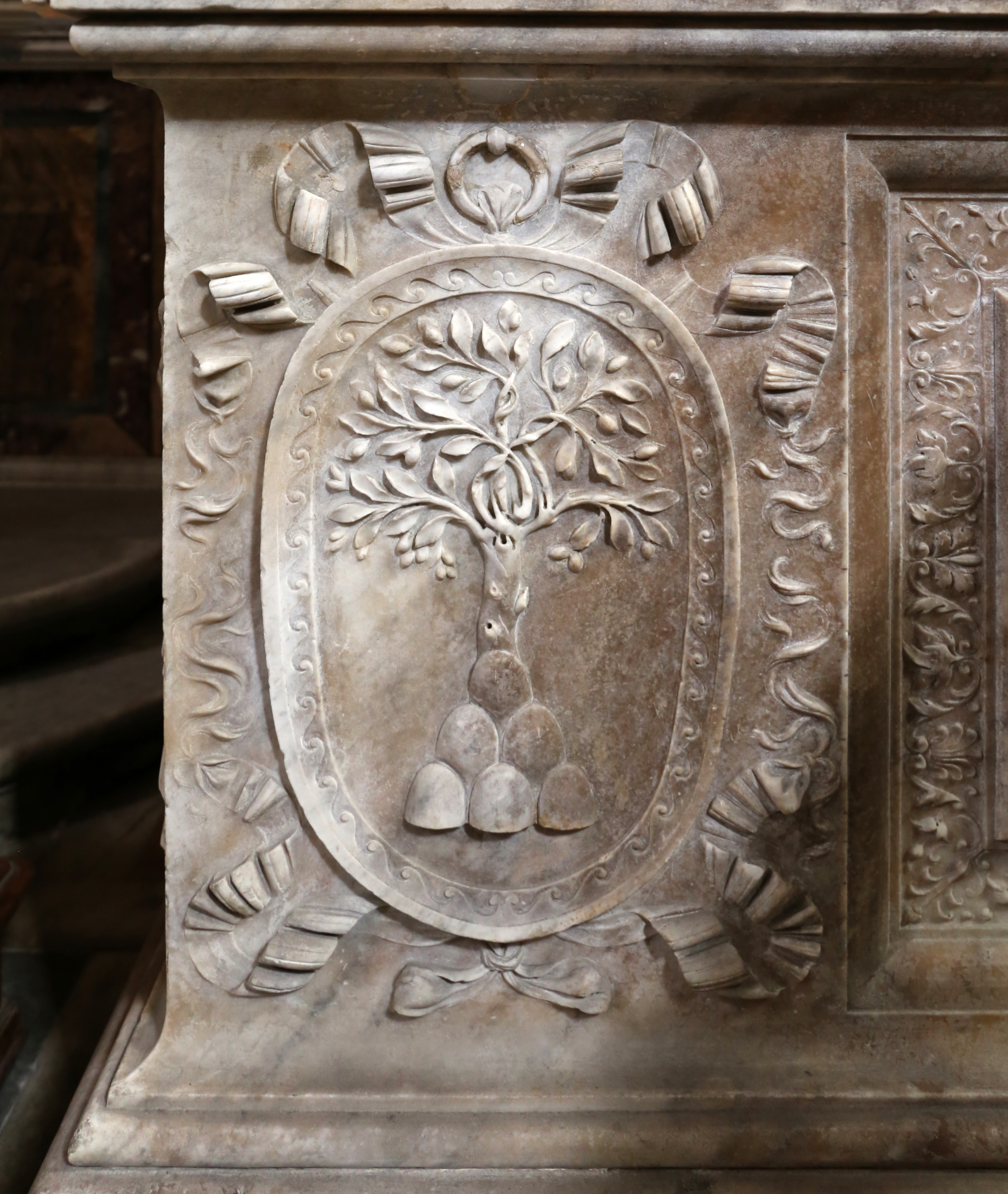
- Santa Maria della Pace (Rome) - Cesi Chapel - Reliefs by Simone Mosca
- Country: Papal States
- Current region: Italy
- Origin: Cesi, Terni; Papal States
- Founded: X century
- Founder: Pope Sylvester II
- Titles: Prince of San Polo; Prince of Sant'Angelo; Duke of Acquasparta; Duke of Selci; Duke of Ceri; Duke of Rignano; Marquis of Monticelli; Marquis of Riano; Marquis of Gavignano; Marquis of Oliveto; Count of Reschio; Count of Mezzanelli; Nobile Romano; Nobile di Terni; Nobile di Narni; Signore di Catalupo; Signore di Gavignano; Signore di Portaria; Signore di Civitella Cesi; Signore di Marcellina; Signore di Poggio Cesio
- Connected families: Orsini, Colonna, Barberini, Ruspoli, Caetani, Sforza, Savoia, Aldobrandini, Massimo, d'Altemps, Della Rovere, Salviati, Lante, Strozzi, Pico, Savelli
- Motto: Omnibus Idem
- Estates: Castle Cesi in Cesi, Terni; Palazzo Cesi in Acquasparta; Castle Orsini-Cesi in Sant'Angelo Romano; Castle Orsini-Cesi-Borghese in San Polo dei Cavalieri; Palazzo Barberini in Rome (originally owned by Giacomo Cesi); Palazzo Cesi-Gaddi in Rome; Palazzo Cesi-Armellini in Rome; Palazzo Berardi-Cesi-Muti in Rome; Palazzo Cesi-Salviati in Rome; Palazzo Cesi-Poli in Rome; Palazzo Cesi in Cesi; Palazzo Cesi in Todi; Castle Cesi-Ruspoli in Vignanello; Palazzo Cesi-Poniatowski in Rome; Palazzo Cesi-Massimo in Rignano; Castle Cesi-Boncompagni in Riano; Castle Cesi in Civitella Cesi; Castle Cesi in Mezzanelli; Palazzo Cesi-Pamphilj in Nettuno; Palazzo Cesi in Montecelio; Palazzo Cesi in Porta Cavalleggeri in Rome; Castle Cesi Marco Simone, Rome; Castle of Poggio; Castel of Gavignano; Palazzo Cesi, Bologna; Borgo di Portaria; Cesi Town in Umbria; Cesi Town in Mecerata; Cesi Town in Teramo; Cesi Neighborhood in Ancona; Cesi fazione in Serravalle di Chienti in the Marche; Public Monuments: Todi Cathedral in Todi; Church Santa Maria in Vallicella "Chiesa Nuova" in Rome; Church Santa Caterina dei Funari in Rome; Church San Fortunato, Todi; Church Santa Cecilia in Acquasparta; Church Santa Maria del Giglio in Acquasparta; Church of San Giuseppe in Acquasparta; Cesi Chapel in Basilica Santa Maria Maggiore in Rome; Cesi Chapel in Santa Maria della Pace in Rome; Cesi Chapel in Basilica di Santa Prassede in Rome; Cesi Chapel in Santa Caterina d'Alessandria in Palermo; Church Collegiata di Santa Maria della Presentazione in Vignanello; Cesi Chapel in Todi Cathedral; Cesi Chapel in Narni Cathedral; Cesi Chapel in Church Santa Cecilia in Acquasparta; Archiginnasio di Bologna; University of Bologna; Fountain of Neptune, Bologna; Cesi Fountain in Bologna; Cesi Fountain in Todi; Cesi Chapel in Church Santa Maria del Giglio in Acquasparta; Cesi Chapel in Church of San Giuseppe in Acquasparta; Cesi-Ruspoli Chapel in Church Collegiata di Santa Maria della Presentazione in Vignanello; Church dei Santi Filippo e Giacomo in Portaria; Via Federico Cesi in Rome; Piazza Federico Cesi in Rome; Cesi gardens in Rome
- Cadet branches: Marquis Cittadini-Cesi, Dukes of Acquasparta

The Cesi family is an Italian noble family which belonged to the high aristocracy of Rome and the Papal States.

== Origins ==
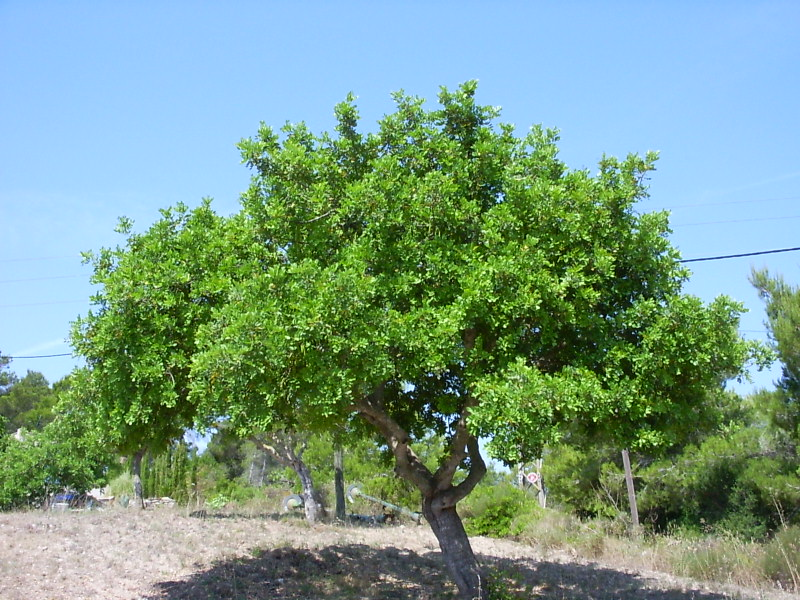
A carob (Ceratonia siliqua)

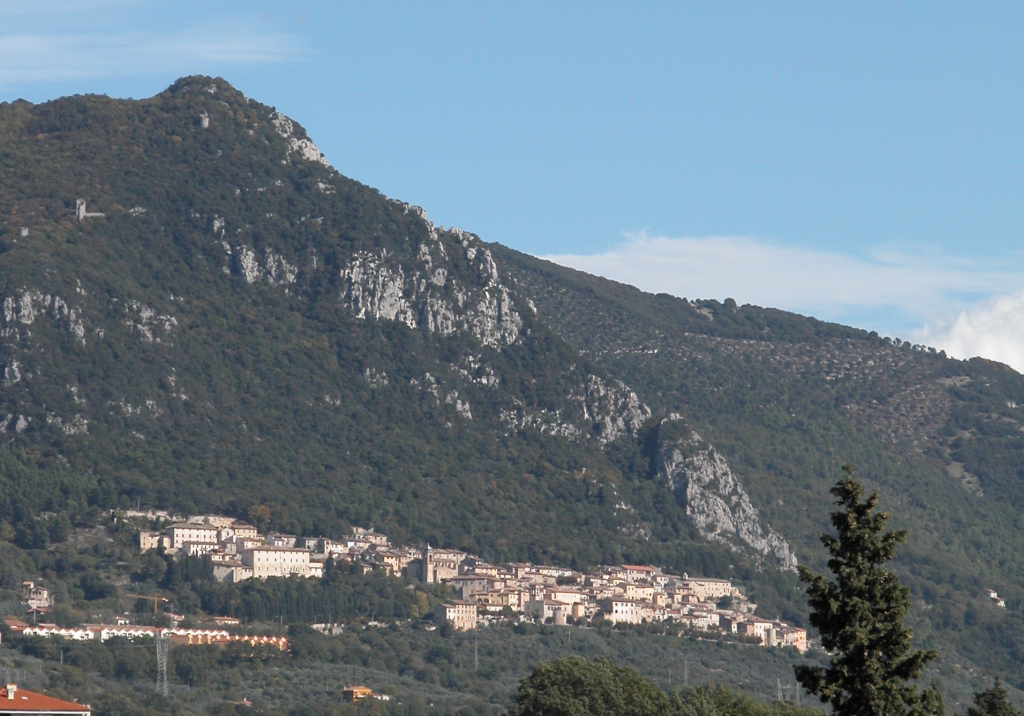
The town of Cesi in Umbria, origin of the family.

The Cesi family takes its surname from Cesi. The fiefdom of Cesi was originally part of the Lombard Duchy of Spoleto. The Cesi fief was of the Arnolfi family, the chief seat of the Terre Arnolfe. The Arnolfi family claimed descent from the Lombard Arnulf, vassal of Duke of Spoleto. The duchy was then annexed to the Papal States. It comes from the Latin word caesi and the Latin verb caedere. Contraction of the Lombard toponym Cesina, which indicated a coppice wood or a place cleared of woodland. The original and common coat of arms of the Cesi was a carob (Ceratonia siliqua) tree on six mountains.

== History ==
A map of Italy in 1494

A map of Italy in 1796

A map of Italy in 1843

According to the "Relation de Rome" of the French Ambassador to the court of Urban VIII, Amayden, the Cesi family was located in Umbria (with its main seat the castle of Cesi). Antonio Chitani of Cesi, the chief of the family, and his wife Angela Ternabili were slaughtered in the Church of St. Anthony Abbot, in the castle of Cesi, on the feast day of the saint, with all their relatives. Only their son Pietro (1422–1477), still in swaddling clothes, escaped the massacre. Pietro moved to Rome and later became a very famous consistory lawyer to the point of obtaining the office of podestà of Perugia first and then that of senator in Rome. The three sons born to Pietro, Bartolomeo, Pierdonato, and Angelo, respectively, originated three branches of the family.

The last of Pietro's sons, Angelo or Agnolo, married Franceschina Cardoli, a descendant on his mother's side of the famous condottiero Gattamelata; he himself was a very distinguished personage of his time, becoming a jurisconsult, professor of the Roman Archiginnassio, consistorial lawyer and senator like his father until he was noticed by Pope Julius II, who appointed him first apostolic secretary and then auditor of the apostolic chamber. He was also a splendid patron, commissioning Michelangelo to build the family chapel in the church of Santa Maria della Pace in Rome. His son, Maximilian Octavius, was bishop of Cervia, while two of his other sons, Federico and Paolo Emilio, were both cardinals.

Giangiacomo, Angelo's son, was decemvir at Todi and was noble of Terni. He took part in the siege of Florence in 1530, also distinguishing himself as a condottiero. Through his wife, Isabella Liviani d'Alviano, who bequeathed him his father's fiefdom, he was able to make an exchange with Pierluigi Farnese, receiving in exchange the fiefs of Acquasparta and Portaria.

Giangiacomo's son, Angelo, followed in his father's footsteps and was also a decemvir at Todi and a nobleman at Terni, embarking like his parent on a military career on behalf of the Church State. In 1569, during the reign of Pius V, he commanded a military expeditionary force in France to bring aid to Charles IX against the Huguenots. He distinguished himself in the capture of Poitiers where he later died in 1570. He had a palace in Rome in via della Maschera d'oro that later became the seat of his household and erected a grand mausoleum to his uncle, Cardinal Federico Cesi, in the church of Santa Maria Maggiore.

His sons were Bartolomeo, who later became archbishop of Conza, bishop of Tivoli and cardinal, and Federico, who first assumed the title of marquis of Monticelli. In favor of the latter, Pope Sixtus V erected the fiefdom of Acquasparta into a duchy in 1588, while Pope Paul V in 1613 granted him the principality over the marquisates of San Polo dei Cavalieri and Sant'Angelo. The latter married Princess Olimpia Orsini.

Federico (1562–1630), was the eldest son of the former and 2nd Duke of Acquasparta. His brother Firmino, became bishop of Rimini. His son, founder of the Accademia dei Lincei, would be known as Federico the Lyncean and would be one of the greatest scholars of the 17th century. He married Princess Artemisia Colonna in first marriage and Marchesa Isabella Salviati in second marriage.

The family grew and prospered until the second half of the 17th century when it sold most of its property to the Borghese family. At this point the branch of the dukes of Acquasparta was succeeded by the one originated by Bartolomeo with Giacomo di Giuseppe who in 1804 and then with his son, Luigi in 1821.

The Pierdonato branch ruled with the title of marquis and duke in several fiefs in the Sabina area, dying out in 1657 with the death of Francesco Maria Cesi, duke of Ceri and Selci, titles that returned to the main branch of the lineage.

== Notable members ==
=== Cesi cardinals ===
- Paolo Emilio Cesi (1481–1537)
- Federico Cesi (1500–1565), younger brother of Cardinal Paolo Emilio Cesi.
- Pier Donato Cesi (1521–1586), seniore (senior)
- Pier Donato Cesi (1583–1656), iuniore (junior)
- Bartolomeo Cesi (1566–1621)

=== Cesi bishops ===
- Bartolomeo Cesi (died 1537), Bishop of Narni until his death in 1537.

=== Cesi nobles ===
==== Princes of San Polo and Sant'Angelo (1613-1670), Dukes of Acquasparta and Marquesses of Monticelli (1588) ====
- Federico I Cesi (1562–1630), I prince of San Polo and Sant'Angelo, I duke of Acquasparta, I marquis of Monticelli.
- Federico II Cesi (1585–1630), II prince of San Polo and Sant'Angelo, II duke of Acquasparta, II marquis of Monticelli, scientist, naturalist and founder of the Accademia dei Lincei.
- Giovanni Cesi (died 1656), III prince of San Polo and Sant'Angelo, III duke of Acquasparta, III marquis of Monticelli.
- Federico III Cesi (died 1666), IV prince of San Polo and Sant'Angelo, IV duke of Acquasparta, IV marquis of Monticelli
- Giuseppe Angelo Cesi (died 1705), V prince of San Polo and Sant'Angelo, V duke of Acquasparta, V marquis of Monticelli. The fiefdom of San Polo and Sant'Angelo is sold with the relative title to the Borghese princes; the other titles of duke and marquis remain active.
- Federico IV Pierdonato Cesi (died 1762), VI duke of Acquasparta, VI marquis of Monticelli.
- Carlo Federico Cesi (died 1774), VII duke of Acquasparta, VII marquis of Monticelli.
- Federico V Cesi (1766–1799), VIII duke of Acquasparta, VIII marquis of Monticelli.
- Giacomo Cesi (died 1821), IX duke of Acquasparta, IX marquis of Monticelli.
- Luigi Cesi, X duke of Acquasparta, X marquis of Monticelli.
- Federico VI Cesi, XI duke of Acquasparta, XI marquis of Monticelli.
- Gerberto, XII duke of Acquasparta, XII marquis of Monticelli.
- Elvira, duchess of Acquasparta, married Marquis Gaspare Cittadini and gave rise to the Cittadini-Cesi lineage.

==== Dukes of Selci (1596) and of Ceri (c. 1612) ====
- Paolo Emilio Cesi (d. 1611), II duke of Selci (title acquired from the Orsini)
- Andrea Cesi (d. 1626), I duke of Ceri, III duke of Selci
- Francesco Maria Cesi (d. 1657), II duke of Ceri, IV duke of Selci. Upon his death, the title of Duke of Selci passed to the main family branch, while that of Duke of Ceri passed to the Borromeo family.

== Matrimonial alliances ==
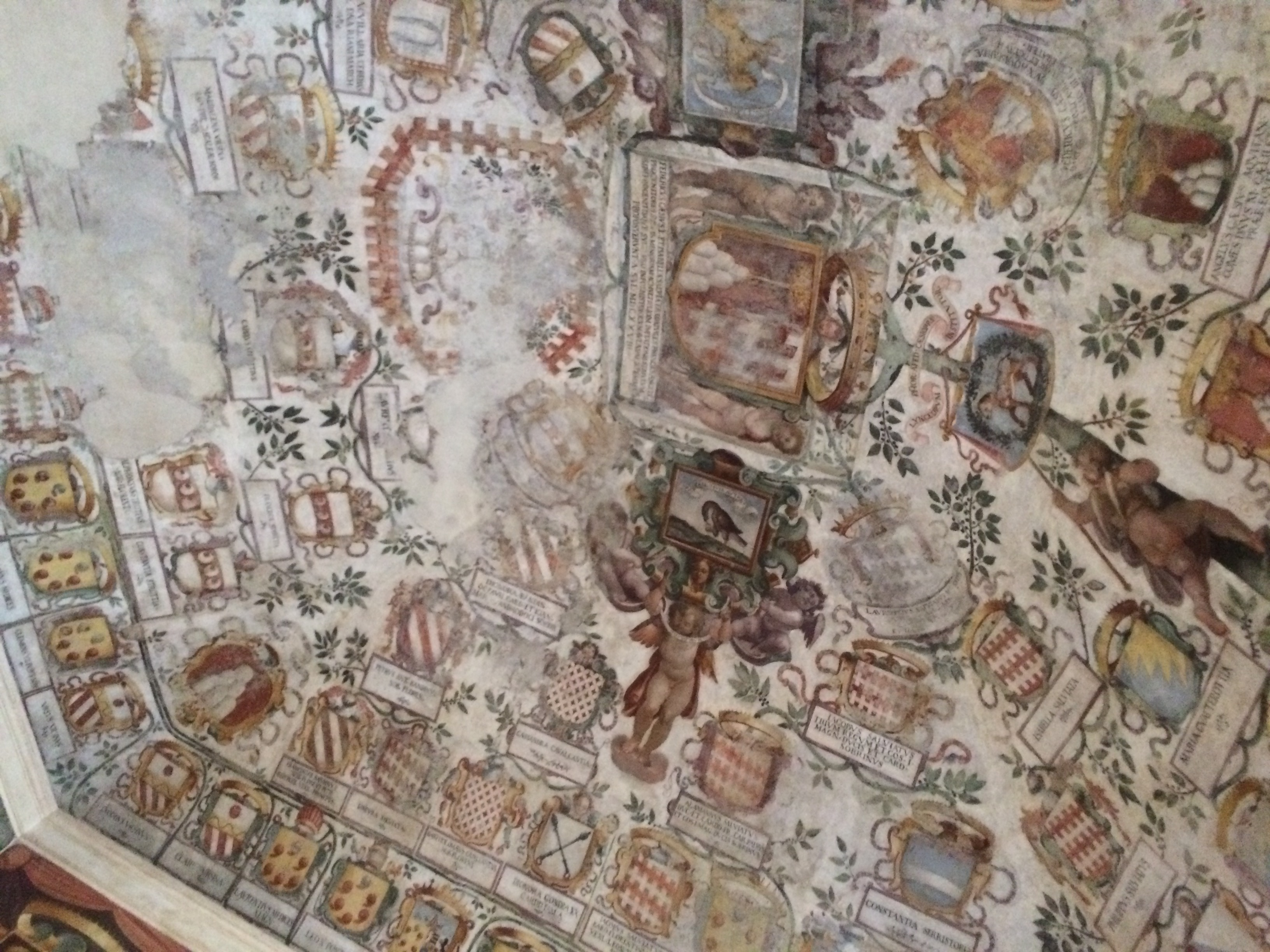

Don Giangiacomo (+1455)
= Donna Isabella d'Alviano, daughter of Count Bartolomeo d'Alviano and Pentesilea Baglioni dei Counts of Spello and Bettona

Don Angelo (1542–1570)
= Donna Beatrice Caetani, daughter of Don Bonifazio I 4° Duke of Sermoneta and of Caterina Pio di Savoia dei Princes of Carpi

Don Federico I (1562–1630)
= Donna Olimpia Orsini, daughter of Giovanni 2° Marquis of Lamentana and Porzia dei Counts dell'Anguillara

Don Federico II (1585–1630):
= Donna Artemisia Colonna, daughter of Don Francesco Prince of Palestrina and Donna Ersilia Sforza dei Counts of Santa Fiora
= Donna Isabella Salviati, daughter of Lorenzo Marquis of Giuliano and Donna Maddalena Strozzi dei Princes of Forano

Donna Olimpia (1618)
= Ludovico Lante della Rovere Marquis of Massa Luense
= Paolo Sforza Marquis of Proceno

Donna Caterina (1637)
= Giulio Della Rovere dei Marquis of San Lorenzo

Paolo Emilio (+1611)
= Porzia dell'Anguillara, daughter and heiress of Giampaolo dei Counts dell'Anguillara and Margherita Orsini dei Princes of Taranto
= Costanza degli Atti

Don Andrea (+1626)
= Donna Cornelia Orsini, daughter of Don Virginio Duke of San Gemini and Donna Giovanna Caetani dei Dukes of Sermoneta, already widow of Don Roberto Altemps Duke of Gallese

Don Francesco Maria (+1657)
= Giulia Pico Princess of Mirandola, daughter of Prince Alessandro Pico della Mirandola and Laura d'Este Princess of Modena and Reggio
= Donna Anna Caterina Aldobrandini, daughter of Don Pietro Duke of Carpineto and Donna Carlotta Savelli dei Princes of Albano

Donna Maria
= Don Giovanni Angelo d'Altemps, Duke of Gallese

Don Giovanni (+1656)
= Giulia Veronica Ravignani Sforza Manzuoli, daughter of Francesco Maria Count of Bagnolo, Todorano, Valdeponte, Corano, Ripoli, Confinente, Lagaro, Carpineta, Vado and Brigadello

Donna Isabella (1676–1753)
= Don Francesco Ruspoli, Prince of Cerveteri

Romolo (+1573)
= Timotea Orsini dei Dukes of San Gemini
= Venere D'Evoli dei Princes of Castroprignano

Donna Lucrezia (1577+)
= Giulio Landi Prince of Val di Taro

Donna Isabella
= Duke Ludovico Lante Montefeltro Della Rovere, Marquis of Massa Luense

Don Giuseppe Angelo (+1705)
= Donna Giacinta Conti, daughter of Don Carlo Duke of Poli and Guadagnolo and Donna Isabella Muti dei Dukes of Rignano

Don Federico Pierdonato (+1762)
= Donna Silvia Maria Teresa Muti, daughter of Don Giacomo Duke of Rignano and Virginia Caffarelli, already widow of Don Taddeo Barberini, Prince of Palestrina

Don Carlo Federico (+1774)
= Maria Vittoria Spada, daughter of Marquis Clemente of Caste Viscardo and Maria dei Counts Rocci

Don Federico (+1771)
= Maria Anna Massimo, daughter of Marquis Emilio Massimo and Maria dei Counts Bernardini Ferretti, who became heiress to the Cesi's Dukes of Rignano title, and transmitted it to her nephews from the Massimo family

Don Federico (+1799)
= Matilde Malatesta, daughter of Felice Antonio Count of Sogliano

Donna Nicolosa (1550+)
= Onofrio Santacroce, Duke of San Gemini

Pietro Donato detto Pierdonato (+1504)
= Lucrezia degli Atti

Paolo Emilio (+1611)
= Porzia dell'Anguillara, daughter and heiress of Giampaolo Count dell'Anguillara and Margherita Orsini dei Princes di Taranto
= Costanza degli Atti

Donna Anna Maria (+1647)
= Don Michele Damasceni Peretti, Prince of Venafro

Don Marcantonio
= Paola Savelli dei Princes of Albano, daughter of Tullio Savelli and Violante Orsini

Don Federico (+ 1620)
= Olimpia Orsini, daughter of Giordano Orsini Duke of San Gemini

Francesco (+1646)
= Margherita Ravignani Sforza Manzuoli, daughter of Francesco Maria Count of Bagnolo, Todorano, Valdeponte, Corano, Ripoli, Confiente, Lagaro, Carpineta, Vado and Brigadello

Giovanni (+ 1531)
= Camilla Spada dei Marquis of Gerbeuville

== Bibliography ==
- Theodore Amayden (c. 1620). Relation de Rome (in French).
- Gottardo Garollo (1907). Dizionario biografico universale (in Italian). Vol. 1. Milano: Ulrico Hoepli.
