= Rome metropolitan area =

Rome urban area
- urban area
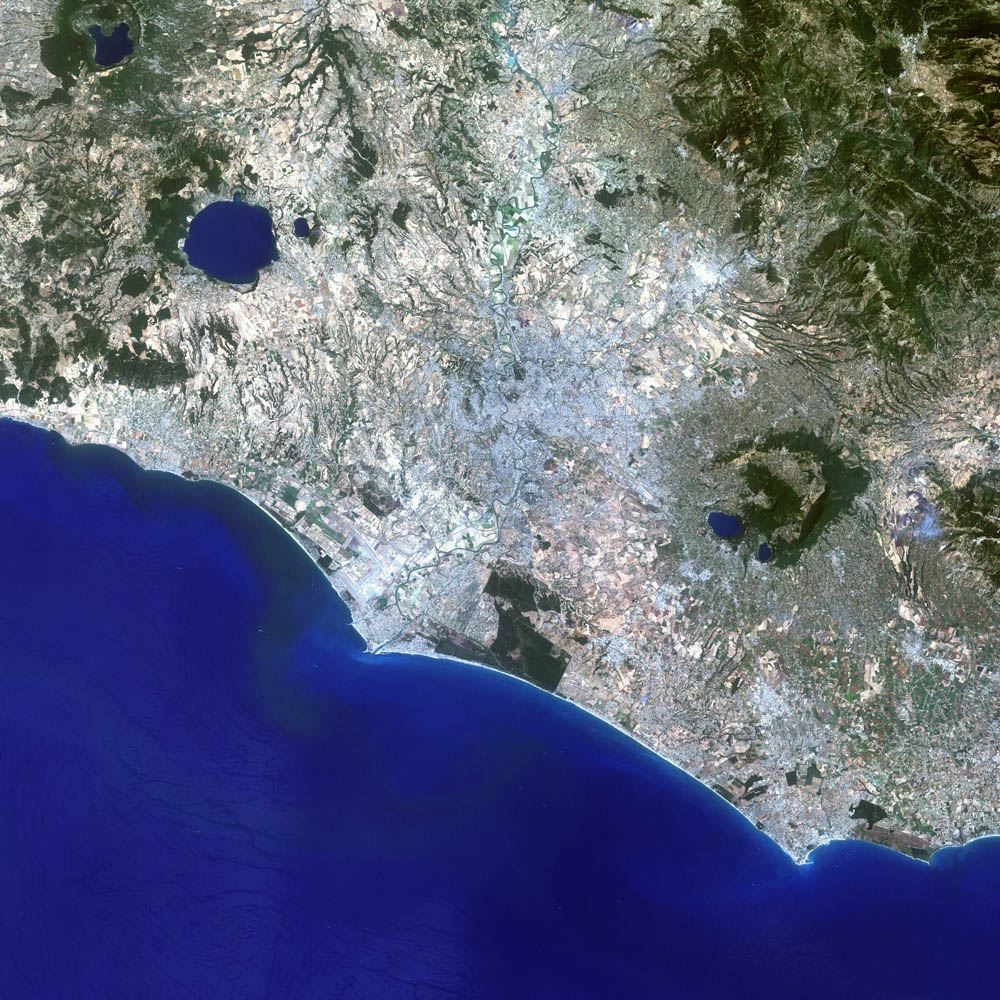
- Satellite picture of the Rome metropolitan area
- Country: Italy; Vatican City (in its entirety)
- Region: Lazio
- Core city: Rome

Area
  - Metro: 2,119 km^{2} (818 sq mi)

Population
  - Metro: 3,425,000▲
  - Metro density: 1,616/km^{2} (4,190/sq mi)

GDP
  - Metro: €163.42 billion (2021)
- Time zone: UTC+1 (CET)

The Rome metropolitan area is a statistical area that is centred on the city of Rome, Italy. It consists of a part of the Metropolitan City of Rome Capital (formerly known as the Province of Rome) and a single comune, Aprilia, in the neighbouring Province of Latina. Both provinces are part of the region of Lazio. The metropolitan area does not have any administrative designation or function unlike the Metropolitan City of Rome Capital.

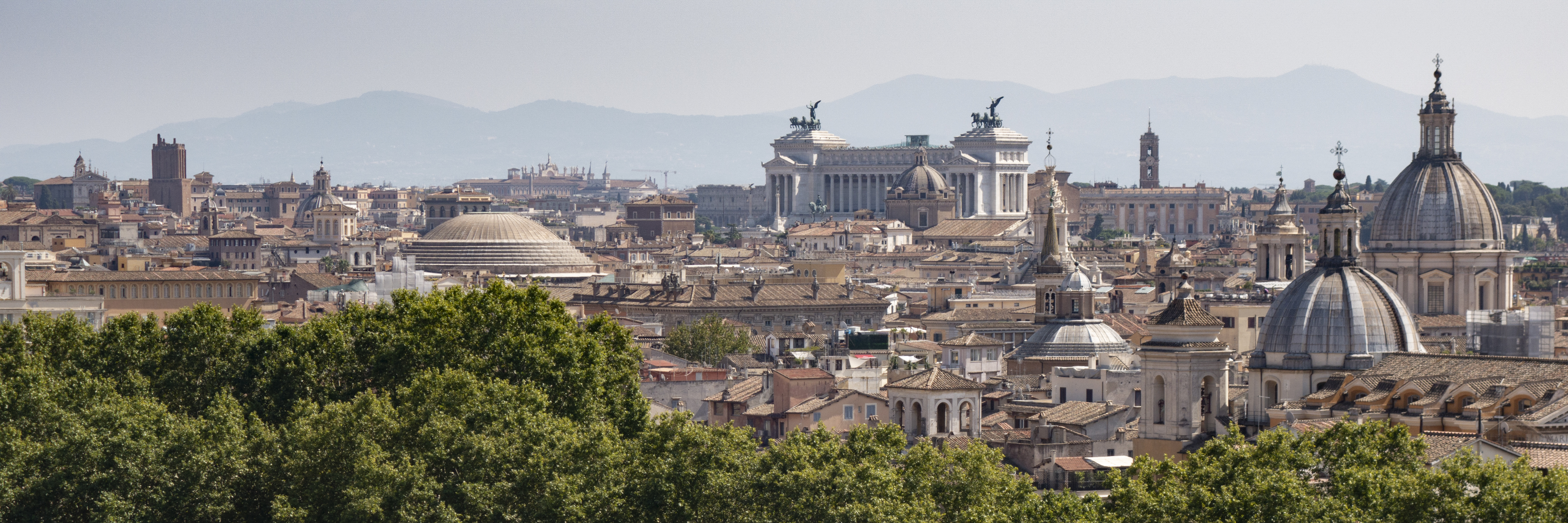
Skyline of Rome, the heart of the metropolitan area

== Composition ==
The Rome metropolitan area includes the city of Rome and 59 municipalities. It is the most populous in Italy with a population of 4,353,738 as of 2017. All are within the Metropolitan City of Rome Capital except Aprilia in the Province of Latina. The most important of these by population are: Guidonia Montecelio, Aprilia, Fiumicino, Tivoli, Ciampino, and Velletri, as shown in the table below.

=== Municipalities ===
| Province | Municipality | Area (in km²) | Population |
|---|---|---|---|
Lazio
| Metropolitan City of Rome Capital | Rome | 1,285 | 2,751,125 |
| Metropolitan City of Rome Capital | Albano Laziale | 23.8 | 39,702 |
| Metropolitan City of Rome Capital | Anguillara Sabazia | 74.91 | 19,145 |
| Metropolitan City of Rome Capital | Ardea | 50 | 49,329 |
| Metropolitan City of Rome Capital | Ariccia | 18 | 18,083 |
| Metropolitan City of Rome Capital | Artena | 54 | 13,616 |
| Metropolitan City of Rome Capital | Castel Madama | 28.5 | 7,343 |
| Metropolitan City of Rome Capital | Castel Gandolfo | 14 | 8,786 |
| Metropolitan City of Rome Capital | Cerveteri | 134.43 | 34,912 |
| Metropolitan City of Rome Capital | Ciampino | 11 | 38,685 |
| Metropolitan City of Rome Capital | Colonna | 3.5 | 4,347 |
| Metropolitan City of Rome Capital | Fiumicino | 222 | 81,885 |
| Metropolitan City of Rome Capital | Fonte Nuova | 20.1 | 32,737 |
| Metropolitan City of Rome Capital | Formello | 31 | 13,536 |
| Metropolitan City of Rome Capital | Frascati | 22 | 22,777 |
| Metropolitan City of Rome Capital | Gallicano nel Lazio | 26 | 5,707 |
| Metropolitan City of Rome Capital | Genazzano | 32 | 5,881 |
| Metropolitan City of Rome Capital | Genzano di Roma | 18 | 22,712 |
| Metropolitan City of Rome Capital | Grottaferrata | 18 | 20,709 |
| Metropolitan City of Rome Capital | Guidonia Montecelio | 79 | 89,191 |
| Metropolitan City of Rome Capital | Labico | 11.8 | 5,571 |
| Metropolitan City of Rome Capital | Ladispoli | 26 | 42,034 |
| Metropolitan City of Rome Capital | Lanuvio | 43.9 | 12,802 |
| Metropolitan City of Rome Capital | Lariano | 27 | 13,218 |
| Metropolitan City of Rome Capital | Marino | 26 | 46,481 |
| Metropolitan City of Rome Capital | Mentana | 24 | 22,572 |
| Metropolitan City of Rome Capital | Monte Compatri | 24.4 | 11,825 |
| Metropolitan City of Rome Capital | Monte Porzio Catone | 9.4 | 8,827 |
| Metropolitan City of Rome Capital | Monterotondo | 40 | 41,105 |
| Metropolitan City of Rome Capital | Pomezia | 107 | 64,268 |
| Metropolitan City of Rome Capital | San Cesareo | 22 | 16,177 |
| Metropolitan City of Rome Capital | Palestrina | 46.8 | 22,093 |
| Metropolitan City of Rome Capital | Rocca Priora | 28 | 12,007 |
| Metropolitan City of Rome Capital | Tivoli | 68 | 54,908 |
| Metropolitan City of Rome Capital | Sant'Angelo Romano | 21 | 4,828 |
| Metropolitan City of Rome Capital | Rocca di Papa | 40 | 17,669 |
| Metropolitan City of Rome Capital | Valmontone | 40 | 15,710 |
| Metropolitan City of Rome Capital | Velletri | 113 | 52,543 |
| Metropolitan City of Rome Capital | Zagarolo | 28 | 18,614 |
| Province of Latina | Aprilia | 178,11 | 75,440 |
| TOTAL | | 3.089,65 | 4,225,089 |

== See also ==
- Metropolitan areas of Italy
- Metropolitan City of Rome Capital topics
