= Pier Donato Cesi =

Pier Donato Cesi may refer to:

- Pier Donato Cesi (cardinal, born 1522), Italian Cardinal-Priest of Sant'Anastasia
- Pier Donato Cesi (cardinal, born 1583), Italian Crown Cardinal of Sicily
