= Angelo Stazzi =

Italian serial killer (born 1945)

- Born: 25 December 1945 (age 80); Rome, Province of Rome, Kingdom of Italy
- Other name: "The Angel of Death"
- Conviction: Murder (6 counts)
- Penalty: Life imprisonment plus 24 years imprisonment

Details
- Victims: 6–8
- Span of crimes: 2001–2009
- Country: Italy
- State: Rome
- Date apprehended: 28 October 2009
- Imprisoned at: Rebibbia Prison, Rebibbia, Rome

Angelo Stazzi (born 25 December 1945), known as The Angel of Death (Italian: L'Angelo della morte), is an Italian serial killer who murdered his mistress in 2001, later followed by a series of murders against patients at a nursing home he committed between 2008 and 2009. Convicted of six of the eight deaths he was accused of, Stazzi was subsequently sentenced to life imprisonment.

== Early life ==
Little is known about Stazzi's early life. Born on 25 December 1945 in Rome, he married in 1976 and had two daughters. For twenty-six years, Stazzi worked at the "Gemelli" clinic before being laid off in 1996, after which he moved to Montelibretti. There, he became a nurse, in addition to occasionally working in a local center-right civic list and later as a councilor for Forza Italia.

== Murders ==
=== Maria Teresa Dell'Unto ===
On 29 March 2001, Stazzi's 58-year-old mistress Maria Teresa Dell'Unto, a fellow nurse at the "Gemelli" clinic, left home around 9:30 AM, went to the Anguillara Sabazia station and never returned. Shortly after her disappearance, between 2 April and 4 June 2001, Dell'Unto's family received a letter with a wedding ring inside and two telegrams sent from Turin. In it, the author claimed to be Maria and requested that her family do not look for her. The wedding ring and the telegrams were seized by the authorities, who verified that the ring was the one Dell'Unto had been given by her first husband, Giancarlo Mari, who died in 1981.

As he was close to Dell'Unto and her family, Stazzi was initially investigated, but the entire case was dismissed in 2005, as authorities concluded that the woman had left of her own volition. In January 2009, however, the case was reopened after renewed attention was brought to it by the television programme Chi l'ha visto?, which highlighted the improbable circumstances for a voluntary disappearance. According to multiple testimonies, she was planning to advance her career in the long-term and shortly before disappearing, she had taken a chicken out of the refrigerator and put it to thaw in the sink, an action which suggested that she would eventually return.

Suspicion against Stazzi intensified after a female acquaintance living in Turin claimed to the authorities that she had been paid by him to write the telegrams and throw off investigators. In addition, Stazzi had told the authorities that on the day of the disappearance he was in Montelibretti, but when his phone records were checked, his location was placed at Anguillara Sabazia, the place where Dell'Unto was last seen. Finally, it was discovered that on the morning of her disappearance, her cell phone was turned off for hours and then turned back on in the Montelibretti area, where Stazzi lived.

Dell'Unto's body was eventually found buried inside a chicken coop in Stazzi's house. Later on, Stazzi would claim that while he was indeed responsible for her death, it was an accident – supposedly, he pushed her during an argument, upon which Dell'Unto hit her head and died. His explanations were disregarded, as it was established by investigators that he had killed her to avoid paying back loans worth 9 million lire.

=== Villa Alex deaths ===
Whilst he was being actively investigated in the Dell'Unto case, Stazzi found employment as a nurse at the "Villa Alex" nursing home in Sant'Angelo Romano. While working there, he was regarded very positively by his patients, who commended him for being very attentive and even offering to drive them in his own cars so they can get their tests done.

On 28 October 2009, he was arrested and charged for the deaths of seven patients at the facility that occurred between December 2008 and September 2009, all of whom died in a coma induced by fatal amounts of insulin. The victims' names were released, but the exact age and date of death for most of them is unclear – they were Caterina Candidi, Loira Zoppi, Carmela Antonelli, Lucia Pia Vita, Gregorio Ferrante, Evaristo Massardi and Maria Teresa Cutullè.

The motive for these murders was never concretely established, but during the trial, the prosecutor concluded that Stazzi was a delusional narcissist who sought to repeatedly commit what he probably considered to be the "perfect crime". Alternative suggestions speculated that there might have been a financial incentive as well, as Stazzi was given tips from the funeral homes to which he reported the deaths.

It also emerged that Stazzi also killed the dog of a patient at Villa Alex by injecting it with two shots of insulin, supposedly because the animal was causing too much noise.

Shortly after his arrest, Stazzi admitted to killing Dell'Unto, but categorically denied responsibility for the deaths at Villa Alex. In one interview with the media, he claimed to have provided the name of another employee of the nursing home who he believed was the true killer. His account was not believed, as another nurse from another facility he worked at, Villa Gregna, reported that Stazzi had attempted to administer a fatal dose of insulin to an unsuspecting patient. When his house in Montelibretti was searched, investigators found an insulin kit stashed inside a glass cabinet.

== Trial and imprisonment ==
On 30 September 2010, Stazzi was remanded for trial for the murder of Maria Teresa Dell'Unto. He was convicted of the murder on 22 December 2011 and sentenced to 24 years imprisonment, in addition to being ordered to provide financial compensation to her three children.

In 2012, Stazzi was tried for the deaths at Villa Alex, but was found guilty on five of the counts. He was then sentenced to life imprisonment on 26 March 2014, with him filing an appeal against the verdict. The appeal was rejected by the Supreme Court of Cassation on 13 July 2016, effectively finalizing his sentence, which he is serving at the Rebibbia Prison in Rome.

== In the media and culture ==
The disappearance and subsequent murder of Maria Dell'Unto was covered on an episode of the TV programme Commissari - Sulle tracce del male, which aired in 2019.

== See also ==
- List of serial killers by country
