= Guidonia Montecelio =

- Comune
- Comune di Guidonia Montecelio
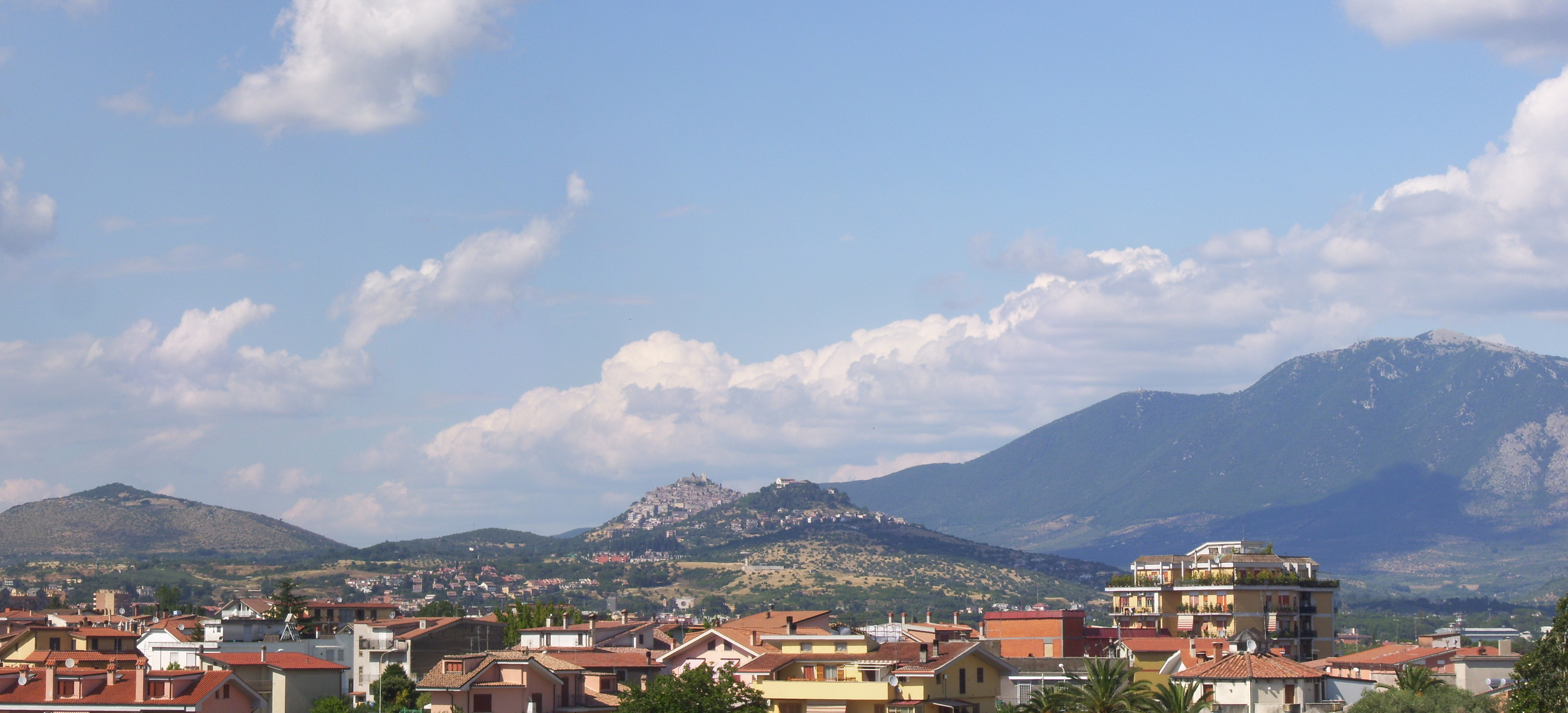
- Panorama of Guidonia

- Coat of arms

- Guidonia within the Metropolitan City of Rome Capital

- Location within Italy Location within Lazio
- Coordinates: 42°00′N 12°43′E
- Country: Italy
- Region: Lazio
- Metropolitan city: Rome (RM)
- Frazioni: Albuccione, Bivio di Guidonia, Colle Fiorito, Colleverde, La Botte, Marco Simone, Montecelio, Pichini, Setteville, Setteville Nord, Villalba, Villanova

Government
  - Mayor: Mauro Lombardo

Area
  - Total: 79.47 km^{2} (30.68 sq mi)
- Elevation: 105 m (344 ft)

Population (31 August 2021)
  - Total: 86,814
  - Density: 1,092/km^{2} (2,829/sq mi)
- Demonym: Guidoniani
- Time zone: UTC+1 (CET)
  - Summer (DST): UTC+2 (CEST)
- Postal code: 00010, 00011, 00012, 00014
- Dialing code: 0774
- Patron saint: Maria Beata Vergine di Loreto
- Saint day: 10 December
- Website: Official website

Guidonia Montecelio (Italian pronunciation: [ɡwiˈdɔːnja ˌmonteˈtʃɛːljo]), commonly known as Guidonia, is a town and comune in the Metropolitan City of Rome Capital, Lazio, central Italy.

== Geography ==
The municipality of Guidonia Montecelio, formed by the main towns of Guidonia and Montecelio, lies to the north-east of Rome, some kilometres from the Grande Raccordo Anulare - a ring-shaped motorway which forms a circle around the capital. The terrain of Guidonia Montecelio is mainly flat, and the community lies in between the Via Nomentana and the Via Tiburtina.

It borders with Fonte Nuova, Marcellina, Palombara Sabina, Rome, San Polo dei Cavalieri, Sant'Angelo Romano and Tivoli. The hamlets (frazioni) are Albuccione, Bivio di Guidonia, Colle Fiorito, Colleverde, La Botte, Marco Simone, Montecelio, Pichini, Setteville, Setteville Nord, Villalba and Villanova.

== History ==
Montecelio was founded in 998 as a fortified castrum (Castrum Monticellorum).

In 1915 the Regio Esercito (Italian Royal Army) built a major military airport in the area for its Corpo Aeronautico Militare (Military Aviation Corps), the predecessor of the Italian Royal Air Force founded in 1923.

Guidonia was erected as a comune in 1937 by Benito Mussolini, its name chosen to honour the Regia Aeronautica general Alessandro Guidoni (1880–1928), who had died on 27 April 1928 while testing a new parachute at the air force facilities.

== Demographics ==
Historical population

Year	Pop.	±%
1861	-	—
1871	2,799	—
1881	3,208	+14.6%
1901	4,094	+27.6%
1911	4,440	+8.5%
1921	4,943	+11.3%
1931	5,696	+15.2%
1936	6,597	+15.8%

Year	Pop.	±%
1951	12,811	+94.2%
1961	22,205	+73.3%
1971	32,399	+45.9%
1981	49,328	+52.3%
1991	55,544	+12.6%
2001	67,516	+21.6%
2011	81,447	+20.6%
2021	88,642	+8.8%

Source: ISTAT

== Economy ==
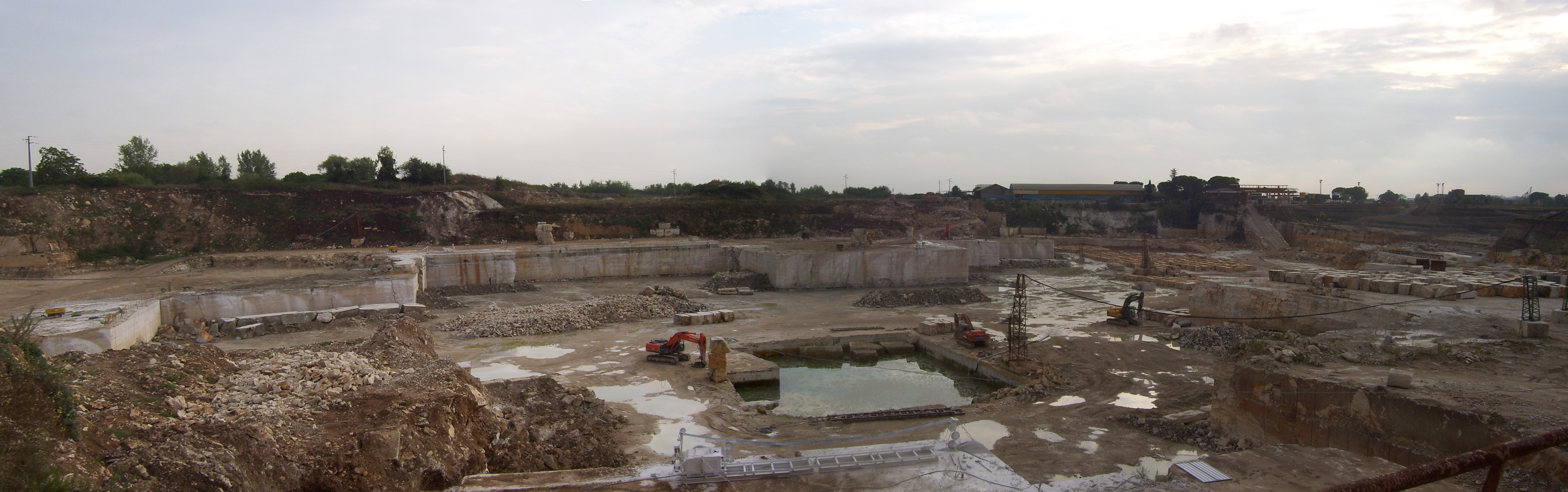
Travertine quarries in Guidonia.

Today the town is part of the Rome metropolitan area, with a massive presence of industry (mainly travertine caves and cement industry) and the service sector. The number of residents commuting to Rome is high, with transport in a critical situation.

Guidonia is also home to Marco Simone Golf and Country Club, which was announced as the host of the 2022 Ryder Cup in June 2015, but with the COVID-19 pandemic postponing the 2020 Ryder Cup to 2021, subsequent matches were pushed back a year with Marco Simone then hosted the event in 2023.

== Climate ==
Climate data for Guidonia (Guidonia Air Base), 1991–2020
Month	Jan	Feb	Mar	Apr	May	Jun	Jul	Aug	Sep	Oct	Nov	Dec	Year
Mean daily maximum °C (°F)	13.2 (55.8)	14.3 (57.7)	17.3 (63.1)	20.5 (68.9)	25.0 (77.0)	29.8 (85.6)	33.1 (91.6)	33.5 (92.3)	28.1 (82.6)	23.3 (73.9)	17.9 (64.2)	14.0 (57.2)	22.5 (72.5)
Daily mean °C (°F)	7.8 (46.0)	8.5 (47.3)	11.2 (52.2)	14.1 (57.4)	18.4 (65.1)	22.7 (72.9)	25.5 (77.9)	26.0 (78.8)	21.5 (70.7)	17.3 (63.1)	12.6 (54.7)	8.8 (47.8)	16.2 (61.2)
Mean daily minimum °C (°F)	2.4 (36.3)	2.6 (36.7)	5.1 (41.2)	7.7 (45.9)	11.8 (53.2)	15.6 (60.1)	18.0 (64.4)	18.4 (65.1)	14.9 (58.8)	11.3 (52.3)	7.4 (45.3)	3.5 (38.3)	9.9 (49.8)
Average precipitation mm (inches)	64.1 (2.52)	107.3 (4.22)	70.6 (2.78)	83.7 (3.30)	82.8 (3.26)	53.1 (2.09)	39.2 (1.54)	33.2 (1.31)	119.6 (4.71)	129.2 (5.09)	127.4 (5.02)	94.6 (3.72)	1,004.9 (39.56)
Average precipitation days (≥ 1 mm)	7.4	7.8	7.3	8.3	7.9	4.8	3.2	3.1	6.6	7.5	10.2	8.8	82.9
Average relative humidity (%)	73.7	70.2	69.0	69.3	68.0	65.6	63.3	63.9	67.6	71.9	75.4	74.6	69.4
Source: NOAA

== People ==
- David Di Michele - Football player

== International relations ==
Guidonia Montecelio is twinned with:

- Kawasaki, Japan
- Cape Canaveral, United States.
- Kashira, Russia
