= San Polo dei Cavalieri =

- Comune
- Comune di San Polo dei Cavalieri
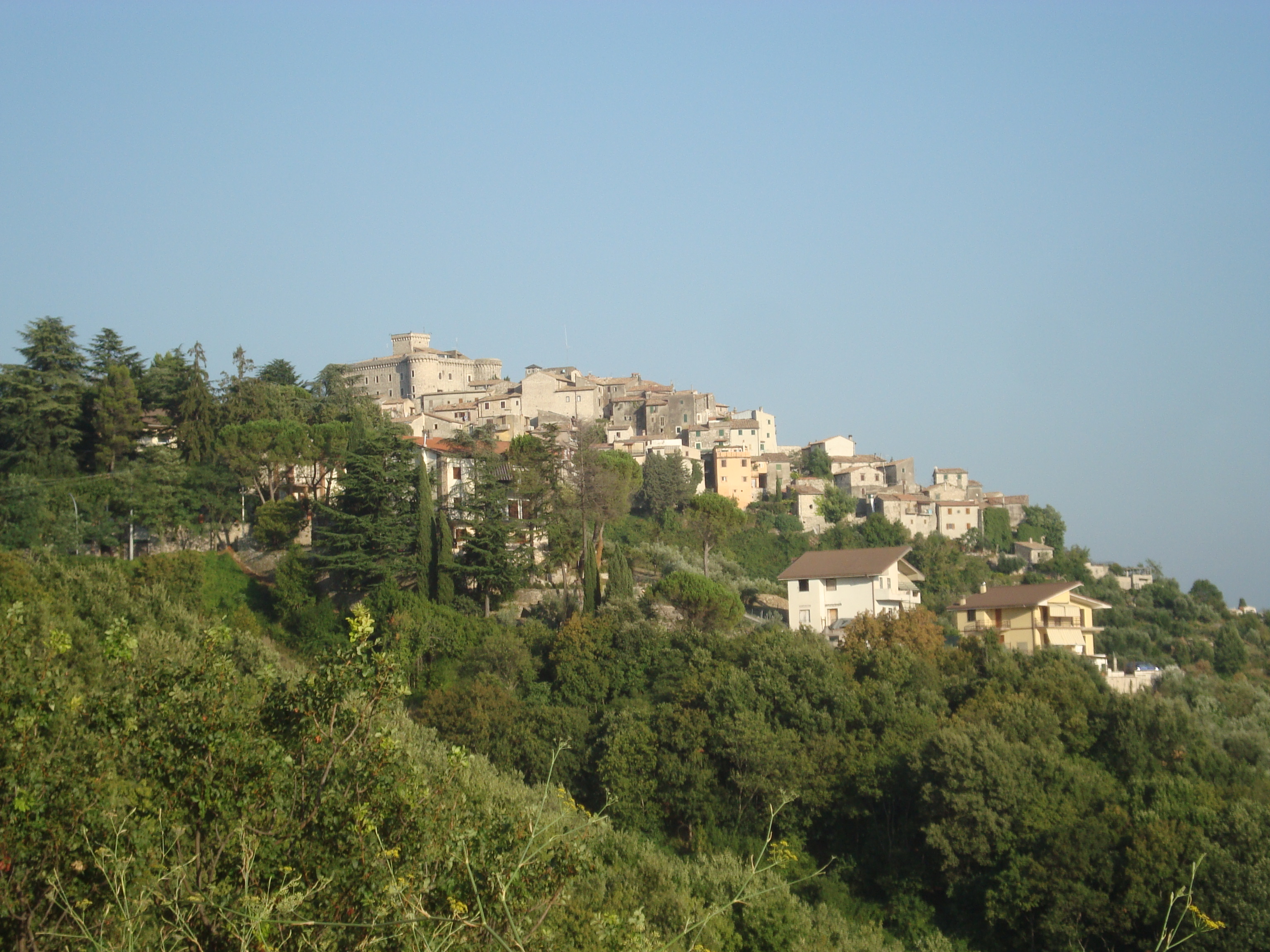
- View of San Polo dei Cavalieri

- Location within Italy Location within Lazio
- Coordinates: 42°1′N 12°50′E
- Country: Italy
- Region: Lazio
- Metropolitan city: Rome (RM)

Government
  - Mayor: Simone Trusiani

Area
  - Total: 42.53 km^{2} (16.42 sq mi)
- Elevation: 651 m (2,136 ft)

Population (30 November 2016)
  - Total: 2,985
  - Density: 70.19/km^{2} (181.8/sq mi)
- Time zone: UTC+1 (CET)
  - Summer (DST): UTC+2 (CEST)
- Postal code: 00010
- Dialing code: 0774
- Website: Official website

San Polo dei Cavalieri is a comune (municipality) in the Metropolitan City of Rome in the Italian region of Lazio, located about 30 kilometres (19 mi) northeast of Rome.

San Polo dei Cavalieri borders the following municipalities: Guidonia Montecelio, Licenza, Marcellina, Monteflavio, Palombara Sabina, Roccagiovine, Tivoli, Vicovaro.
