= Colle Monfortani =

Frazione of Rome, Italy

- Frazione
- Location of Colle Monfortani in Italy
- Coordinates: 41.891667°N 12.646667°E
- Country: Italy
- Region: Lazio
- Metropolitan city: Rome
- Comune: Roma Capitale

Population
  - Total: 524 residencies
- Time zone: UTC+1 (CET)
  - Summer (DST): UTC+2 (CEST)
- Postal code: 00132
- Dialing code: 06

Colle Monfortani is a frazione of Rome, situated in zone Z. XIII Torre Angela, in the territory of Municipio Roma VI (formerly Municipio Roma VIII).

It arises on the southern side of Prenestina road, between the frazioni of Prato Fiorito on the east and Colle Prenestino on the west and, together with the latter, forms part of the zone "O" 15+16 Colle Mentuccia.

== Etymology ==
The name derives from the principle part of the religious cult, dedicated to San Luigi of Montfort, founded by the Friends of Mary in Monfortani.

== Religious architecture ==
- Church of San Luigi of Montfort, on Prenestina road. A church of the 20th century. 41.892299°N 12.649799°E

The Church is annexed to the parish of San Massimiliano Kolbe.

== Odonymy ==
Except for the Pecoreccia di Torre Angela road, Cannaroli road and Romolo Vaselli road (the family of which were proprietors of the territory where the frazione was brought into being), Colle Monfortani road, like that of the neighbouring Colle Prenestino, all the roads are dedicated to the municipalities of Campania.
