= Hanne Haller =

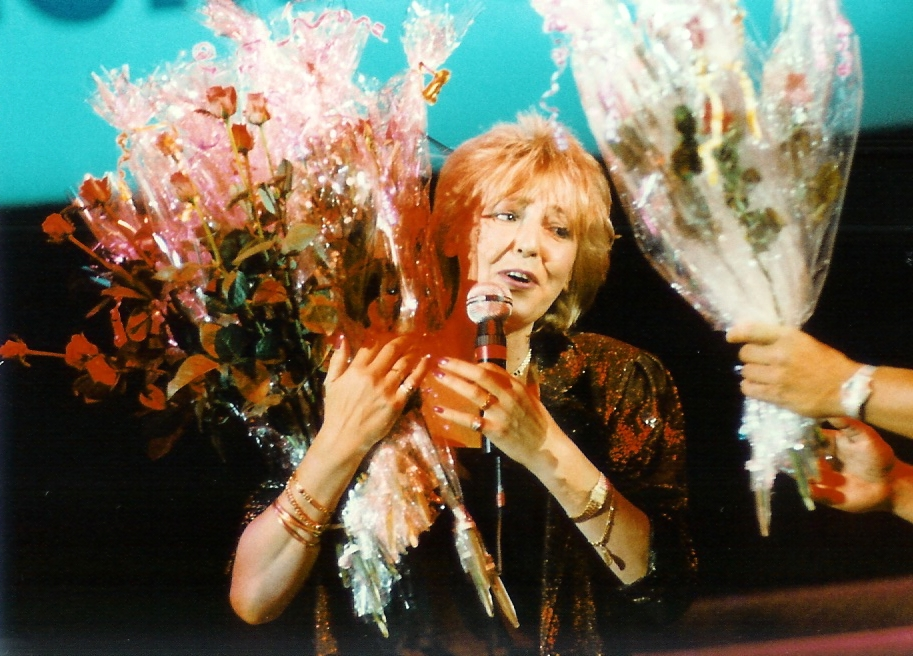

Background information
- Born: Hannelore Haller; January 14, 1950; Rendsburg, West Germany
- Died: November 15, 2005 (aged 55) Tegernsee, Germany
- Website: hannehaller.de

Hanne Haller (January 14, 1950 in Rendsburg, Germany - November 15, 2005 in Tegernsee, Germany; full name Hannelore Haller) was a German pop singer (genre known as "schlager" in German), composer, writer, producer, and sound engineer.

Note: this entry is based on a translation of the entry in the German version of Wikipedia.

== Life ==
Hanne Haller grew up in the province of Schleswig-Holstein. Her mother was an opera singer, her father a banker. While in school she played drums for "The Rooks" in the town of Ronnenberg near Hannover. After completing school in 1968, she went on to study athletics, but had to give that up due to a serious illness. In the same year she founded a gospel choir. Later in the 60s, she performed a single consisting of two songs by Siegfried Fietz ("Wir sind nur eine Minderheit"/"We are only one minority" and "Broadway") for the Christian publishing house "Frohe Botschaft" ("Good News") in Wetzlar.

She went on to study to become a medical assistant and passed the "MTA" exam in 1970. She then worked in the X-ray and biochemistry lab of the Georg-August University/Göttingen University. In 1971 she began her musical career in earnest. She and producer Georg Moslener made the single "Spring in Vietnam" ("Frühling in Vietnam"), which did not get much of a push. Haller learned to play the piano, and in 1971 came out with her first album "Applause for Hanne Haller" ("Applaus für Hanne Haller"). However, the company went bankrupt and the album was never released.

Haller then went to Munich and learned the art of being a sound engineer. She worked in many areas of the business. By the end of the 1970s she began to compose music. She started under the pseudonym "Hansi Echer". In 1978 singer Karel Gott performed her song "Where the Wind Blows the Leaves" ("Wohin der Wind die Blätter weht"). Before that she had already composed the song "60 Years and Not a Bit More" ("60 Jahre und kein bisschen weise") for the actor/singer Curd Jürgens to along with his biography. After a few more singles, in 1979 she had the chance to sing before a wider audience. She took the song "Goodbye, Chérie" to the German qualification of the Eurovision Song Contest and managed a seventh-place finish. After that she made more recordings, mostly with Bernd Meinunger writing the lyrics. Their song "Samstag Abend" made it to number 11 on the German musical charts. In 1982 she and Meinunger founded their own musical publishing house. Haller produced songs in her own recording studio. That year, she won her first of many "Golden Tuning Forks" ("Goldene Stimmgabel", the German version of the Grammy awards).

In 1985, Haller founded the band Wind. She didn't perform for the group herself, but she composed what has become the group's signature song, "For All" ("Für alle"). The same year, the song earned Wind a second-place finish in the Eurovision Song Contest. After this success, she wrote songs for Daliah Lavi, Elke Martens, Katja Ebstein, Rex Gildo, Lena Valaitis, Caterina Valente, Jürgen Drews, Ingrid Peters, Wolfgang Fierek, and Milva. She also discovered Rosanna Rocci.

She continued to write, produce and perform throughout the 80s and 90s despite battling breast cancer since the mid-90s. She died on November 15, 2005. After her death, her record company announced that a previously-planned album of religious music ("Wir sind nur Gast auf dieser Welt"/"We Are Only Guests of This World") would be released.

In 2008, it surfaced that she had been in a relationship with radio and TV hostess Ramona Leiss for four years beginning in the late 1980s.

== Awards ==
- German Record Prize, 1983
- Golden Tuning Fork ("Goldene Stimmgabel") 1989, 1992 und 1997
- Golden Note ("Goldene Note"), 1990
- Golden Record ("Goldene Schallplatte") for "My Dear Husband" ("Mein lieber Mann"), 1990

== Best-known works ==
- Deckel auf Deckel zu (Cover open, cover shut) 1979
- Goodbye, Chérie 1979
- Ich warte hier unten (I'll wait down here) 1980
- Samstagabend (Saturday night)1980
- Geh nicht (Don't Go) 1981
- Weil du ein zärtlicher Mann bist (Because you're an endearing man) 1981
- Engel fallen nicht vom Himmel (Angels don't fall from the sky) 1983
- Der Sandmann (The Sandman)1985
- Zeit für ein bisschen Zärtlichkeit (Time for a little tenderness) 1985
- Ich hab' Dich unheimlich lieb (I love you unearthly) 1985
- Starke Frauen weinen heimlich (Strong women cry secretly) 1986
- Eine Wahnsinns Love Story (A hell of a Love Story) 1987
- Hallo, lieber Gott (Hello, Good God) 1987
- Mein lieber Mann (My dear husband) 1989
- Bratkartoffeln mit Spiegelei (Fried potatoes with fried egg) 1990
- Willkommen im Leben (Welcome to life) 1991
- Schatz, ich will ja nicht meckern (Honey, I don't want to gripe)1992
- Vater unser (Our Father) 2003
- Und hättest du die Liebe nicht (And if you didn't have love) (2004)

== Discography ==
- 1976 Komm, lass uns miteinander reden (Come on, let's talk)
- 1980 Na und (So what)
- 1981 Stärker als ich (Stronger than me)
- 1982 Augenblicke (Moments)
- 1984 Eines Tages (One fine day)
- 1985 Gefühlsroulette (Roulette of feelings)
- 1986 Ganz normale Frau'n (Just ordinary women)
- 1987 Love Story (Best Of)
- 1988 Liebe u.s.w. (Love etc.)
- 1989 Mein lieber Mann (My dear darling)
- 1990 Bratkartoffeln mit Spiegelei (Fried potatoes with fried egg)
- 1991 Willkommen im Leben (Welcome to life)
- 1992 Überall ist Bethlehem (Weihnachtsalbum) (Everywhere is Bethlehem (Christmas album))
- 1993 Immer mittendrin (Always right in the middle)
- 1994 Liebe hin - Liebe her (Love to - Love fro)
- 1996 Verdammt ehrlich (Damn honest)
- 1998 Für alle Träumer (For all dreamers)
- 1999 Ungeschminkt (Unadorned)
- 2001 Hellwach (Wide awake)
- 2003 Mitten im Licht (In the middle of the light)
- 2004 Gute Nachricht (Good news)
- 2006 Wir sind nur Gast auf dieser Welt (Best Of) (We're just guests in this world)
- 2007 So long and goodbye (Live-Album)
- 2008 Die unvollendeten Lieder (The unfinished songs)

The debut album "Komm, lass uns miteinander reden" was originally published as "Applaus für Hanne Haller." This discography only contains her studio albums and official "Best of" compilations. Other compilations and re-releases exist from other companies.
