= Giovanni Rinaldi Montorio =

16th-century Roman Catholic bishop

Most Reverend Giovanni Rinaldi Montorio
- Bishop of Narni
- Church: Catholic Church
- Diocese: Diocese of Narni
- In office: 1538–1546
- Predecessor: Guido Ascanio Sforza di Santa Fiora
- Successor: Pierdonato Cesi (seniore)

Orders
- Consecration: 21 March 1539 by Gian Pietro Carafa

Personal details
- Died: 1546

Giovanni Rinaldi Montorio (died 1546) was a Roman Catholic prelate who served as Bishop of Narni (1538–1546).

== Biography ==
On 11 January 1538, Giovanni Rinaldi Montorio was appointed during the papacy of Pope Paul III as Bishop of Narni. On 21 March 1539, he was consecrated bishop in the Sistine Chapel by Gian Pietro Carafa, Archbishop of Chieti, with Bartolomeo Siringi, Bishop of Castellaneta, and Alfonso Oliva, Bishop of Bovino, serving as co-consecrators. He served as Bishop of Narni until his death in 1546.

== External links and additional sources ==
- Cheney, David M. "Diocese of Narni". Catholic-Hierarchy.org. (Chronology of Bishops) ^{[self-published]}
- Chow, Gabriel. "Diocese of Narni (Italy)". GCatholic.org. Archived from the original on 4 February 2014. (Chronology of Bishops) ^{[self-published]}

Catholic Church titles
Preceded by Guido Ascanio Sforza di Santa Fiora	Bishop of Narni; 1538–1546	Succeeded by Pierdonato Cesi (seniore)
