= Rocci =

Rocci is an Italian surname. Notable people with the surname include:

- Aimie Rocci (born 1993), Australian basketballer
- Benedetto Rocci (died 1661), Italian Roman Catholic prelate who served as Bishop of Nusco
- Bernardino Rocci (1627–1680), Italian Roman Catholic cardinal
- Ciriaco Rocci (1582–1651), Italian Catholic Cardinal and papal Apostolic Nuncio to Switzerland and Holy Roman Empire
- Maddison Rocci (born 1998), Australian basketball player
- Rosanna Rocci (born 1968), Italian singer

== See also ==
- Scipione Riva-Rocci (1863–1937), Italian internist, pathologist and pediatrician
