= Gavignano =

- Comune
- Comune di Gavignano
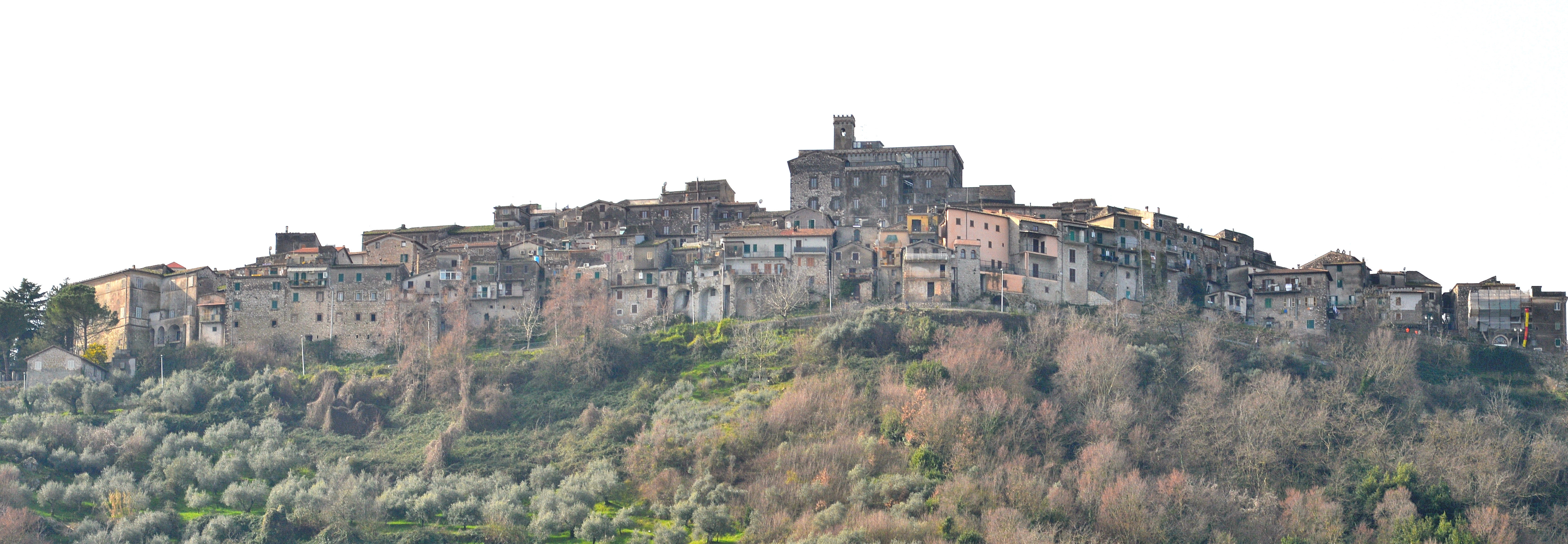
- View of Gavignano

- Coat of arms

- Location within Italy Location within Lazio
- Coordinates: 41°42′N 13°3′E
- Country: Italy
- Region: Lazio
- Metropolitan city: Rome (RM)
- Frazioni: Rossilli

Government
  - Mayor: Emiliano Datti

Area
  - Total: 15.04 km^{2} (5.81 sq mi)
- Elevation: 404 m (1,325 ft)

Population (31 August 2017)
  - Total: 1,904
  - Density: 126.6/km^{2} (327.9/sq mi)
- Demonym: Gavignanesi
- Time zone: UTC+1 (CET)
  - Summer (DST): UTC+2 (CEST)
- Postal code: 00030
- Dialing code: 06
- Patron saint: St. Roch
- Saint day: 16 August
- Website: Official website

Gavignano is a town in the Metropolitan City of Rome, Lazio, central Italy. Gavignano is approximately 50 km south east of Rome, on a hill in the Lepini Mountains.

The name of the town is believed to be derived from the Roman consul and general Aulus Gabinius, a friend of Pompey and ally of Julius Caesar.

The nearest train station is located in the town of Colleferro. Nearby, within the communal territory, is an archaeological site of a Roman villa from the Republican era, the villa "Rossilli", believed to be a country home of the Julii family. At Rossilli there is also a historical abbey, built by the Benedictines in the 12th century.

Pope Innocent III was born there in 1160.
