= Fonte Nuova =

- Comune
- Comune di Fonte Nuova
- Coat of arms

- Location within Italy Location within Lazio
- Coordinates: 42°00′06″N 12°37′19″E
- Country: Italy
- Region: Lazio
- Metropolitan city: Rome (RM)
- Frazioni: Quarto Conca, Santa Lucia, Selva dei Cavalieri, Selvotta, Tor Lupara, XII Apostoli

Government
  - Mayor: Piero Presutti

Area
  - Total: 19.94 km^{2} (7.70 sq mi)
- Elevation: 150 m (490 ft)

Population (31 August 2021)
  - Total: 34,872
  - Density: 1,749/km^{2} (4,529/sq mi)
- Demonym: Fontenuovesi
- Time zone: UTC+1 (CET)
  - Summer (DST): UTC+2 (CEST)
- Postal code: 00013
- Dialing code: 06
- Patron saint: Saint Joseph
- Saint day: March 19
- Website: Official website

Fonte Nuova is a comune (municipality) in the Metropolitan City of Rome in the Italian region Lazio, located about 15 kilometres (9 mi) northeast of Rome.

The comune was created in 2001 from the frazioni of Tor Lupara di Mentana and Santa Lucia di Mentana, once belonging to Mentana, and that of Tor Lupara of Guidonia Montecelio.
