= Rosanna Rocci =

Italian pop singer

Rosanna Rocci (born October 28, 1968, in Solothurn) is an Italian pop singer.

== Life and career ==
Rosanna Rocci first grew up in Switzerland. At the age of four, she moved with her family to Italy in Abruzzo. She spent the rest of her childhood there with two sisters. She learned to play the organetto at an early age, which was actually reserved for men in Italy.

At an event in Germany, Rocci played for the composer Hanne Haller and the lyricist Bernd Meinunger, who brought her to Germany. This is how she came to Kempten. Initially she was used to produce hits in English and Italian language. At the beginning of the 1990s, Rocci went on tour with Tony Christie and Umberto Tozzi and became internationally known. She was a guest on numerous hit parades and television shows. From 1992, she also made German recordings.

In addition to solo performances and solo recordings, Rocci has also been performing as a duo with her husband, fellow pop singer Michael Morgan, since 1999. Their first hit was Ich gehör zu Dir, with which they won the "Golden Muse" at the Deutsche Schlager-Festspiele 1999.

Rosanna Rocci is under contract with the music label zoom music. In April 2019, she released her new album 5.0 to mark her 50th birthday.

Rocci was married to Michael Morgan from 1997 and has a son with him. At the end of June 2012, she announced their official separation. In June 2020, Rocci made her divorce public.

== Discography ==
=== Albums ===
- 1992: Rosanna
- 1994: Kopfüber ins Leben
- 1996: My Fire is Burning
- 1998: Amore, Amore
- 1999: Emozioni
- 2001: I Live for You (with Michael Morgan)
- 2001: Heart Over Head in Love
- 2001: Rosanna
- 2001: Un Poco di Amore
- 2002: Dolce Vita
- 2002: Kopfüber ins Leben
- 2003: Aber bitte mit Herz
- 2003: Ti Amo Ancora
- 2004: Felicita – Liebe hautnah (with Michael Morgan)
- 2005: Das fühlt sich gut an
- 2007: Die grössten Single-Hits
- 2007: 100% Rosanna
- 2009: Solo con te – Nur mit Dir
- 2012: Glücksgefühle
- 2019: 5.0

=== Singles ===
- La mia Musica
- 1990: Mister, Mister
- 1991: Theresa
- 1991: My family
- 1992: Chaka Chaka
- 1993: Wer die Augen geschlossen (wird nie die Wahrheit seh'n) (as part of Mut zur Menschlichkeit)
- 1994: Vino e Pane
- 1995: Perche no – warum nicht
- 1996: Mamma Mia
- 1996: Ciao mio amore (with Andreas Fulterer)
- 1997: Ritornerai
- 1999: Ich gehör zu Dir (with Michael Morgan)
- 2001: Un Poco di Amore
- 2002: Un Anno d'Amore
- 2005: Arrivederci Hans
- 2007: E Pericoloso
- 2007: Ich bin aus dem Süden
- 2011: Du bist kein Americano
- 2012: Olé Olá – heisser als Fieber
- 2015: Lo Vorrei
- 2019: Tutto o niente (Gefährliches Spiel)
- 2019: Solo Amore (Tropical Mix)
- 2019: Solo Con Te
- 2024: Dieser Richard Gere Moment
