= Pier Donato Cesi (cardinal, born 1522) =

Italian Catholic Cardinal

Pier Donato Cesi (1522–1586) was an Italian Catholic Cardinal from the noble Cesi family. He is sometimes referred to as Pier Donato Cesi, seniore (senior) to differentiate between him and his relative Pier Donato Cesi iuniore (1583–1656). He was the brother of Angelo Cesi (bishop of Todi) (1566–1606); Romolo Cesi, Bishop of Narni (1566–1578); Lodovico Cesi, Abbot of Chiaravalle; and Pietro, Marchese of Oliveto.

== Prelate ==
Cesi studied law at Perugia, Bologna, and Pavia, and earned the degree of Doctor in utroque iure (JUD) at Ferrara in 1544. He then established himself at Rome, in the household of his cousin, Cardinal Federico Cesi.

He was named bishop of Narni by Pope Paul III on 25 June 1546. In 1547 he attended the Council of Trent. During his term as bishop, he was governor of the Romagna from 1556 to 1559. While bishop, he was a principal co-consecrator of Filippo Maria Campeggi, Coadjutor Bishop of Feltre (1559); and Giulio Sauli, Bishop of Brugnato (1566).

On 11 April 1560, Cesi wa named governor of Bologna, and Vice-Legate to Cardinal Carlo Borromeo, the nephew of Pope Pius IV. He served until 30 December 1563. He was reappointed governor on 22 January 1564, and served until 5 January 1565. He then became governor of Civitavecchia in 1563.

He bought in 1565 together with his brother, the bishop of Todi, the Palazzo Armellini in Borgo, and took charge of the restructuring, relying for the new project to Martino Longhi the Elder, who between 1570 and 1588 oversaw the renovation in its present form. Being like his brother an art lover, he hosted in his palace a large antiques collection and a large library.

== Cardinal ==
On 17 May 1570, Pierdonato was elevated to the Cardinalate by Pope Pius V, and installed as Cardinal-Priest of Santa Barbara, which had been vacant for 17 years, on 9 June 1570. He then opted for the Titular church of San Vitale, made vacant by the move of Cardinal Gaspare Cervantes to S. Martino al Monte on 16 June 1570; and finally Sant'Anastasia al Palatino, on 28 May 1584, made vacant by the move of Cardinal Giovanni Francesco Commendone to S. Marco.

Cardinal Cesi was appointed a cleric of the Apostolic Camera (Papal Treasury) by Pope Pius V.

He attended the papal Conclave of 1572, where he supported Cardinal Alessandro Farnese until he was vetoed by the king of Spain.

Pope Gregory XIII appointed Cesi his Legate in Bologna.

At the Papal conclave of April 1585, Cesi was one of thirteen cardinals actively canvassing for votes for the papacy. Cesi was supported by Francesco I de' Medici, the Grand Duke of Tuscany, but was opposed by Cardinal Filippo Boncompagni, the Major Penitentiary and Archpriest of S. Maria Maggiore, the nephew of Pope Gregory XIII. In a dispatch of April 20, the day of the opening of the Conclave, the Florentine Ambassador Vinta wrote to the Grand Duke: "At this point, several are leaning towards Savelli, the people towards Sirleto and Montalto [Peretti], the gluttons for Cesi, the eager [volentirosi] for Farnese, the women for Santa Croce, the Jews for Como, the greedy for San Giorgio, the courtesans for Albano, the Bolognese for Palotto." In the end, there was no balloting. Cardinal Felice Peretti Montalto was elected by "adoration".

Pierdonato Cesi died in Rome on 29 September 1586, at the age of 64, and was buried in S. Maria in Vallicella by his uncle, Cardinal Federico Cesi.

== Sources ==
- Cardella, Lorenzo. Memorie storiche de cardinali della Santa romana chiesa. (in Italian). Vol. 5 (Roma: Pagliarini 1792), pp. 131-133.
- Eubel, Conradus, ed. (1923). Hierarchia catholica (in Latin). Vol. 3 (Tomus 3) (second ed.). Münster: Libreria Regensbergiana. p. 253.. Archived.
- Gigli, Laura (1992). Guide rionali di Roma (in Italian). Vol. Borgo (III). Fratelli Palombi Editori, Roma. ISSN 0393-2710.
- Martinori, E. Genealogiae cronistoria di una grande famiglia umbro-romana: i Cesi. (in Italian). Roma 1931.
- Parker, M. (1963). Palazzo Cesi. A Late Renaissance Palace in Rome. Cambridge: CUP 1963.
- Salimei, A. (1934). "Per la storia delle famiglie romane: i Cesi." (in Italian). In: Roma. Vol. XII (1934), pp. 404-414.
- Valone, Carolyn (2025). "Family Strategies: Cesi Men and Women in Early Modern Rome," in: E.A. Lisot-Nelson (ed.), Family Matters: Spiritual and Maternal Connections in European Art and Connections (Toronto: Victoria University 2025), pp. 19-30.

Catholic Church titles
Preceded by Giovanni Rinaldi Montorio	Bishop of Narni; 1546–1566	Succeeded by Romolo Cesi
Preceded by Giovanni Andrea Mercurio	Cardinal-Priest of Santa Barbara; 1570	Succeeded by Gaspar de Zúñiga y Avellaneda
Preceded by Gaspar Cervantes de Gaete	Cardinal-Priest of San Vitale; 1570–1584	Succeeded by Costanzo de Sarnano
Preceded by Gianfrancesco Commendone	Cardinal-Priest of Sant'Anastasia; 1584–1586	Succeeded by Ludovico Madruzzo
