= Marina of Rome =

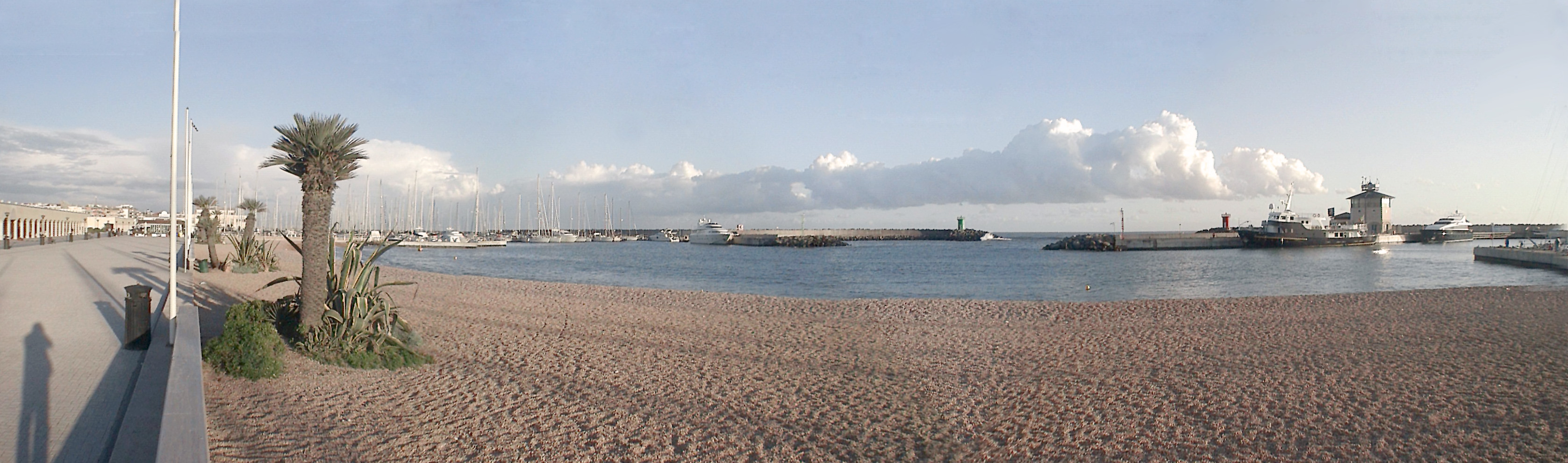
- Interactive map of Marina of Rome
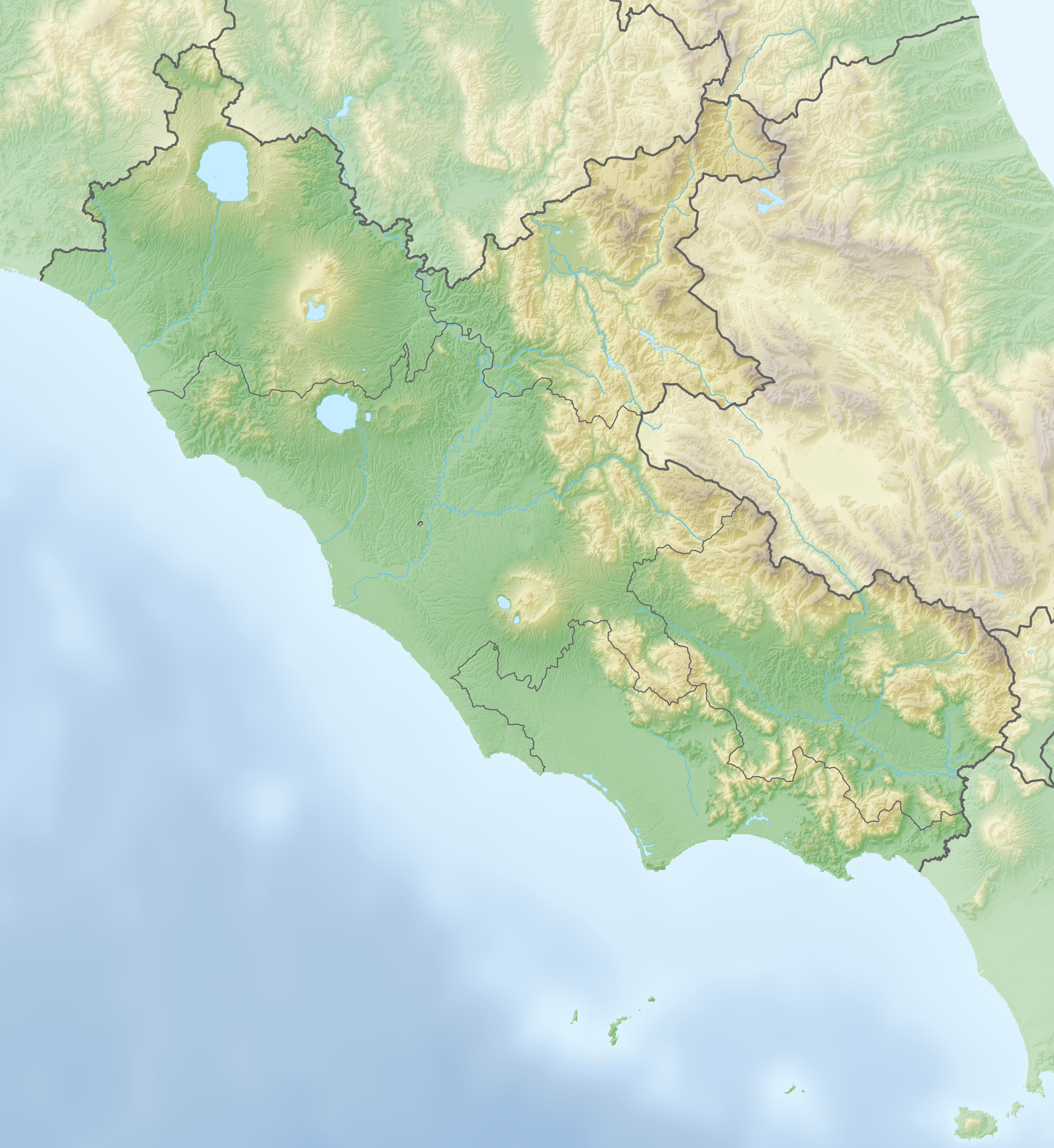
- Location within Lazio
- Native name: Porto Turistico di Roma

Location
- Country: Italy
- Location: Lungomare Duca degli Abruzzi, Ostia (Rome)
- Coordinates: 41°44′17″N 12°15′00″E

Details
- Operated by: Porto Turistico di Roma s.r.l.
- Type of Harbor: Tourist port
- No. of berths: 833

Statistics
- Website www.portoturisticodiroma.it

The Marina of Rome (Italian: Porto Turistico di Roma) is a tourist port that rises along the banks of Ostia, in the Municipality of Rome (Italy).

== History ==
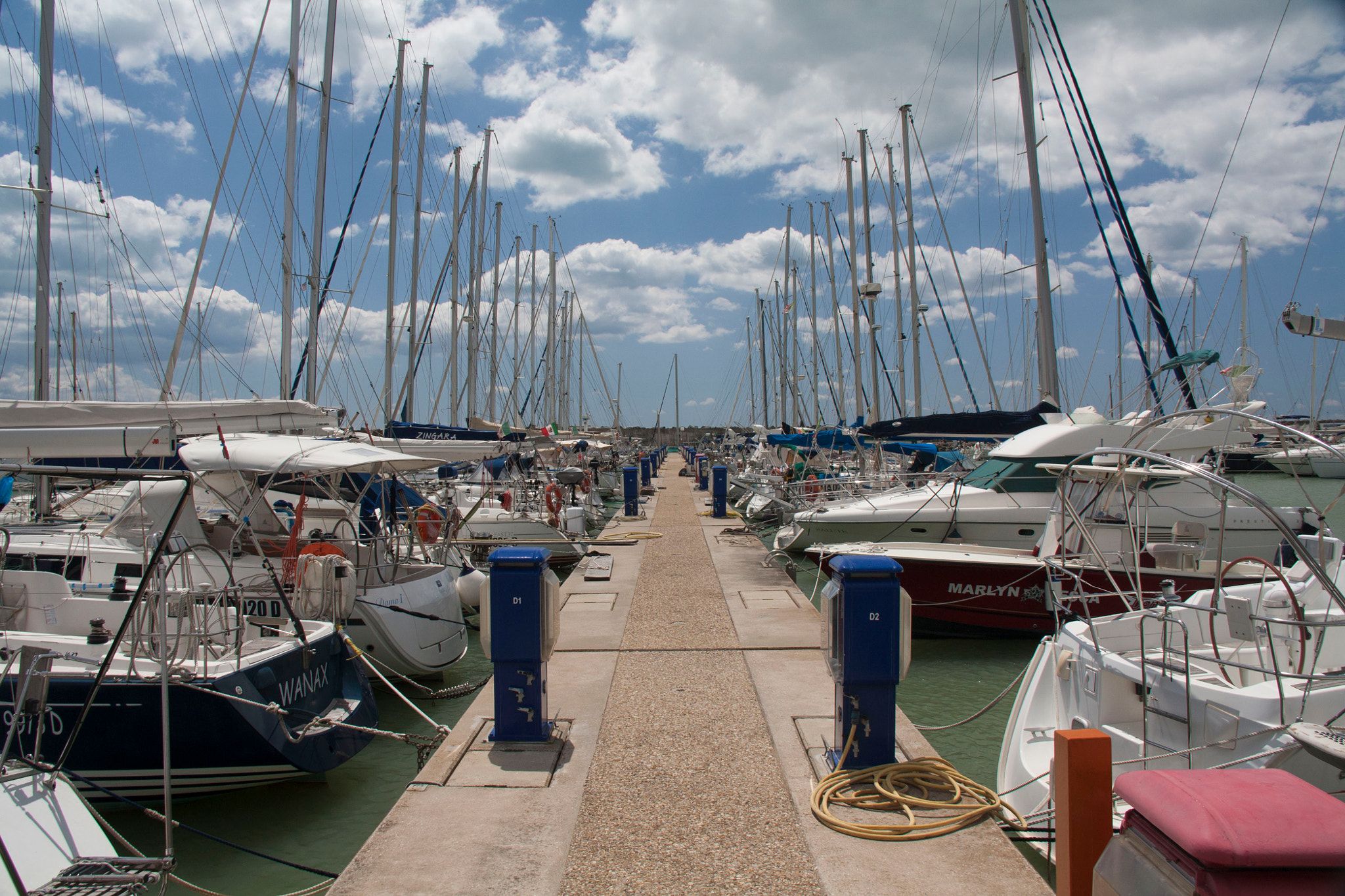
A pier in the port

The port, designed in the 1990s, it is part of a redevelopment project of the area of the Ostia Seaplane Base; in fact, the Centro Habitat Mediterraneo, an oasis of 20 hectares (49 acres) managed by LIPU (Italian Bird Protection League) extends not far from one of the entrances of the port.

The construction was entrusted to ATI (Attività Turistiche e Imprenditoriali), which inaugurated the Marina in 32 months, with an investment of 120 billion lire, in June 2001. The development of the Marina of Rome was part of a broader urban and coastal regeneration strategy aimed at enhancing the tourism infrastructure of the Ostia area and improving access to the waterfront. The project contributed to repositioning Ostia as a recreational and nautical destination, integrating leisure facilities with environmental and cultural initiatives in the surrounding area.

In 2015 Mauro Balini, the administrator of the port, was arrested on charges of bankruptcy (regarding the stimulated bankruptcy of ATI), issue of false invoices, money laundering and corruption; the port is therefore administered by the Italian judiciary.

== Facilities of the marina ==
- 833 berths with the possibility of hosting mega-yachts up to 55 meters long
- 80 shops for commercial and catering activities, apartments and offices;
- about 1,200 metres (3,900 ft) of promenade (including a cycle path) with an outlet on the Ostia seafront
- more than 10,000 square metres (110,000 ft^{2}) of exhibition areas
- an outdoor amphitheater with 750 seats
- 2,300 parking spaces on internal and external parking lots
- a shipyard equipped with a 400-ton travel lift
- offices and headquarters of the law enforcement (Guardia di Finanza, Carabinieri, Polizia di Stato and Harbour Office) and a post office

== Access ==
- From Lungomare Duca degli Abruzzi and Via dell'Idroscalo.

The Port of Rome is located immediately south of the mouth of the Tiber River, just 10 minutes by car from Fiumicino international airport and the archaeological park of Ostia Antica. It can be reached by public transport with the Rome-Lido "Metromare" railway.
