= Pier Donato Cesi (cardinal, born 1583) =

Italian Catholic Cardinal

Pier Donato Cesi, iuniore (1583 – 30 January 1656) was an Italian Catholic Cardinal. He is sometimes referred to as Pier Donato Cesi, iuniore (junior) to differentiate between him and his predecessor Pier Donato Cesi seniore (1522–1586).

Cesi was born in 1583 in Rome; the son of Federico Cesi, Count of Oliveto from the noble Cesi family and Pulcheria Orsini. He was educated by the Fathers of the Oratory of Saint Philip Neri and obtained a doctorate of law. He was made responsible for three wealthy abbeys and was made a referendary of the Tribunals of the Apostolic Signatura of Justice and of Grace. In 1615, he was made a protonotary apostolic and a cleric of the Apostolic Chamber by 1625. He was made Governor of Civitavecchia from 1627 to 1630 and Treasurer-general to Pope Urban VIII in 1634.

In 1641, Pope Urban elevated Cesi to Cardinal and made him Cardinal-Priest of San Marcello al Corso the following year. The Pope then appointed him Legate to Perugia in 1643 and granted him a dispensation to accept an appointment as canon of the cathedral chapter of Toledo; a role that had been created by the King of Spain. When Urban died, Cesi participated in the Papal conclave of 1644, which elected Pope Innocent X.

In 1645, Cesi was appointed Crown Cardinal of Sicily and held the position until 1656.

Between 1651 and 1652, he was appointed Camerlengo of the Sacred College of Cardinals and he participated in the conclave of 1655, which elected Pope Alexander VII.

Cesi died the following year, on 30 January 1656 in his Roman palace and was buried in the church of Santa Prassede, Rome.

Catholic Church titles
Preceded by Francesco Cennini de' Salamandri	Cardinal-Priest of San Marcello; 1642–1656	Succeeded by Camillo Melzi
