= Sant'Angelo Romano =

- Comune
- Comune di Sant'Angelo Romano
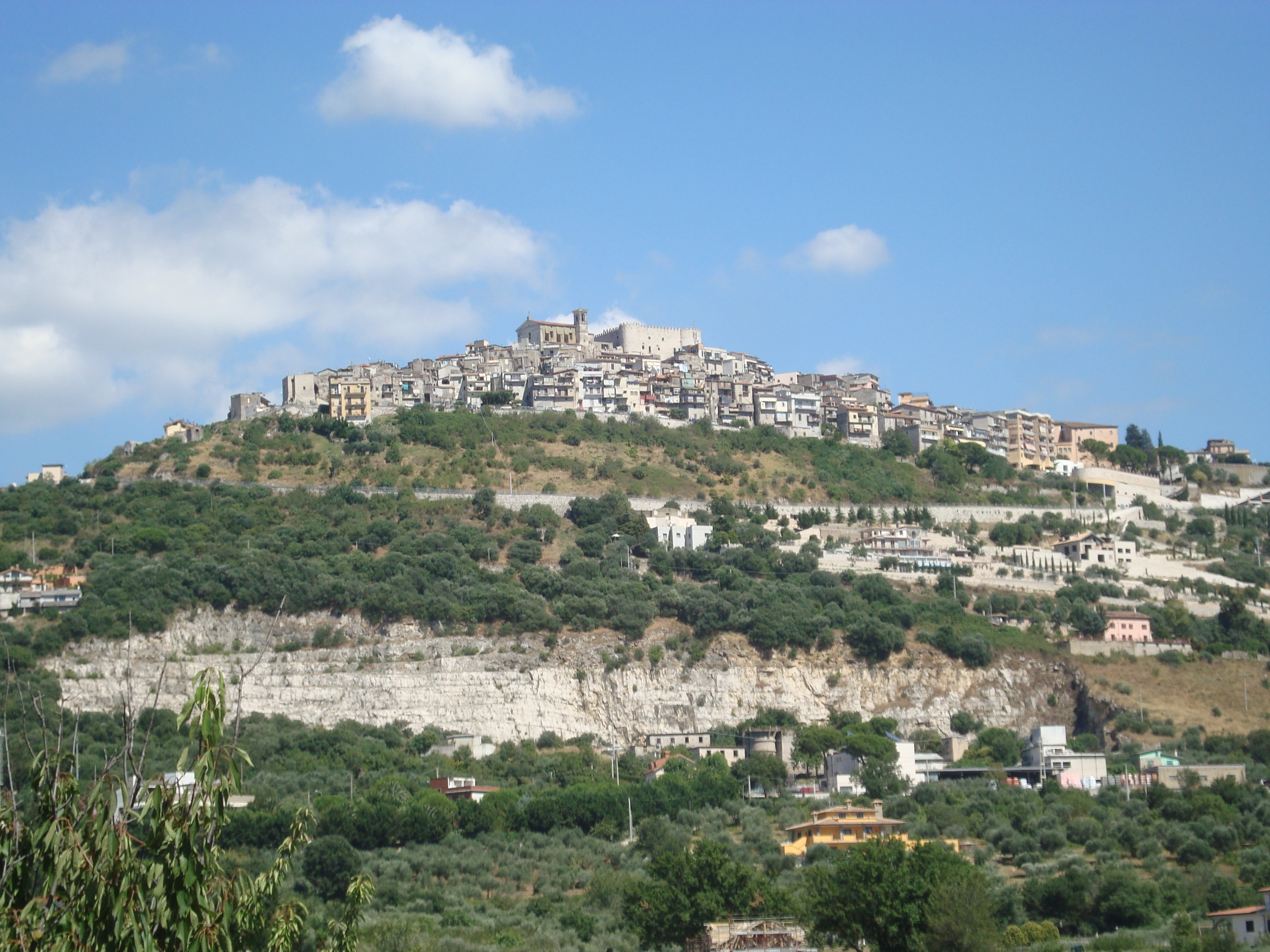
- View of Sant'Angelo Romano

- Location within Italy Location within Lazio
- Coordinates: 42°2′N 12°43′E
- Country: Italy
- Region: Lazio
- Metropolitan city: Rome (RM)

Government
  - Mayor: Martina Dominici

Area
  - Total: 21 km^{2} (8.1 sq mi)
- Elevation: 400 m (1,300 ft)

Population (31 December 2014)
  - Total: 5,016
  - Density: 240/km^{2} (620/sq mi)
- Demonym: Santangelesi
- Time zone: UTC+1 (CET)
  - Summer (DST): UTC+2 (CEST)
- Postal code: 00010
- Dialing code: 0774
- Patron saint: St. Michael Archangel, St. Liberata
- Website: Official website

Sant'Angelo Romano is a town and comune in Latium, Italy, administratively part of the Metropolitan City of Rome. It is located north of Guidonia Montecelio, where the closest Trenitalia train station (about 40 minutes by train from Rome) is located.

== Main sights ==
Sights in Sant'Angelo Romano include the Orsini-Cesi castle, which lies on the top of the old town. The castle hosts a prehistorical museum. The main body of the castle is the palace of prince Federico Cesi, the founder of Accademia dei Lincei.
