= Marcellina (municipality) =

- Comune
- Comune di Marcellina
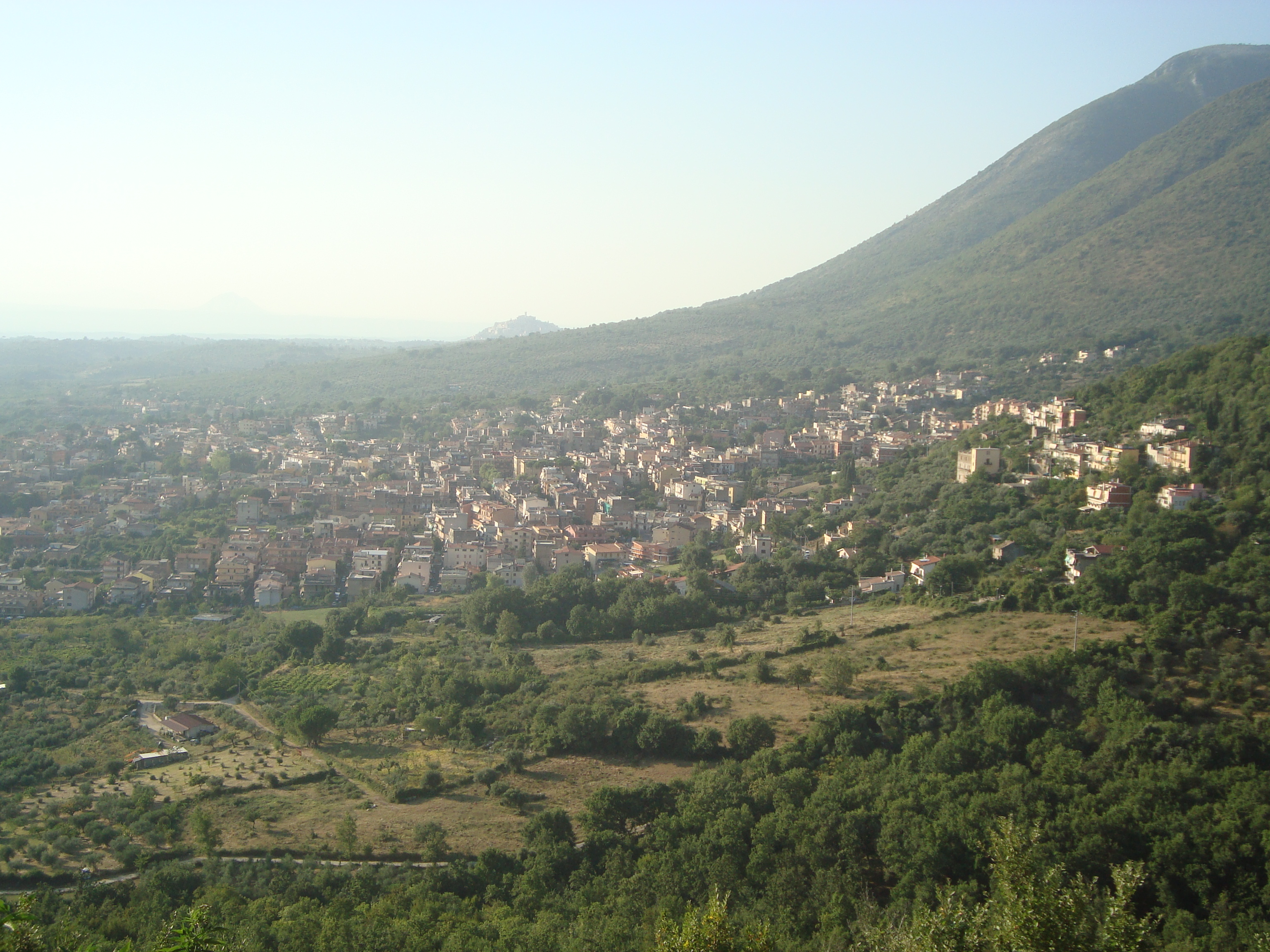
- View of Marcellina

- Location within Italy Location within Lazio
- Coordinates: 42°1′N 12°48′E
- Country: Italy
- Region: Lazio
- Metropolitan city: Rome (RM)

Government
  - Mayor: Alessandro Lundini

Area
  - Total: 15.3 km^{2} (5.9 sq mi)
- Elevation: 285 m (935 ft)

Population (30 September 2017)
  - Total: 7,322
  - Density: 479/km^{2} (1,240/sq mi)
- Demonym: Marcellinesi
- Time zone: UTC+1 (CET)
  - Summer (DST): UTC+2 (CEST)
- Postal code: 00010
- Dialing code: 0774
- Website: Official website

Marcellina (Romanesco: Marcillinu) is a comune (municipality) in the Metropolitan City of Rome in the Italian region of Latium, located about 30 kilometres (19 mi) northeast of Rome.

== Origins of the name ==
According to an uncorroborated hypothesis, the town takes the name of the Roman gens of the Claudii Marcelli, owners of lands in Marcellina during the Middle Ages. More substantial is the derivation from the surname of the feudal family of Marcellina, the Marcellini, or de Marcellinis.
