= Metropolitan City of Rome Capital =

Metropolitan City of Rome Capital Città metropolitana di Roma Capitale (Italian)
- Metropolitan city
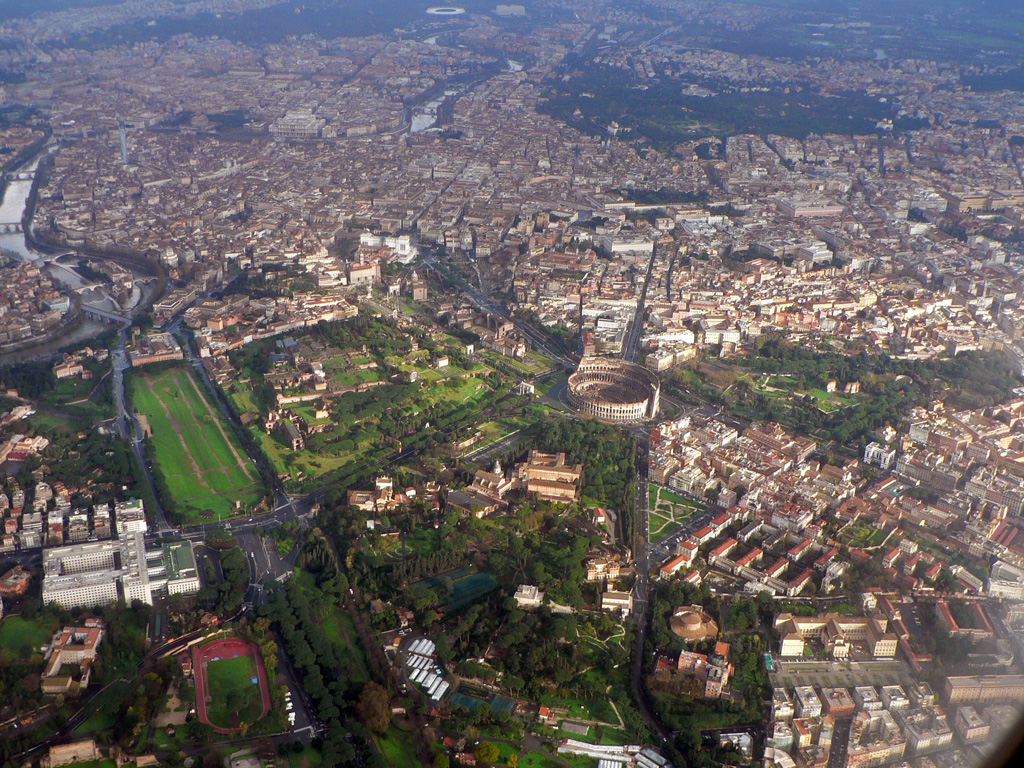
- Aerial view of Rome

- Flag Coat of arms

- Location of the Metropolitan City of Rome Capital in Italy
- Coordinates: 41°53′35″N 12°28′58″E
- Country: Italy
- Region: Lazio
- Established: 1 January 2015
- Capital(s): Rome
- Municipalities: 121

Government
  - Metropolitan mayor: Roberto Gualtieri (PD)

Area
  - Total: 5,363.28 km^{2} (2,070.77 sq mi)

Population (2026)
  - Total: 4,224,901
  - Density: 787.746/km^{2} (2,040.25/sq mi)

GDP
  - Metro: €163.462 billion
- Time zone: UTC+1 (CET)
  - Summer (DST): UTC+2 (CEST)
- Postal code: 00118–00199 (Roma); 00010–00069 (other municipalities)
- Telephone prefix: 06, 0761, 0765, 0766, 0774, 0769
- ISO 3166 code: IT-RM
- Vehicle registration: RM
- ISTAT code: 258
- Website: cittametropolitanaroma.gov.it

Metropolitan City of Rome Capital (Italian: città metropolitana di Roma Capitale) is an area of local government at the level of metropolitan city in the Lazio region of Italy. It comprises the territory of the city of Rome and 120 other comuni (sing.: comune) in the hinterland of the city. With a population of 4,224,901, it is the largest metropolitan city in Italy as of 2026.

It was established on 1 January 2015 by the terms of Law 142/1990 (Reform of local authorities) and by Law 56/2014. It superseded the province of Rome. The Metropolitan City of Rome Capital is headed by the Metropolitan Mayor (Sindaco metropolitano) and governed by the Metropolitan Council (Consiglio metropolitano). Roberto Gualtieri is the incumbent mayor, having taken office on 21 October 2021.

== Geography ==
The Metropolitan City of Rome Capital covers almost one-third of the territory of Lazio. It occupies the flat area of the Roman and the Tiber Valley to the mountains and dell'Aniene Lucretili Sabini and, in addition to the mountainous regions of the Tolfa and Monti Sabatini to the north-west, the area of the mountains Tiburtini Prenestini Simbruini and east, the area of the Colli Albani and the northern foothills of the mountains, and high Lepine Sacco valley to the south-east. The western boundary of the province is represented by the Tyrrhenian Sea on which spread to about 130 kilometres (81 mi) from the coast near Rome from Civitavecchia to Torre Astura. In the territory there are several lakes, almost all of volcanic origin, which are concentrated in the north-west of the mountains and Sabatini in the south-east of the Colli Albani.

== Demographics ==
As of 2026, the population is 4,224,901, of which 48.2% are male, and 51.8% are female. Minors make up 14.7% of the population, and seniors make up 23.8%.

Historical population

Year	Pop.	±%
1861	-	—
1871	433,044	—
1881	512,582	+18.4%
1901	716,746	+39.8%
1911	842,697	+17.6%
1921	1,018,148	+20.8%
1931	1,326,396	+30.3%
1936	1,562,843	+17.8%

Year	Pop.	±%
1951	2,150,670	+37.6%
1961	2,775,380	+29.0%
1971	3,490,377	+25.8%
1981	3,695,961	+5.9%
1991	3,761,067	+1.8%
2001	3,700,424	−1.6%
2011	3,997,465	+8.0%
2021	4,216,874	+5.5%

Source: ISTAT

=== Immigration ===
As of 2025, immigrants make up 13.9% of the population. The 5 largest foreign countries of birth are Romania, Bangladesh, the Philippines, Ukraine, and Egypt.

== Government ==
=== Metropolitan Council ===
The new Metro municipalities, giving large urban areas the administrative powers of a province, are conceived for improving the performance of local administrations and to slash local spending by better coordinating the municipalities in providing basic services (including transport, school and social programs) and environment protection. In this policy framework, the Mayor of Rome is designated to exercise the functions of Metropolitan mayor, presiding over a Metropolitan Council. The Council consists of mayors and city councillors of each comune in the Metropolitan City elected from amongst themselves using partially open list proportional representation, with seats allocated using the D'Hondt method. Metropolitan councillors are elected at-large for five-year terms; votes for metropolitan councillors are weighted by grouping comunes of a certain population range into nine groups so that votes of the mayors and city councillors of the more populous groups are worth than those of less populous groups.

The Metropolitan Council of the city was elected on 20 December 2021:

Group	Seats
Centre-left coalition (PD • A • IV)	14 / 24
Centre-right coalition (FdI • L)	8 / 24
Five Star Movement (M5S)	2 / 24

=== List of metropolitan mayors ===
	Metropolitan Mayor	Term start	Term end	Party
1	Ignazio Marino	1 January 2015	31 October 2015	PD
Special commissioner (31 October 2015 – 22 June 2016)
2	Virginia Raggi	22 June 2016	21 October 2021	M5S
3	Roberto Gualtieri	21 October 2021	Incumbent	PD

=== Administrative divisions ===
There are 121 municipalities of the Metropolitan City of Rome Capital. The 10 largest municipalities by population are:

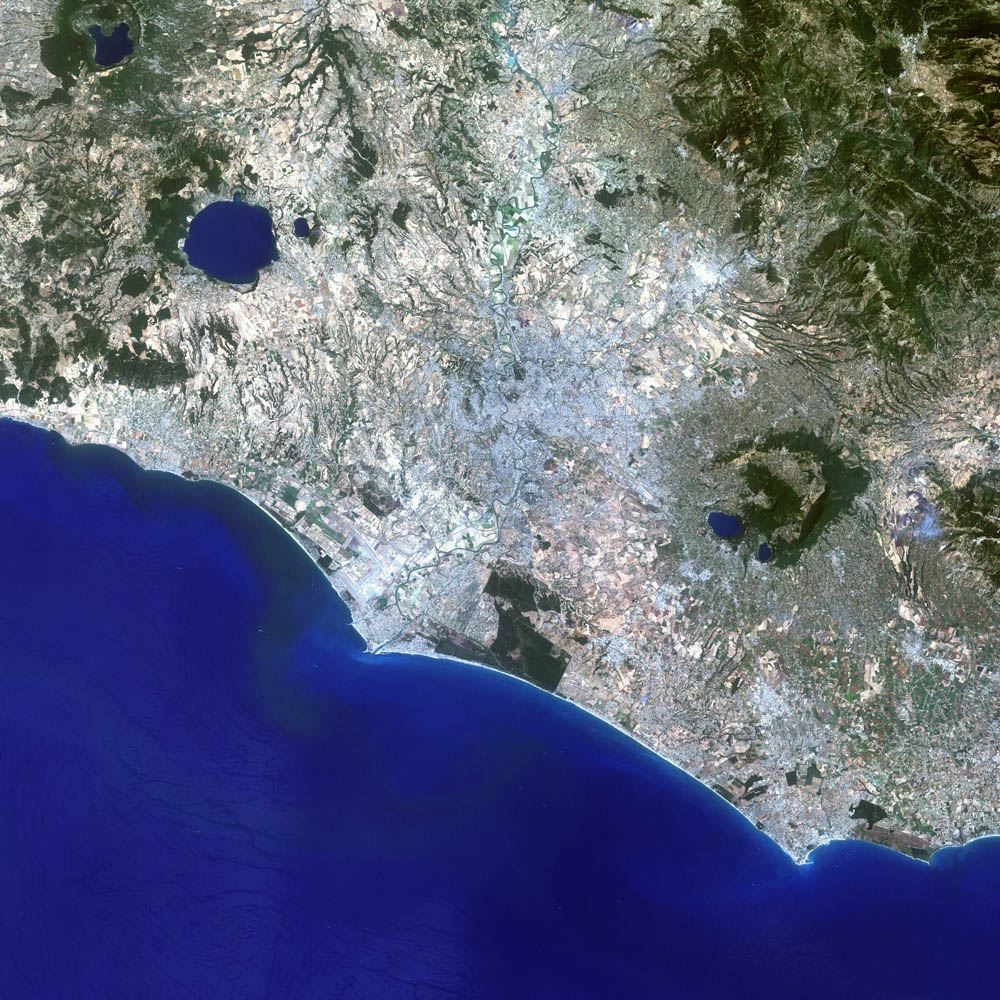
Satellite picture of Rome metropolitan area.

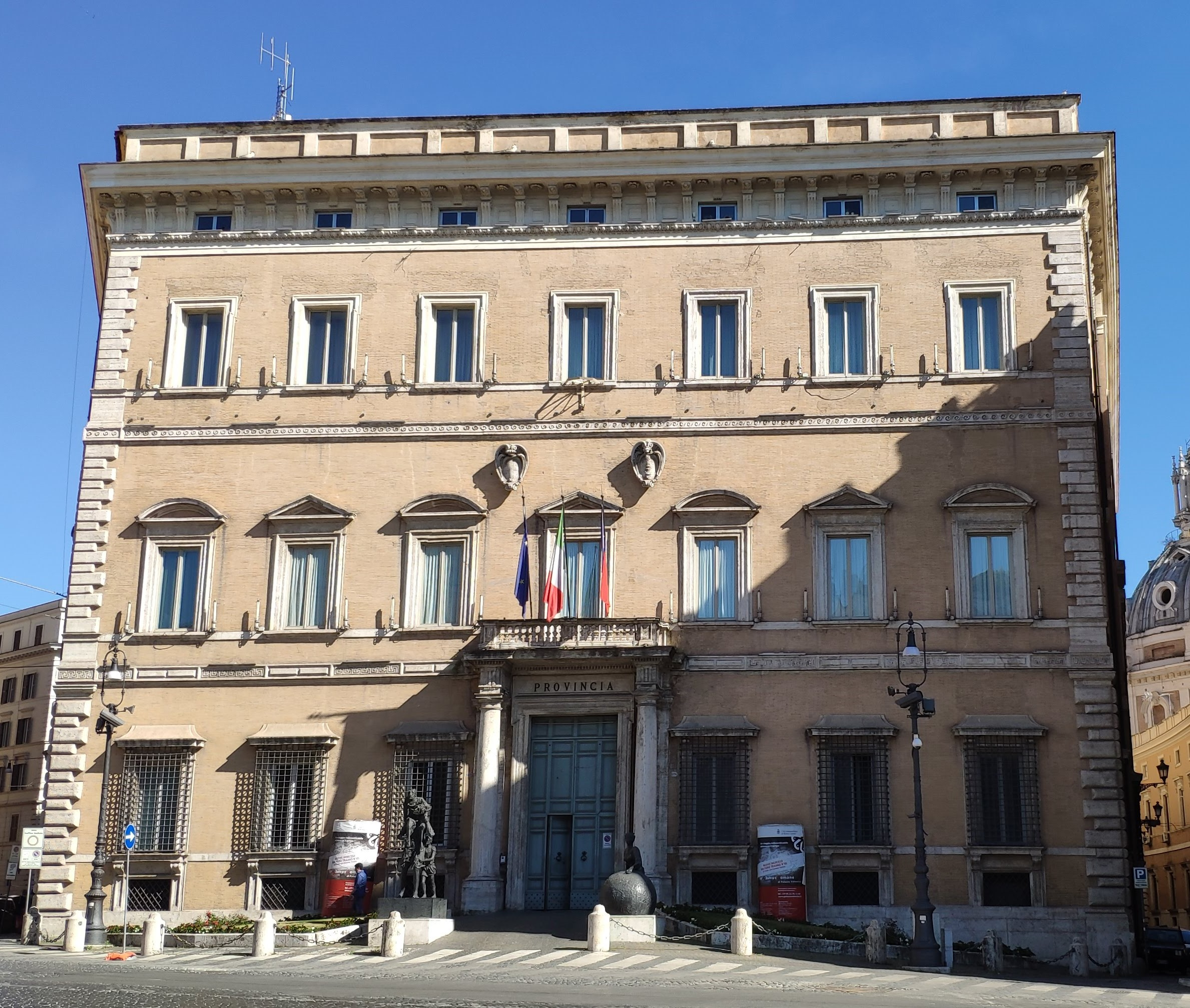
Palazzo Valentini is the seat of the Metropolitan Council.

#	Municipality	Population (2026)	Area (km^{2})	Density	Altitude (mslm)
1	Rome	2,745,062	1,287.36	2,132.3	21
2	Guidonia Montecelio	89,420	79.47	1,125.2	105
3	Fiumicino	83,415	213.89	390.0	1
4	Pomezia	64,970	86.57	750.5	108
5	Anzio	60,063	43.65	1,376.0	3
6	Tivoli	55,321	68.65	805.8	235
7	Velletri	53,048	118.23	448.7	332
9	Ardea	51,374	72.09	712.6	37
8	Civitavecchia	51,359	73.74	696.5	10
10	Nettuno	48,111	71.64	671.6	11

=== Municipal government ===
Here is a list of the municipal government in cities and towns with more than 15,000 inhabitants:

Municipality	Mayor	Party	Executive	Term
Rome	Roberto Gualtieri	PD	PD • EV • SI	2021–2026
Guidonia Montecelio	Mauro Lomabrdo	Ind	Ind	2022–2027
Fiumicino	Mario Baccini	Ind	FI • L • FdI • UDC	2023–2028
Pomezia	Veronica Felici	Ind	FI • L • FdI	2023–2028
Anzio	Aurelio Lo Fazio	PD	PD • M5S • Ind	2024–2029
Tivoli	Marco Innocenzi	FdI	FI • L • FdI	2024–2029
Velletri	Ascanio Cascella	FdI	FI • L • FdI	2023–2028
Civitavecchia	Marco Piendibene	PD	PD • M5S • AVS	2024–2029
Ardea	Maurizio Cremonini	FdI	FI • L • FdI	2022–2027
Nettuno	Nicola Burrini	PD	PD	2024–2029
Marino	Stefano Cecchi	Ind	FI • L	2021–2026
Monterotondo	Riccardo Varone	PD	PD • AVS	2024–2029
Ladispoli	Alessandro Grando	Ind	FI • L • FdI	2022–2027
Albano Laziale	Massimo Borelli	PD	PD • Ind	2020–2025
Ciampino	Emanuele Colella	PD	PD • Ind	2022–2027

== Transport ==
Integrated map of public rail transport in the Rome hub. The Rome Metro and the suburban railway service FL lines.

The Metropolitan City of Rome Capital is the centre of a radial network of roads that roughly follow the lines of the ancient Roman roads which began at the Capitoline Hill and connected Rome with its empire. Today Rome is circled, at a distance of about 10 km (6 mi) from the Capitol, by the ring-road (the Grande Raccordo Anulare or GRA).

Due to its location in the centre of the Italian peninsula, Rome is the principal railway node for central Italy. Rome's main railway station, Termini, is one of the largest railway stations in Europe and the most heavily used in Italy, with around 400 thousand travellers passing through every day. The second-largest station in the city, Roma Tiburtina, has been redeveloped as a high-speed rail terminus.

Rome is served by three airports. The intercontinental Leonardo da Vinci International Airport is Italy's chief airport, is located within the nearby Fiumicino, south-west of Rome. The older Rome Ciampino Airport is a joint civilian and military airport. It is commonly referred to as "Ciampino Airport", as it is located beside Ciampino, south-east of Rome. A third airport, the Rome Urbe Airport, is a small, low-traffic airport serving general aviation and private planes located about 6 km (4 mi) north of the city centre, which handles most helicopter and private flights.

The city has its own quarter on the Mediterranean Sea (Lido di Ostia), equipped with a tourist port and a small channel-harbour for fisher boats. The main harbour which serves Rome is the Port of Civitavecchia, located about 62 km (39 mi) northwest of the city, part of the "Motorways of the Sea", it is linked to several Mediterranean ports and is one of the busiest cruise ports in the world.

A 3-line metro system called the Metropolitana operates in the Metropolitan City of Rome. Construction on the first branch started in the 1930s. The line had been planned to quickly connect the main railway station with the newly planned E42 area in the southern suburbs, where the 1942 World Fair was supposed to be held. The event never took place because of war, but the area was later partly redesigned and renamed EUR (Esposizione Universale di Roma: Rome Universal Exhibition) in the 1950s to serve as a modern business district. The line was finally opened in 1955, and it is now the south part of the B Line.

The A line opened in 1980 from Ottaviano to Anagnina stations, later extended in stages (1999–2000) to Battistini. In the 1990s, an extension of the B line was opened from Termini to Rebibbia. This underground network is generally reliable (although it may become very congested at peak times and during events, especially the A line) as it is relatively short.

The A and B lines intersect at Roma Termini station. A new branch of the B line (B1) opened on 13 June 2012 after an estimated building cost of €500 million. B1 connects to line B at Piazza Bologna and has four stations over a distance of 3.9 km (2 mi).

A third line, the C line, is under construction with an estimated cost of €3 billion and will have 30 stations over a distance of 25.5 km (16 mi). It will partly replace the existing Termini-Pantano rail line. It will feature full automated, driverless trains. The first section with 15 stations connecting Pantano with the quarter of Centocelle in the eastern part of the city, opened on 9 November 2014. The end of the work was scheduled in 2015, but archaeological findings often delay underground construction work.

A fourth line, D line, is also planned. It will have 22 stations over a distance of 20 km (12 mi).

== Gallery ==
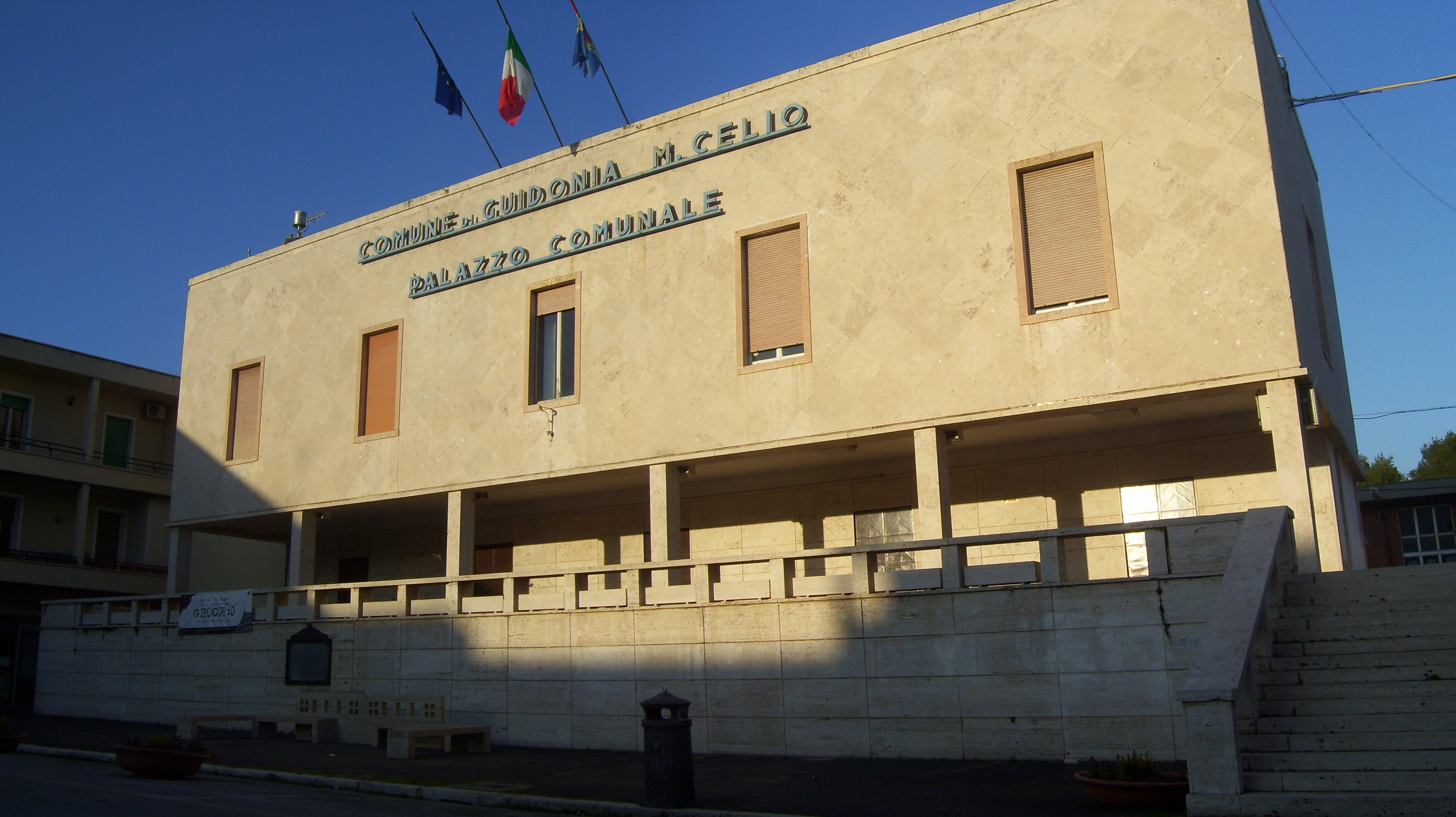
Guidonia Montecelio

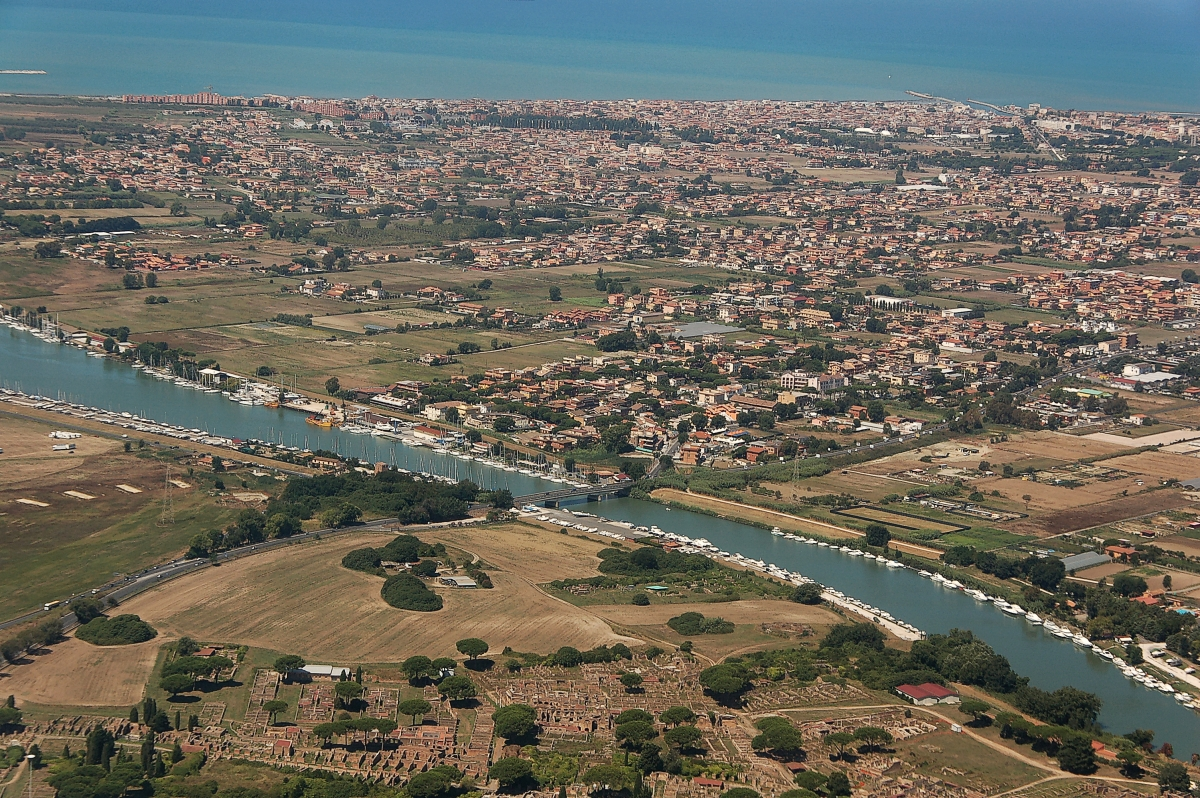
Fiumicino

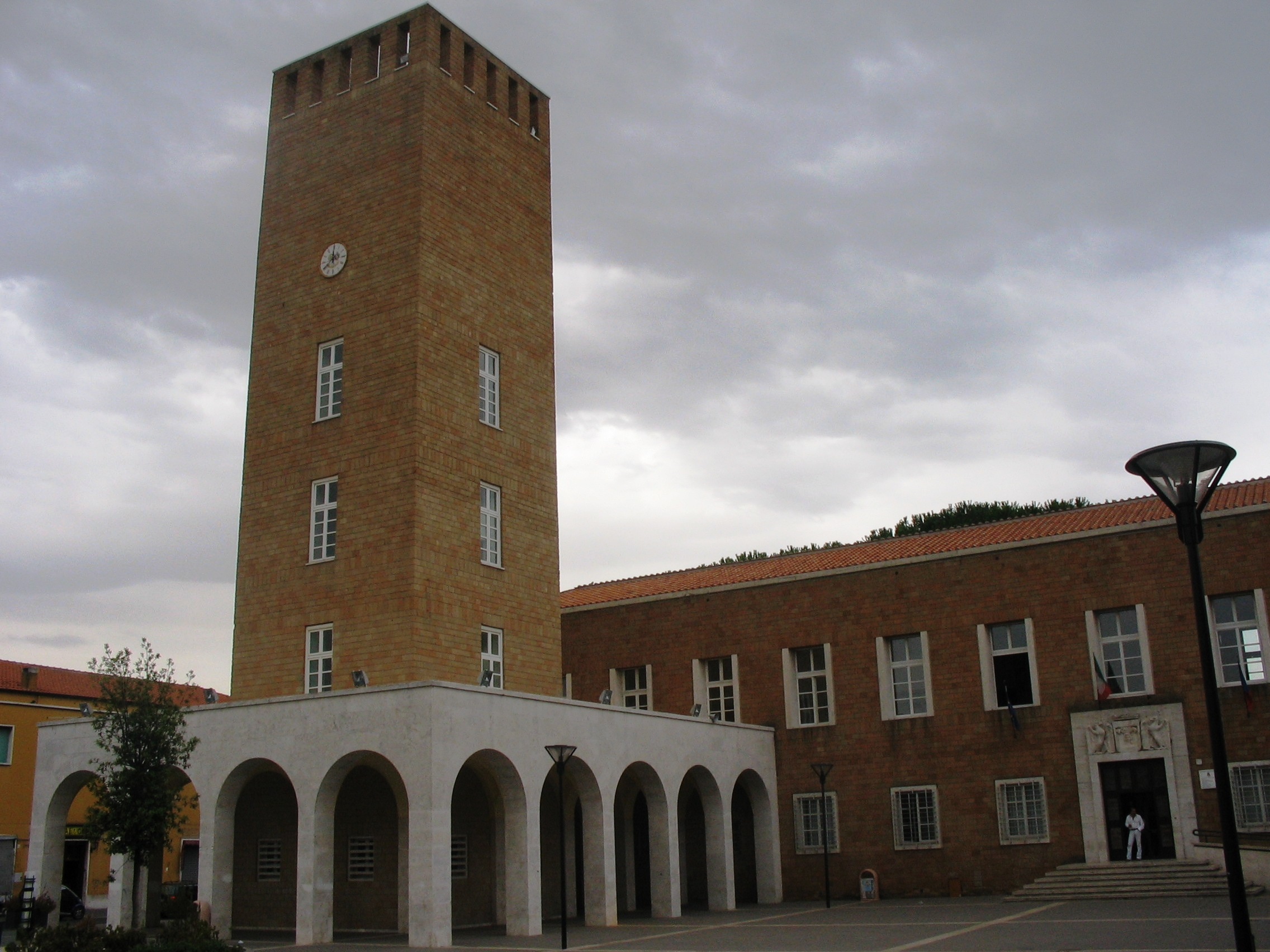
Pomezia

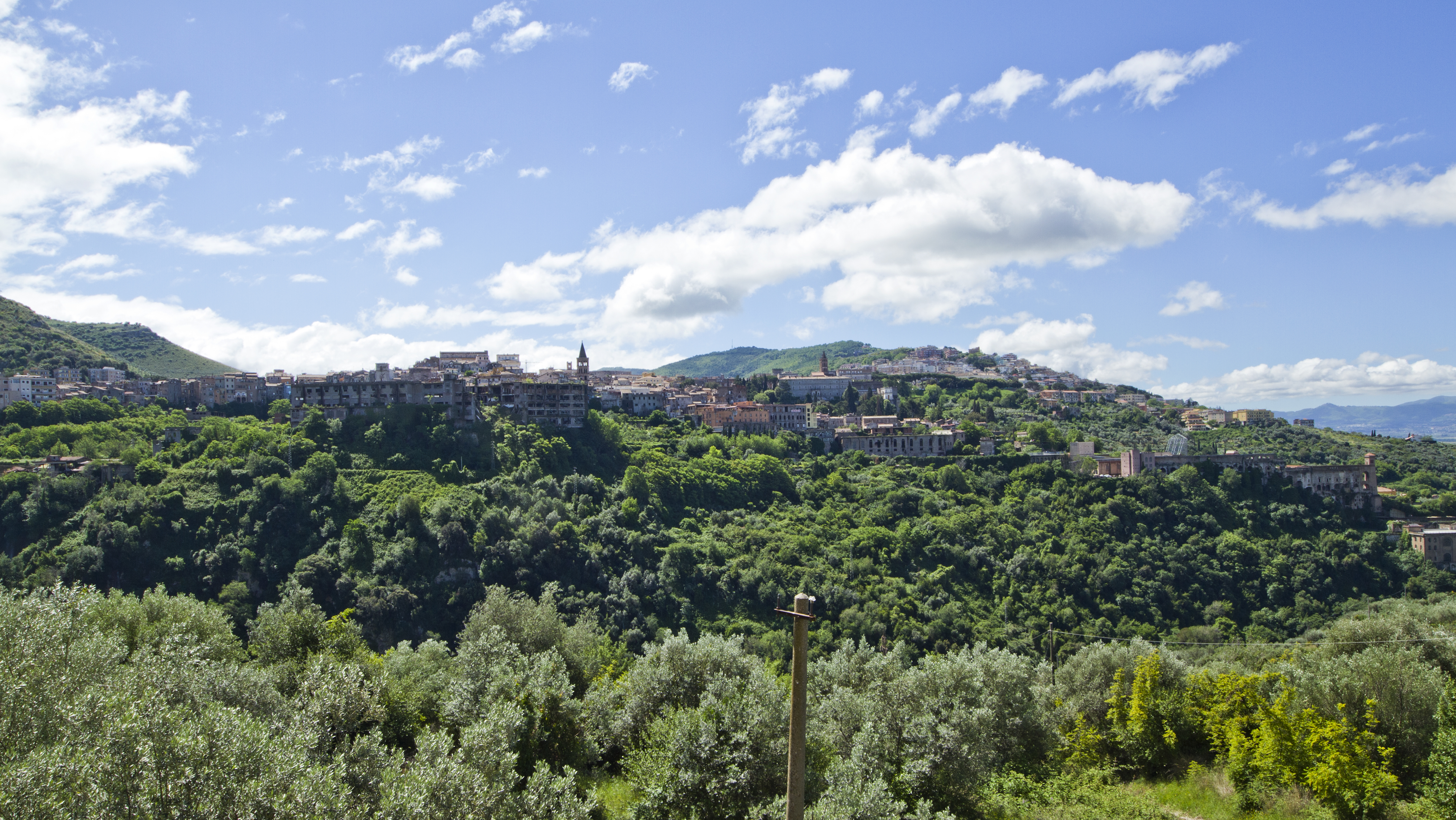
Tivoli

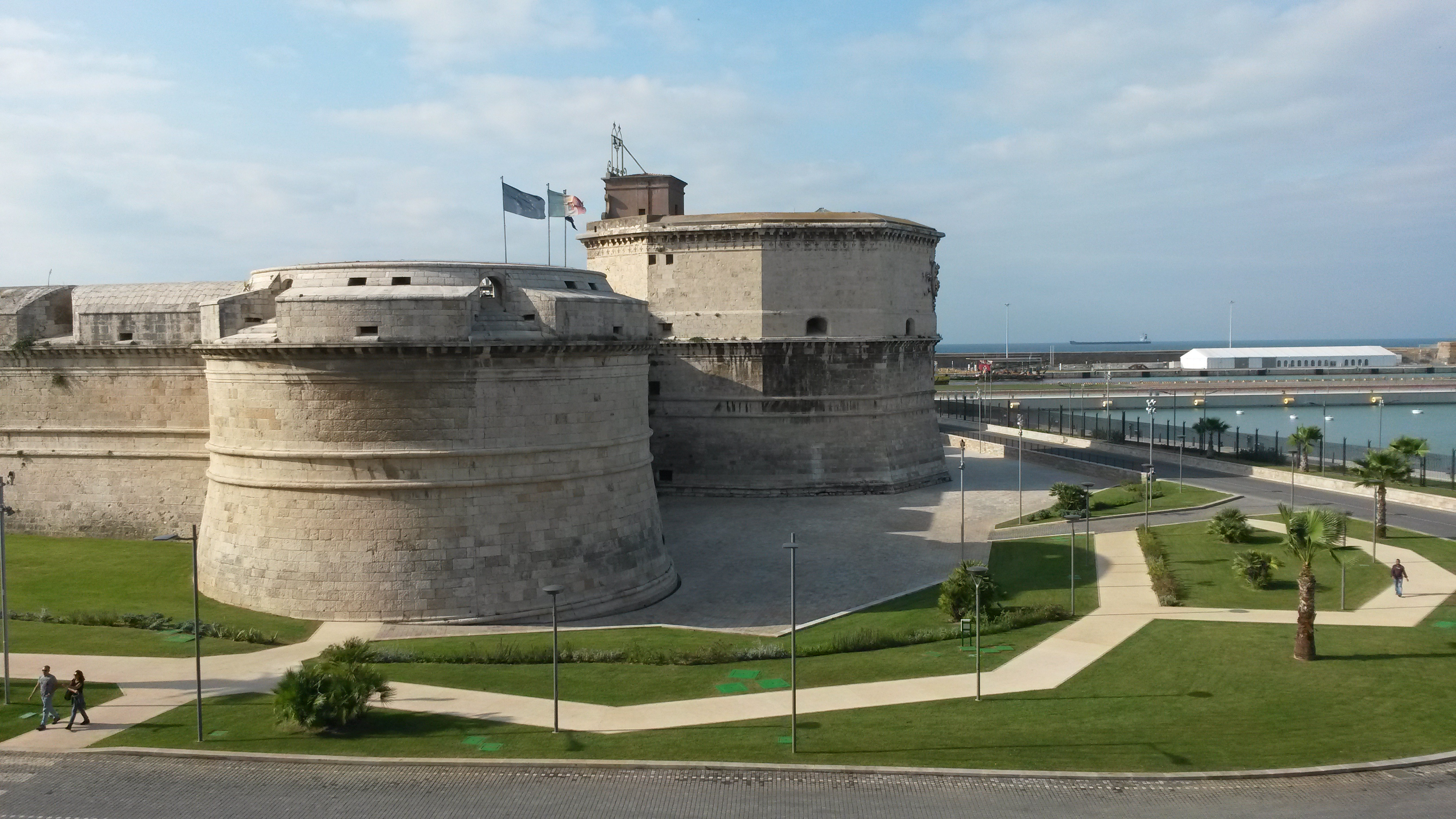
Civitavecchia

== See also ==
- Province of Rome
- Castelletto (district)
