= Madonna with the Blue Diadem =

Painting by Raphael and Gianfrancesco Penni

- Artist: Raphael
- Year: c. 1510-1518
- Type: Oil on wood
- Dimensions: 68 cm × 48 cm (27 in × 19 in)
- Location: Louvre, Paris

The Madonna with the Blue Diadem is a painting by Raphael and his pupil Gianfrancesco Penni, and was most likely painted in Rome around 1510-1512, now at the Louvre. In the Louvre, the painting is named Virgin and Child with the Infant Saint John, also known as Virgin with the Veil or Virgin with the Blue Diadem. Additional names include Virgin with the Linen, Slumbering Child and Silence of the Holy Virgin.

== History ==
Legend has it that at one time the panel, split in two, was used to cover casks in Pescia. Once found, they are said to have been expertly joined. There is also a different version where the panel was split into three pieces to make a screen, which was made whole again.

By the later part of the 16th century, it had been in the Chateauneuf Collection, Paris and descended to his heir, the Marquis de la Vallière. In 1620 the painting was owned by the Marquis de la Vallière, Secretary of State, as part of the La Vallière Collection in Paris. In 1713, Prince Louis Alexandre, Count of Toulouse, owned the painting and from him it passed in 1728 into the collection of the Prince of Carignano.

From at least 1728 to 1743 it was in the possession of Victor Amadeus I, Prince of Carignano. After he died, the painting fell to his son Louis Victor, Prince of Carignano and the painter Hyacinthe Rigaud mediated the sale to Louis XV in 1743. It was the last Raphael painting to enter the French Royal Collection

== Description ==
Although there are several artists involved, the composition is almost certainly that of Raphael. Due to the use of bright, acid colors and the porcelain-like finish, it is thought that the finishing of the composition may have been the work of one of his pupils, Gianfrancesco Penni, and to be dated around 1518.

The painting is similar to the Madonna of Loreto (Musée Condé, Chantilly), featuring the symbolic lifting of the veil. The use of veil in Renaissance paintings, from the Meditations on the Life of Christ, symbolizes the manner in which the Madonna wrapped the Child in the veil from her head at the Nativity and, prophetically, again at the Crucifixion.

Here the Virgin lifts the veil over the sleeping Child, who is turned toward the audience, with her other arm around the young John the Baptist, who has a reed across his shoulder. Both the Virgin and John are in profile. Attached to a blue diadem, a veil that flows down her head, across her shoulders and clings to her arms. A draped tunic, belted at the waist, flowing overtop her red underdress.

While the paintings has some similarity to the Madonna of Loreto, Raphael make a more dramatic statement, such as through the use of ruins of the Sacchetti Villa and vineyard, near St. Peter's Basilica in Rome.

There is also refinement in the features and limbs of the Christ child. The child is very calm, contrasted to the expression of awe and adoration by the young John.
