= Oasi di Porto (Fiumicino) =

Special Protection Area in Fiumicino

- Lago di Traiano
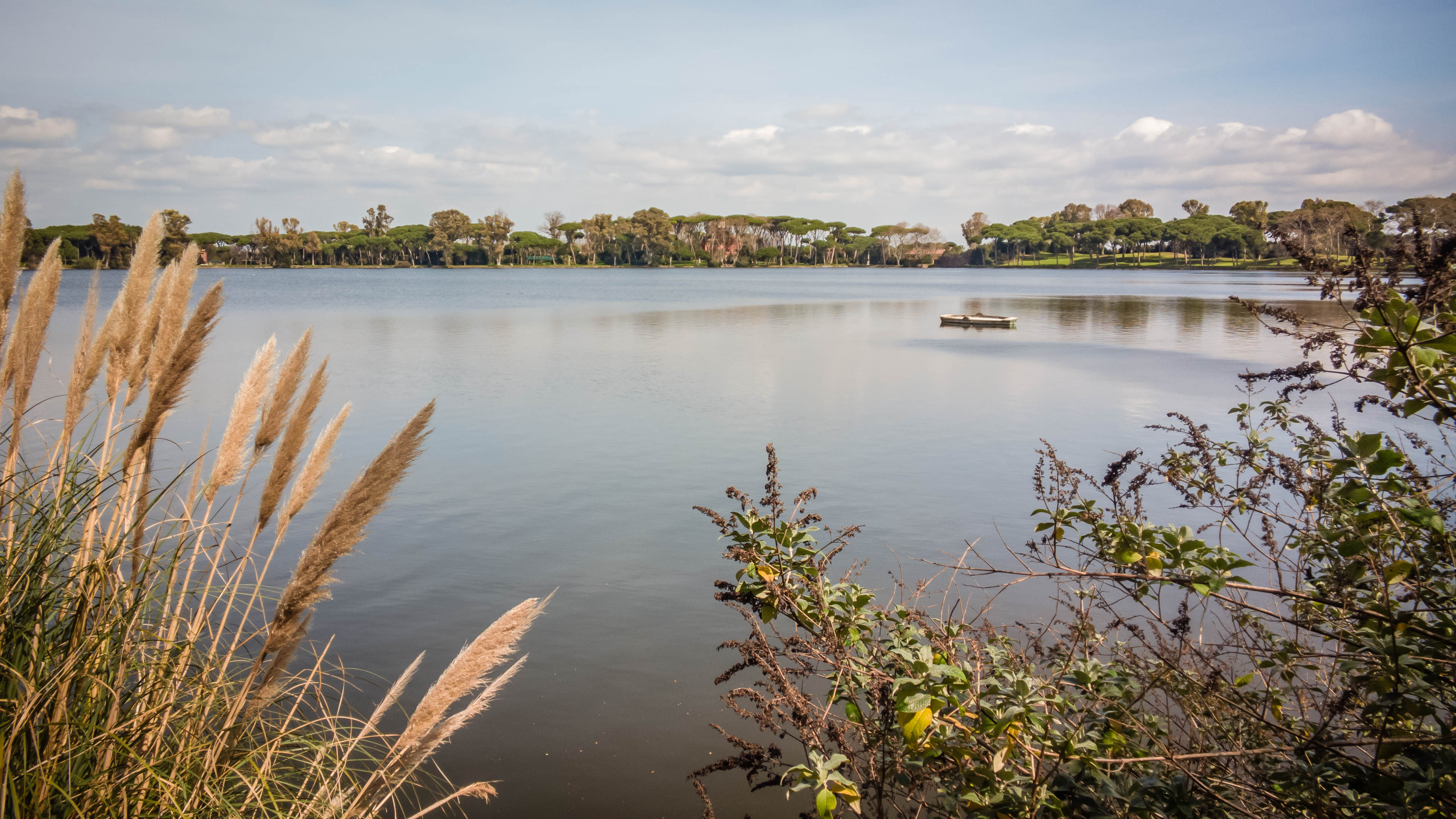
- A photo showcasing the lake in Oasi di Porto (known as "Lago di Traiano") and its surrounding flora
- Interactive map of Oasi di Porto
- Location: Fiumicino
- Nearest city: Fiumicino and Isola Sacra
- Established: 1993
- Governing body: Fondazione Portus Onlus

Oasi di Porto is an ancient port basin located on the western bank of the Tiber river. Following its decline it became increasingly ruined and infested with malaria, until Alessandro Torlonia reclaimed the area. Today its a 33-hectare lake which guests numerous species of migratory birds and is considered a Special Protection Area due to its biodiversity and also due to its archeological importance.

== History ==
=== Antiquity ===
In AD 42, the Emperor Claudius ordered the construction of a large harbour north of the mouth of the Tiber to provide a permanent solution to the silting of the river port of Ostia, which had gradually become increasingly difficult to use as the coastline advanced. The Harbour of Claudius was strategically designed with two outlets, one to the sea and the other to the Tiber. This arrangement allowed goods arriving on seagoing vessels to be transferred to river craft for transport upstream to the centre of Rome.

Construction was completed in AD 64, during the reign of Nero. Upon its completion, the harbour basin covered approximately 150 hectares and was dominated by a large multi-storey lighthouse. Over time, however, silting also rendered the Claudian harbour increasingly unusable, making the construction of a second harbour necessary. The new port, commissioned by Emperor Trajan and subsequently named after him, incorporated the quays and lighthouse of the earlier harbour while greatly expanding its facilities. Its most distinctive feature was a 33-hectare hexagonal basin, which substantially increased the number of berths available for seagoing vessels.

The Harbour of Trajan rapidly assumed a central role in Rome's commercial network, prompting the construction of extensive warehouses, including the Trajanic and Severan Warehouses, the Imperial Palace, a monumental building used to accommodate high-ranking visitors, and a settlement that was officially granted city status in AD 314 under the name Portus Romae. During the IV Century and the V Century, defensive walls were constructed around the harbour to protect it from barbarian incursions and to prevent hostile forces from advancing along the Tiber towards Rome.

These changing security conditions also affected the handling of goods, which were increasingly transferred directly to river vessels without passing through the port's warehouses. The progressive abandonment of the harbour, combined with the continued advance of the coastline, led to the gradual decline of the port infrastructure, which, owing to inadequate maintenance, slowly became marshland. The area subsequently acquired a reputation for being unhealthy because of the prevalence of malaria.

=== Contemporary period ===
It was not until the nineteenth century, after the estate became the property of Prince Alessandro Torlonia, that extensive land reclamation works transformed the area. He practically transformed the estate's former hunting lodge into a turreted villa modelled on the Villa Sacchetti at Castel Fusano and planted a pine grove on the site of the former rural procoio (livestock enclosure), linking it to the Fiumicino railway by a long tree-lined avenue. The reclamation of the Lake of Portus and its conversion into a freshwater reservoir was completed in 1924 by his grandson Giovanni Torlonia, who further modernized the estate through extensive agricultural improvements. In 1949, the estate passed to Duchess Maria Torlonia, sister of Giovanni Torlonia and wife of Duke Lorenzo Sforza Cesarini.

During the post-war period, the Portus countryside was significantly altered by the construction of Rome Fiumicino Airport and by unplanned urban development along the former reclamation landscape. From the 1970s onward, following a legal dispute between the Italian state and the Archaeological Superintendency of Ostia on one side and Duke Ascanio Sforza Cesarini, grandson of Duchess Maria, on the other, over the public ownership of the Parco Rustico di Porto, the duke undertook an important programme to preserve and enhance the portion of the estate that remained in private hands. In 1993, the Oasi di Porto was established as an archaeological and natural park of high ecological value and was later designated a Special Protection Area (SPA). Since 2007, it has been managed by the Fondazione Portus Onlus.

=== 21st century ===
The Harbour of Trajan is valued not only for its historical and archaeological significance but also for its environmental importance. Visitors can see the remains of the ancient warehouses and storage facilities, as well as the 33-hectare hexagonal basin, now an artificial lake fed by the waters of the Tiber that provides a habitat for hundreds of plant and animal species. More than 130 species of migratory birds have been recorded, including ducks, black-winged stilts (Himantopus himantopus), black-necked and great crested grebes (Podiceps nigricollis and Podiceps cristatus), grey herons, cormorants, coots (Fulica), gulls, terns, and little grebes (Tachybaptus ruficollis).

The lake also supports a rich fish fauna, including perch, European sturgeon (Acipenser sturio), northern pike (Esox lucius), eels, mullet, catfish, and carp. A small herd of fallow deer can also occasionally be observed. The vegetation includes plane trees, pines, ash trees, and holm oaks. The extensive land reclamation works carried out during the nineteenth century also left large plantations of eucalyptus, principally Eucalyptus globulus and Eucalyptus camaldulensis. Within the oasis is a small area known as the Butterfly Garden, named for the numerous shrubs whose flowers and fragrances attract a wide variety of butterfly species.
