= Quagliata =

Quagliata may refer to

- Giovanni Quagliata (1603–1673), Italian Baroque painter
- Nicolás Quagliata (1999–), Uruguayan fottballer
- Giacomo Quagliata (2000-), Italian footballer
- Prescinsêua, a Ligurian cheese
