= Adriano Zabarelli =

Italian painter

Adriano Zabarelli (c. 1610–1680), also known as Andrea Palladino or il Palladino, was an Italian painter of the Baroque period. He was born and active in Cortona, although he was a pupil of Pietro da Cortona in Rome.
