= Loyola Rome =

Coordinates: 41°55′46.62″N 12°26′15.23″E

- Via Massimi, Monte Mario, Rome

Information
- Type: Jesuit, Catholic
- Established: 1962; 64 years ago
- Enrollment: 500
- Affiliation: Loyola University Chicago
- Website: LoyolaRome

Loyola Rome (formerly the John Felice Rome Center) is a campus of Loyola University Chicago in Rome, Italy. The center was founded as CIVIS (Casa Italiana Viaggi Internazionali Studenti) in January 1962, hosted on premises built for the Olympic Village of the 1960 Summer Olympics, and leased from the Italian Ministry of Foreign Affairs. In 1966 the school relocated to Monte Mario, an upscale area in northwest Rome which is the highest point in the city. After two intermediate relocations, it moved in 1978 to its present location, on Via Massimi, in a residential neighborhood on Monte Mario. In Spring 2009, Loyola University Chicago purchased the building and surrounding property, making Monte Mario the permanent home of the Rome Center.

== History ==
The school and its program was founded by Rev. John P. Felice, a Maltese Jesuit who had become a U.S. citizen. Felice's dream and life's work centered on this school. Felice had been an intelligence officer in the British Eighth Army during World War II and served as a liaison officer under General George Patton in preparation for the invasion of Sicily and the Italian mainland.

Entering the Jesuit order, Felice was ordained a Jesuit priest and assigned to teach theology at Loyola University of Chicago. His dream of a campus where American students could live and study abroad was realized with the founding of the Loyola University "Rome Center" in 1962. Felice was its founder and served as its director until 1973. Shortly thereafter he left the priesthood. However he remained continuously associated with the Rome Center throughout his life, first as a "consultant" and then returning in various administrative positions, finally returning as director in the late 1980s.

Felice maintained extensive connections in Rome, including within the Vatican, the Carabinieri and the Italian government. During World War II he served with the British armed forces. Under his leadership, the Rome Center grew substantially, enrolling thousands of students over time. Former students and colleagues have credited him with being accessible and personally engaged with students, staff, and visiting alumni.

Felice retired as director in 1998 and was named "Director Emeritus." The Center was renamed the "John Felice Rome Center of Loyola University Chicago" (JFRC) in honor of John Felice in 2005. (The previous official name was "The Rome Center of Liberal Arts".) Today, in the circles of Loyola and the JFRC alumni, which now total over 14,000, Felice is revered for his leadership and innovation in developing the JFRC, his persistent dedication to the JFRC and his untiring work on behalf of the JFRC until his death in early 2008.

== Programs ==
Today, Loyola Rome is the second largest study abroad program in Italy and one of the oldest and most successful in Western Europe. Over 400 students attend either or both semesters each year. It was led by Todd Waller, who was welcomed back in 2021 as director. Todd Waller is the founding Director of the Spring Hill College Italy Center in Bologna Italy. He has also directed two documentary films, and is the recipient of a doctorate in International Education from the University of London. He had previously served as associate dean of students from 2003 to 2009 and as dean of students from 2009 to 2010. Loyola Rome has gone through a dramatic transformation since the campus was purchased, ensuring its permanent home. An ambitious and highly successful fundraising effort was spearheaded by Iodice, a former director, to renovate the facilities and plan for the construction of a new building to house the growing number of students who wish to study at Loyola Rome. New academic programs were begun, including Rome Start, where students spend their freshman year in Rome, and then finish their program in Chicago. Luca Badetti, author of "I Believe in You", acts as the Rome Start program coordinator. PROLAW, which is a Masters in the Rule of Law, and a dual degree program between Loyola Andalucia and Loyola University Chicago are examples of other programs also hosted by Loyola Rome. The administrative and student life departments of Loyola Rome took on more student-focused activities and improved management and financial processes and procedures. By 2016, Loyola Rome was considered the benchmark for best practices in the management of study abroad programs. In addition, the Rome Center became the standard for safety and security for American campuses abroad and worked to assist other US universities to improve their security measures.

In addition to offering a liberal arts curriculum, Loyola Rome plans study tours for its students throughout Italy.

In the Spring of 2008, it hosted its first international conference, "The Cross, The Crescent and the Ballot Box", a two-day symposium regarding the history and common ground of Islam and Christianity.

Students at Loyola Rome attend classes four days a week, and most travel during the weekends to various places in Western Europe, Eastern Europe, and Northern Africa.

Undergraduate enrollment each year is approximately 500 students. Most of the students are Loyola University Chicago students, while others are from various other universities in the United States, and often from other Jesuit Institutions.

== See also ==
- List of Jesuit sites
