= Portrait of Pope Julius II =

Painting by Raphael

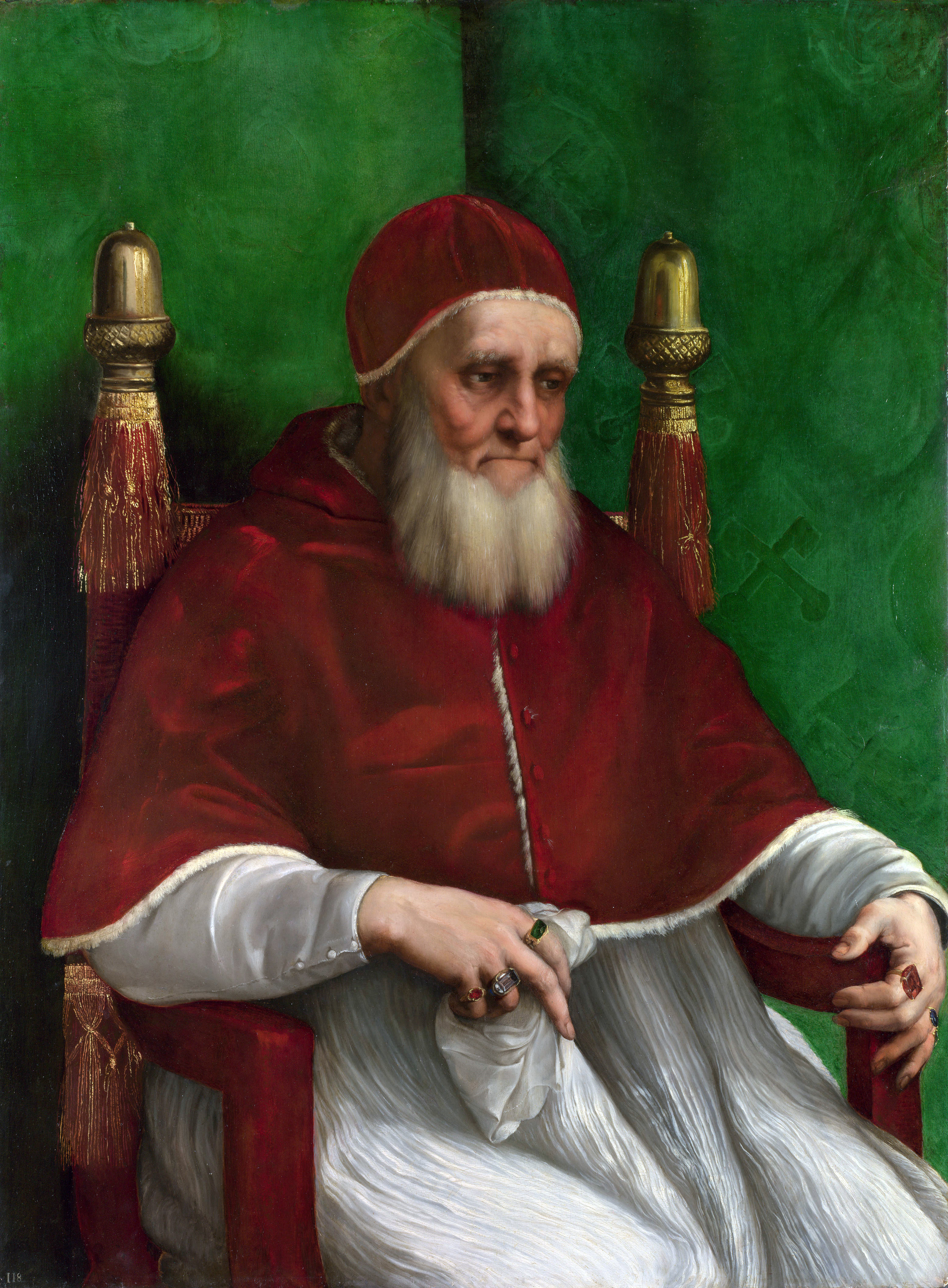
- Artist: Raphael
- Year: 1511–1512
- Medium: Oil on wood
- Dimensions: 108 cm × 80.7 cm (43 in × 31.8 in)
- Location: National Gallery, London, Uffizi and other versions

Portrait of Pope Julius II is an oil painting of 1511–1512 by the Italian High Renaissance painter Raphael. The portrait of Pope Julius II was unusual for its time and would carry a long influence on papal portraiture. From early in its life, it was specially hung at the pillars of the church of Santa Maria del Popolo, on the main route from the north into Rome, on feast and high holy days. Giorgio Vasari, writing long after Julius' death, said that "it was so lifelike and true it frightened everyone who saw it, as if it were the living man himself".

The painting exists in many versions and copies, and for many years, a version of the painting which now hangs in the Uffizi Gallery in Florence was believed to be the original or prime version, but in 1970 opinion shifted. The original is currently believed to be the version located in the National Gallery, London.

== Composition ==
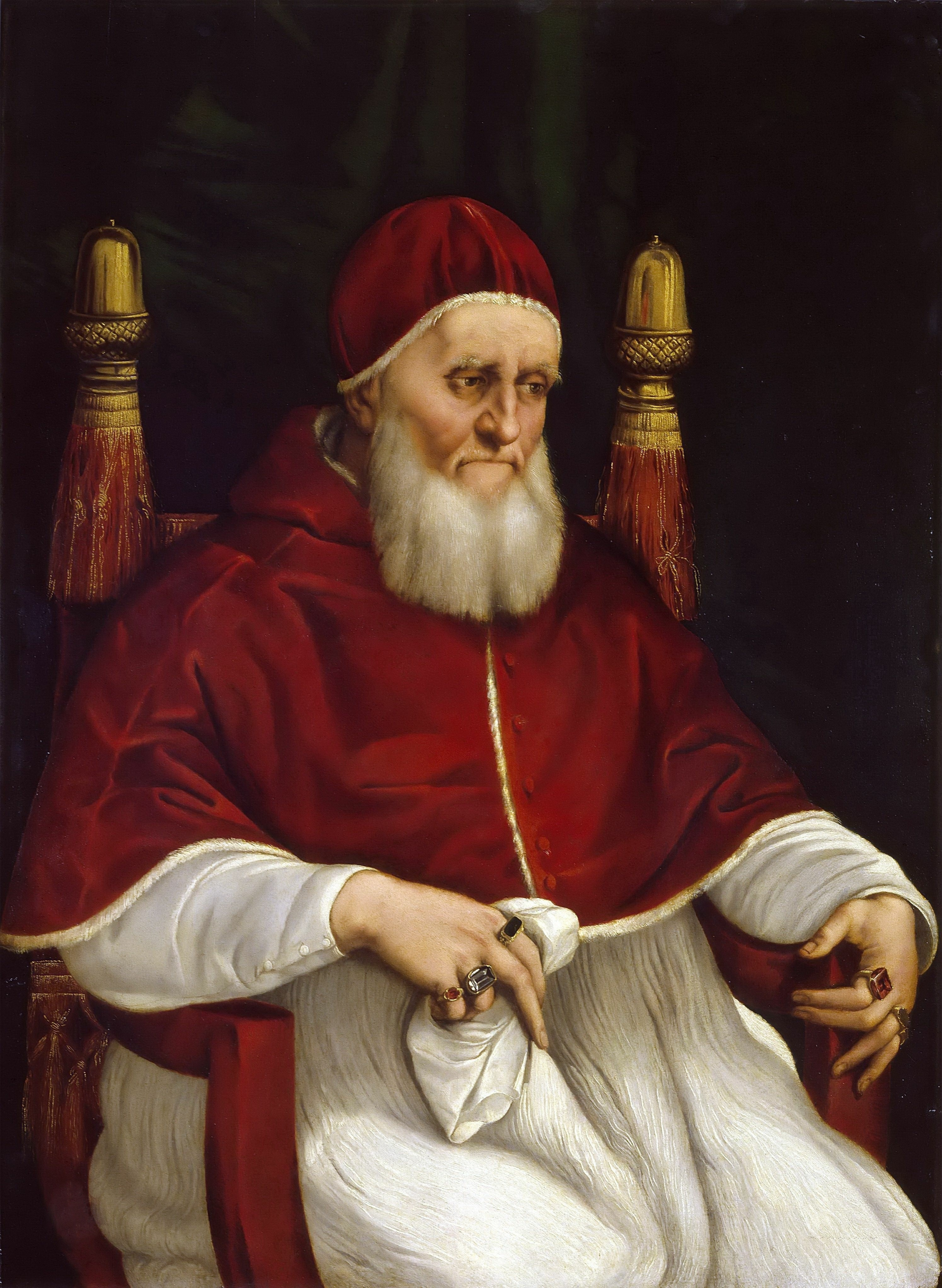
The Uffizi version

The presentation of the subject was unusual for its time. Previous papal portraits showed them frontally, or kneeling in profile. It was also "exceptional" at this period to show the sitter so evidently in a particular mood—here lost in thought. The intimacy of this image was unprecedented in papal portraiture, but became the model, "what became virtually a formula", followed by most future painters, including Sebastiano del Piombo and Diego Velázquez. The painting "established a type for papal portraits that endured for about two centuries." According to Erika Langmuir, "it was the conflation of ceremonial significance and intimacy which was so startling, combined with Raphael's ability to define the inner structure of things along with their outer texture".

The painting can be dated to between June 1511 and March 1512, when Julius let his beard grow as a sign of mourning for the loss in war of the city of Bologna. Raphael had also included fresco portraits of the bearded Julius, representing earlier popes, in the Raphael Rooms of the Vatican Palace, in The Mass at Bolsena, with portraits of his daughter Felice della Rovere and Raphael himself in the same group, and in the painting representing Jurisprudence round a window in the Stanza della Segnatura, as well as in the Sistine Madonna.

The original hanging in the background was a blue and gold textile, either woven silk or embroidery, with gold emblems in tear shaped light blue compartments against a dark blue background. The emblems were the papal crossed keys, the papal tiara, and perhaps the heraldic oak tree of Julius's family, the Della Rovere ("Of the oak"). This was overpainted by Raphael with the green cloth now seen, which itself was painted over before 1824 to give a plain dark background. The finials of the chair are also formed as acorns to represent the Della Rovere emblem. The six finger rings with large jewels reflect another of Julius's obsessions, which caused Michelangelo to walk away from his service to him.

According to the 1901 catalogue of the National Gallery, "This portrait was repeated several times by Raphael, or his scholars. Johann David Passavant enumerates nine repetitions...besides three of the head only." There is a possible cartoon for the London version in Palazzo Corsini, Florence, and a red chalk drawing at Chatsworth House.

== Provenance ==
The provenances of the various versions of this painting are constructed based on documents, analysis of the paintings and preliminary sketches. For over two centuries the prime version of the painting remained together with the Madonna of Loreto, first at Santa Maria del Popolo until 1591, then in private collections; then for a time in the early 19th century its location was unknown.

Until 1970 it was commonly believed that the London version of the painting was a studio copy of the Raphael original, which was believed to be the version in the Uffizi Gallery, Florence. In 1969 Konrad Oberhuber of the National Gallery of Art in Washington asked the National Gallery to take x-ray photographs of their version. These revealed that the background of the painting behind the chair had been entirely repainted, concealing an inventory number from the Borghese collection and the green textile hanging now visible after the overpaint was removed in 1970. Small paint samples removed during this cleaning showed that there had been an even earlier hanging with a coloured pattern. The National Gallery's Cecil Gould published the results of the research in 1970, asserting that Raphael's original had been rediscovered, an attribution that is now generally accepted. However, the attribution was challenged in 1996 by James Beck in an article in Artibus et Historiae.

=== Santa Maria del Popolo ===
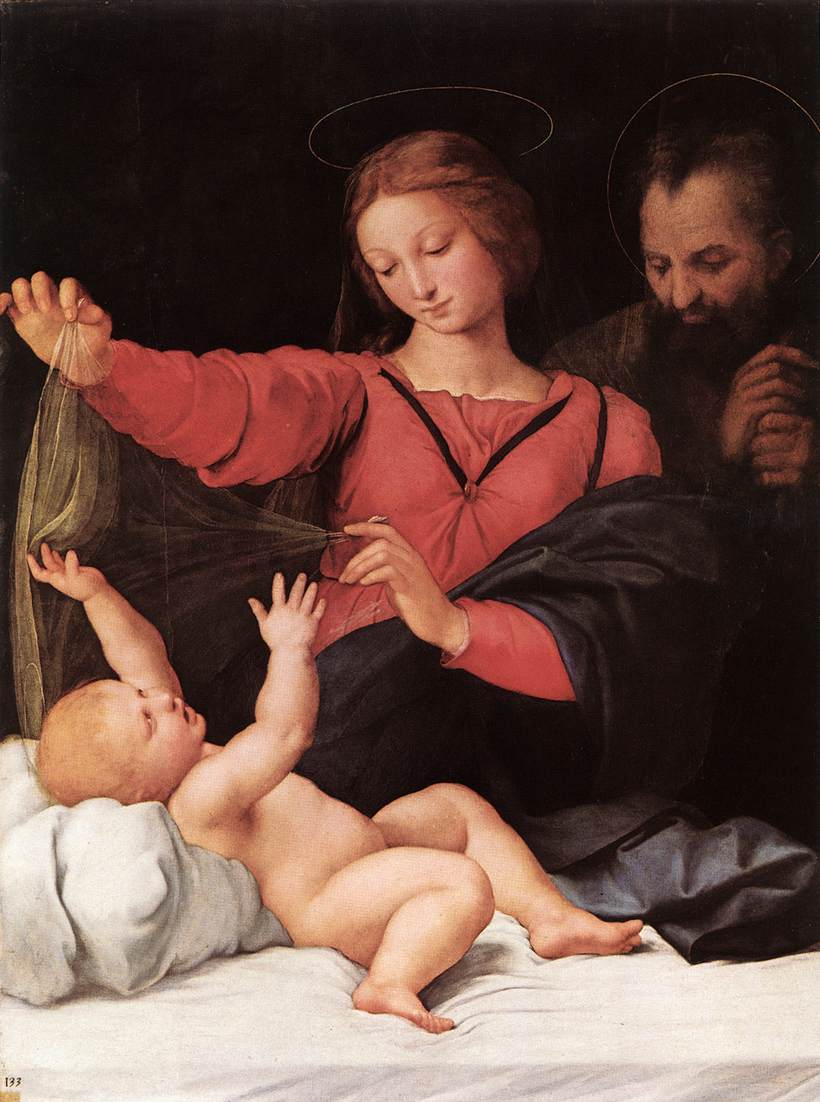
The Madonna of Loreto was displayed with the Portrait of Pope Julius II during the 16th century.

Julius II commissioned from Raphael this painting and Madonna of Loreto which resided at Santa Maria del Popolo, at the entrance gate to Rome. Upon the portrait's completion, it was exhibited in the church for eight days, where many people came to see it. According to Marino Sanuto the Younger, "it was like a jubilee, so many people went there."

An array of Renaissance artists were brought in to decorate Santa Maria del Popolo, beginning with Raphael. Both paintings by Raphael, Julius II and the Madonna were hung on pillars during feast days or high holy days.

The two paintings, nearly the same size, seem as if they were meant to complement each other. Aside from their dimensions, they also both had a strong vertical orientation. The eyes of the paintings were downcast and gave a contemplative feeling. The positioning and lighting within the paintings seems to indicate that they were meant to each flank an altar in the domed chapel. Although the paintings were paired for a time, through change of ownership the Madonna of Loreto is now located in the Musée Condé, Chantilly.

As a means of indicating Julius' appreciation of the Madonna, which resulted in the pairing of paintings, Julius commissioned the Sistine Madonna in the last year of his life where his adoration is shown by the Pope kneeling at the feet of the Virgin.

There are many rival suppositions about the circumstances surrounding the history of the painting after it was removed from Santa Maria del Popolo, partly because there were many copies of the painting and partly due to delays in publication of vital documents.

=== Cardinal Sfondrati ===
In 1591, the Raphael paintings Julius II and what was later called Madonna of Loreto were removed from the church by Paolo Camillo Sfondrati, later Cardinal Sfondrati, nephew of Pope Gregory XIV. In 1608, he sold the paintings to Cardinal Scipione Borghese.

=== Borghese collection ===
The paintings were still recorded as part of the Borghese Collection in 1693, as a small inventory number 118 at the bottom left of the London Julius shows. The discovery of this number, hidden by over-paint, in x-ray photographs in 1969 was one of the key pieces of evidence establishing the primacy of the London version. It matches a catalogue of paintings in the Palazzo Borghese in Rome in 1693. The painting presumably left the collection between 1794 and 1797, and its whereabouts are unknown until it reappeared in the Angerstein Collection in London by 1823, and so was acquired by the National Gallery in 1824, initially catalogued as a Raphael, but this attribution was soon abandoned for over a century.

== Gallery ==
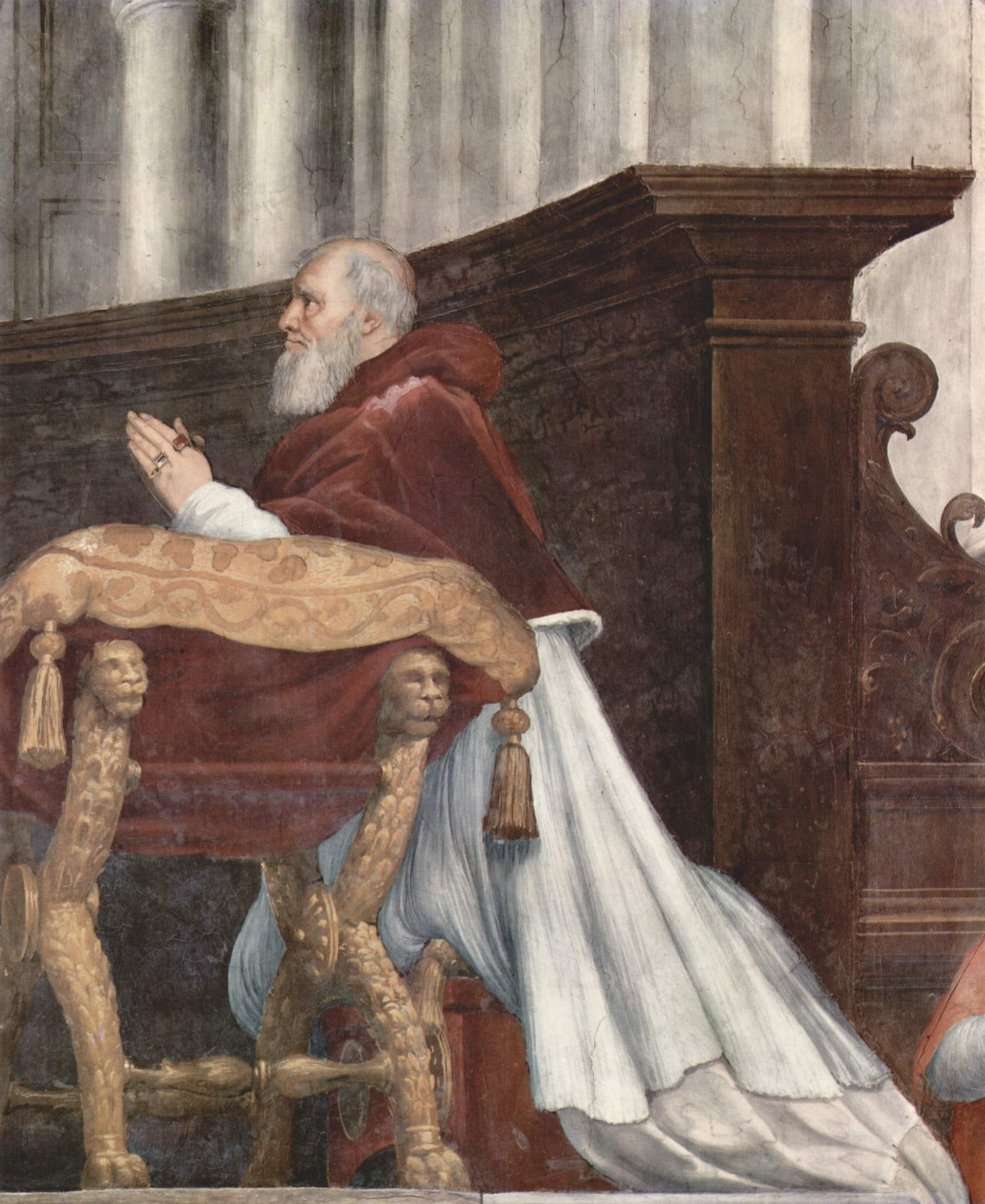
Pope Julius in The Mass at Bolsena

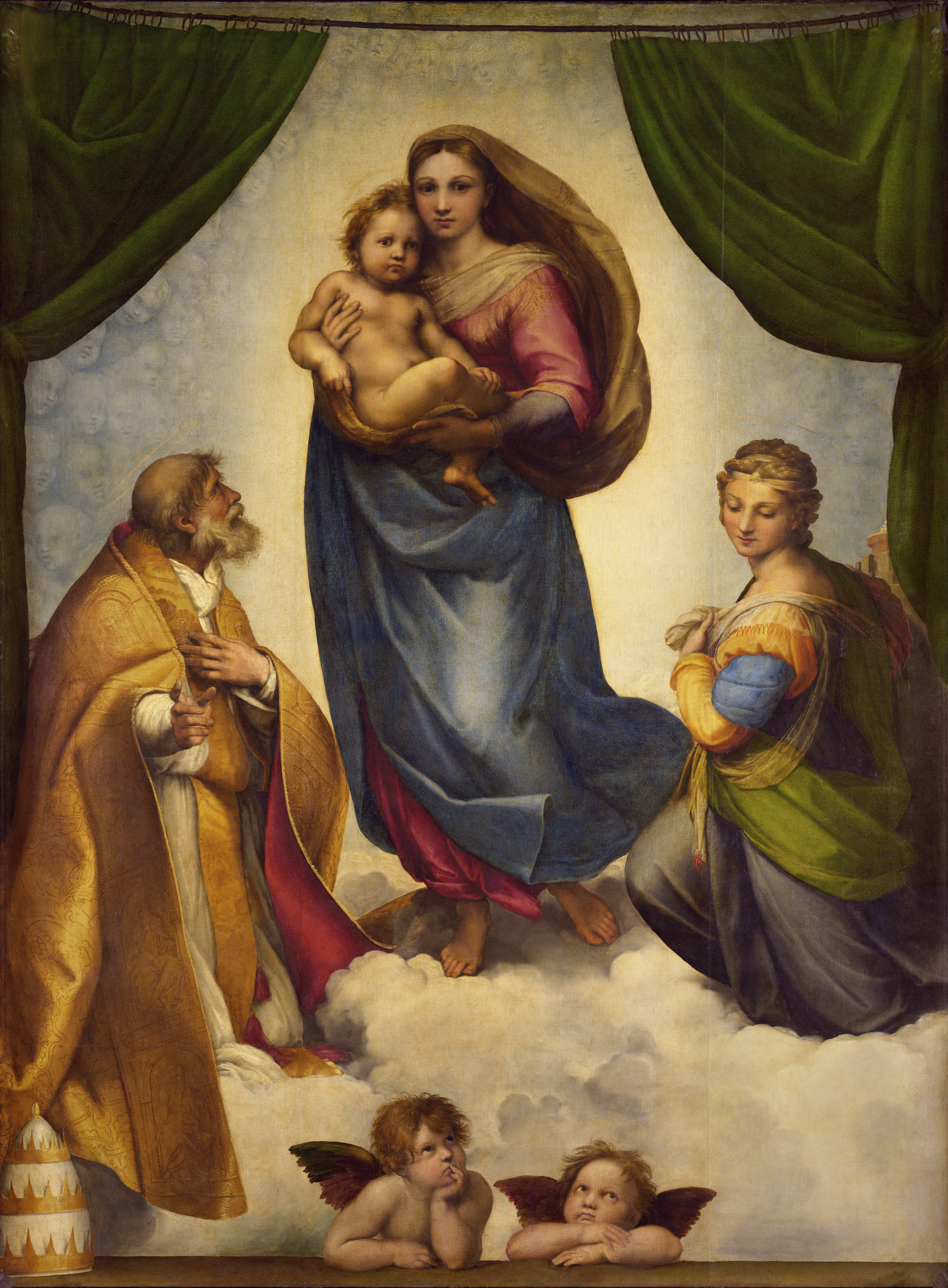
The Sistine Madonna, commissioned by Julius in the last year of his life

== See also ==
- List of paintings by Raphael
