= Pietro da Cortona =

Italian Baroque painter, architect (1596–1669)

- Self-Portrait
- Born: Pietro Berrettini; 1 November 1596 or 1597; Cortona, Grand Duchy of Tuscany
- Died: 16 May 1669 (aged 72); Rome, Papal States
- Known for: Painting and architecture
- Movement: Baroque

Pietro da Cortona (Italian: [ˈpjɛːtro da (k)korˈtoːna]; 1 November 1596 or 1597 – 16 May 1669) was an Italian Baroque painter and architect. Along with his contemporaries and rivals Gian Lorenzo Bernini and Francesco Borromini, he was one of the key figures in the emergence of Roman Baroque architecture. He was also an important designer of interior decorations.

He was born Pietro Berrettini, but is primarily known by the name of his native town of Cortona in Tuscany. He worked mainly in Rome and Florence. He is best known for his frescoed ceilings, such as the vault of the salone or main salon of the Palazzo Barberini in Rome and carried out extensive painting and decorative schemes for the Medici family in Florence and for the Oratorian fathers at the church of Santa Maria in Vallicella in Rome. He also painted numerous canvases. Only a limited number of his architectural projects were built, but nonetheless they are as distinctive and as inventive as those of his rivals.

== Biography ==
=== Early career ===
Berrettini was born into a family of artisans and masons, in Cortona, then a town in the Grand Duchy of Tuscany. He trained in painting in Florence under Andrea Commodi, but soon he departed for Rome at around 1612/3, where he joined the studio of Baccio Ciarpi. He was involved in fresco decorations at the Palazzo Mattei in 1622-3 under the direction of Agostino Ciampelli, and Cardinal Orsini had commissioned from him an Adoration of the Shepherds (c. 1626) for San Salvatore in Lauro.

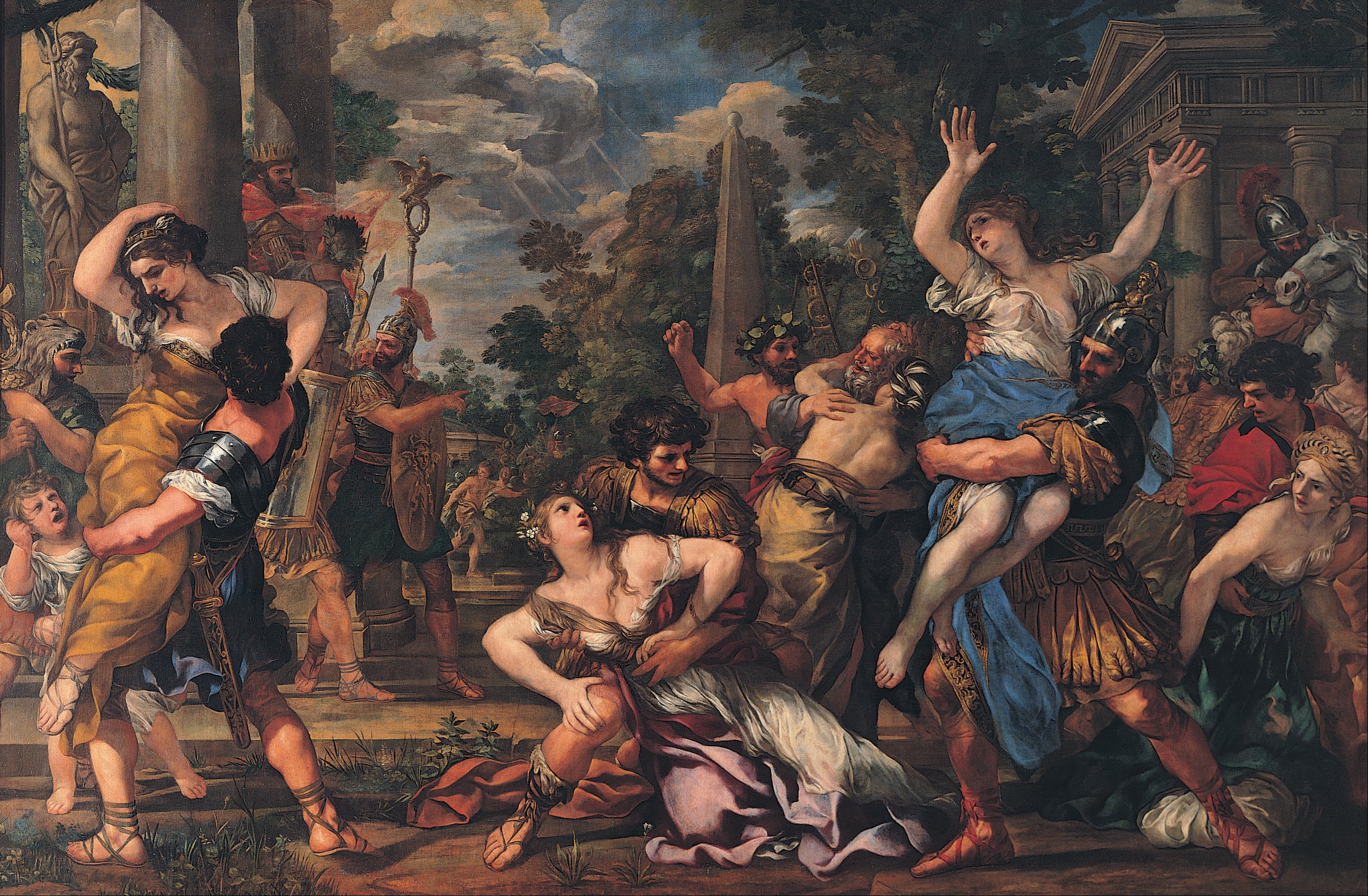
Rape of the Sabines, 1630–31

In Rome, he had encouragement from many prominent patrons. According to Cortona's biographers his gifted copy of Raphael's Galatea fresco brought him to the attention of Marcello Sacchetti, papal treasurer during the papacy of Pope Urban VIII. Such contacts helped him gain an early major commission in Rome (1624–1626), a fresco decoration in the church of Santa Bibiana that was being renovated under the direction of Bernini. In 1626, the Sacchetti family engaged Cortona to paint three large canvases of The Sacrifice of Polyxena, The Triumph of Bacchus, and The Rape of the Sabines (the latter, c. 1629), and to paint a series of frescoes in the Villa Sacchetti at Castelfusano, near Ostia, using a team that included the young Andrea Sacchi. In the Sacchetti orbit, he met Pope Urban VIII and Cardinal Francesco Barberini, the papal nephew, and their patronage of Cortona provided him with ample scope to demonstrate his abilities as a painter of frescoes and canvases.

=== Grand Salon of Palazzo Barberini ===
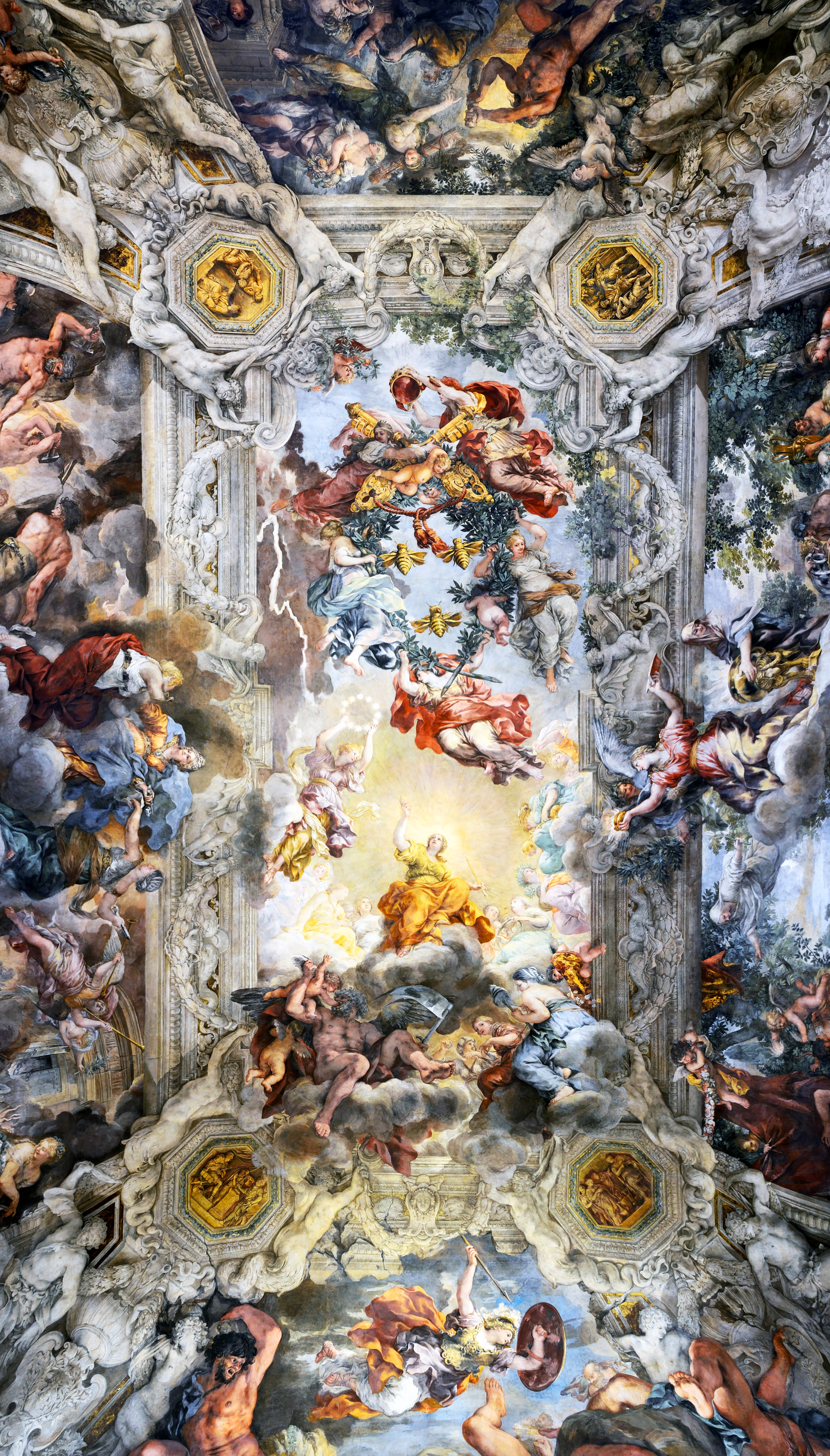
Allegory of Divine Providence and Barberini Power

Fresco cycles were numerous in Cortona's Rome; many represented "quadri riportati" or painted framed episodes imitating canvases as found in the Sistine Chapel ceiling or in Annibale Carracci's The Loves of the Gods in the Palazzo Farnese gallery (completed 1601). In 1633, Pope Urban VIII (Maffeo Barberini) commissioned from Cortona a large fresco painting for the main salon ceiling of the Barberini family palace; the Palazzo Barberini. It was completed six years later, following Cortona's influential visit to northern Italy, where he would have seen at first hand perspectival works by Paolo Veronese and the colour palette of Titian.

Cortona's huge Allegory of Divine Providence and Barberini Power marks a watershed in Baroque painting. Following the architecture of the room, he created the painted illusion of an open airy architectural framework against which figures are situated, usually seen 'al di sotto in su', apparently coming into the room itself or floating far above it. The ornamented architectural framework essentially forms five compartments. The central and most significant part celebrates the glorification of the reign of Urban VIII in a light-filled scene populated with allegorical figures and Barberini family emblems.

The illusion of spatial extension through paint, the grandiose theme and the skill of execution could astonish and impress visitors. However, Cortona's panegyric trompe-l'œil extravaganzas may be less familiar to audiences accustomed to minimalism and such like, yet they are precursors of the sunny figures and cherubim infested with rococo excesses. They contrast markedly with the darker naturalism prominent in Caravaggisti works and with the classicising compositions by painters such as Domenichino and Andrea Sacchi, and remind us that Baroque painting could be grand in an epic manner and exuberant in spirit.

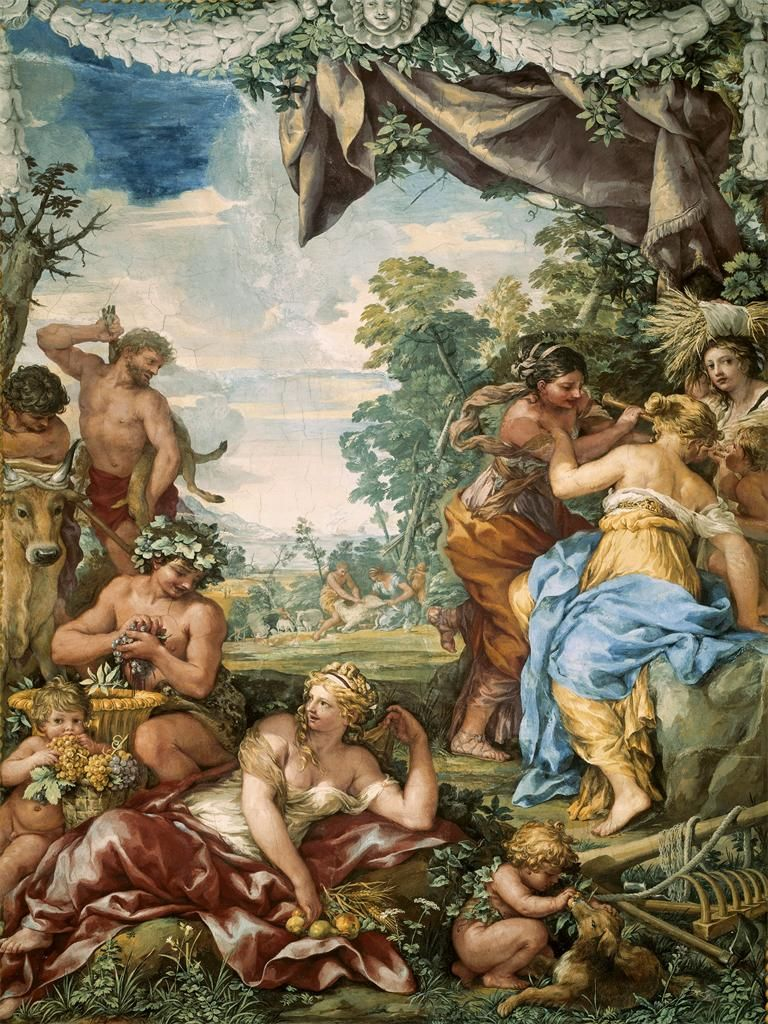
The Golden Age by Pietro da Cortona

=== Frescoes in Palazzo Pitti ===
Cortona had been patronized by the Tuscan community in Rome, hence it was not surprising when he was passing through Florence in 1637, that he should be asked by Ferdinando II de' Medici, Grand Duke of Tuscany to paint a series of frescoes intended to represent Ovid's Four Ages of Man in the small Sala della Stufa, a room in the Palazzo Pitti. The first two frescoes represented the "ages" of gold and silver. In 1641, he was recalled to paint the 'Bronze Age' and 'Iron Age' frescoes. It is said he was guided in the formulation of the allegorical designs by Michelangelo Buonarroti the Younger.

He thus began work on the decoration of the grand-ducal reception rooms on the first floor of the Palazzo Pitti, now part of the Palatine Gallery. In these five Planetary Rooms, the hierarchical sequence of the deities is based on Ptolemaic cosmology: Venus, Apollo, Mars, Jupiter (the Medici Throne room) and Saturn, but minus Mercury and the Moon, which should have come before Venus. The program for the Planetary Rooms was prepared by Francesco Rondinelli, a member of the circle of Michelangelo Buonarroti the Younger. These highly ornate ceilings with frescoes and elaborate stucco work essentially celebrate the Medici lineage and the bestowal of virtuous leadership. Pietro left Florence in 1647 to return to Rome, and his pupil and collaborator, Ciro Ferri, was left to complete the cycle by the 1660s.

=== Late works ===
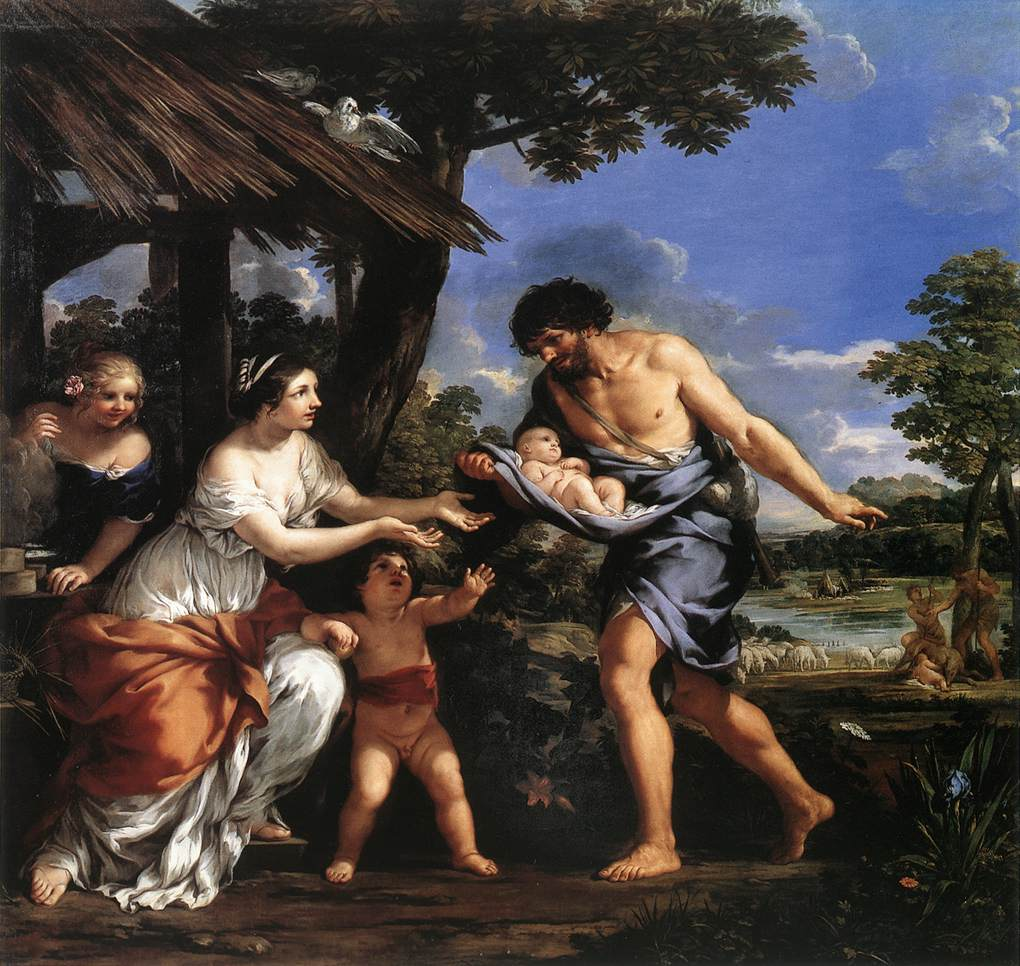
Romulus and Remus Sheltered by Faustulus, c. 1643

For a number of years, Cortona was involved for decades in the decoration of the ceiling frescoes in the Oratorian Chiesa Nuova (Santa Maria in Vallicella) in Rome, a work not finished until 1665. Other frescoes are in Palazzo Pamphilj in Piazza Navona (1651–4).

In 1660, he executed The Stoning of Saint Stephen for the church of Sant'Ambrogio della Massima in Rome. The work currently hangs in the Hermitage Museum.

Towards the end of his life, he devoted much of his time to architecture, but he published a treatise on painting in 1652 under a pseudonym and in collaboration. He refused invitations to both France and Spain.

=== Debate with Andrea Sacchi ===
He was elected as director of the Academy of St Luke, the painters' guild in Rome, in 1634. It was at the Academy in 1636 that Cortona and Andrea Sacchi were involved in theoretical controversies regarding the number of figures that were appropriate in a painted work.

Sacchi argued for a few figures, since he felt it was not possible to grant meaningful individuality, a distinct role, to more than a few figures per scene. Cortona, on the other hand, lobbied for an art that could accommodate many subplots to a central concept. He also likely viewed the possibility of using many human figures in decorative detail or to represent a general concept. Within the context of this debate, the French painter Nicolas Poussin is known to have laughed at this discussion around fixed numbers. Others have seen in this dichotomy the long-standing debate whether visual art is about theoretical principles and meant to narrate a full story, or a painterly decorative endeavour, meant to delight the senses. Cortona was a director of the Accademia from 1634 to 1638.

Cortona also contributed to a treatise in Florence along with the theologian and Jesuit Giandomenico Ottonelli titled: Trattato della pittura e scultura, uso et abuso loro: composto da un theologo e da un pittore (Stamperia, Giovanni Antonio Bonardi, Florence, 1652). Authorship in subsequent editions is attributed to Cortona.

=== Pupils ===
Cortona employed or trained many prominent artists, who then disseminated his grand manner style. Apart from Ciro Ferri, others who worked in his studio included:

Painter	Dates	Birthplace	Source
			(H)
Carlo Ascenzi	17th century	Rome, Gennazano	Other
Lazzaro Baldi	1623–1703	Pistoia, moved to Rome	(H)(W)
Marcantonio Bellavia	17th century		
Francesco Bonifazio			(H)(W)
Lorenzo Berrettini (Cortona's nephew)		Florence	(W)
Giovanni Ventura Borghesi	1640–1708	Rome	(H)(W)
Giovanni Maria Bottala	1613-	Naples	(H)
Andrea Camassei	1602–1649	Bevagna, moved to Rome	(W)
Salvi Castellucci	1608–1672	Florence	(H)(W)
Carlo Cesio	1626–1686		(H)(W)
Giovanni Coli	?-1681		(H)(W)
Guglielmo Cortese (Il Borgognone)			(H)(W)
Vincenzo Dandini	1607-	Florence	(W)(W)
Nicholas Duval	1644-	The Hague	(H)
Onofrio Gabrielli	1616–1706	Messina	(H)
Camillo Gabrielli			(W)
Giacinto Gimignani	1611–1681	Pistoia, moved to Rome	(H)(W)
Filippo Gherardi	1643–1701		(H)(W)
Paolo Gismondi	1612–1685	Perugia	(H)(W)
Luca Giordano	1632	Naples	(H)
Giovanni Battista Langetti	1635–1676	Genoa	(H)
Pietro Lucatelli			(W)
Giovanni Marracci	1637–1704	Lucca	(H)(W)
Livio Mehus (Lieven Mehus)	1630–1691	(Active Florence)	(H)(W)
Giovanni Battista Natali	1630–1700		(H)
Adriano Palladino	1610–1680	Cortona	(MB)
Bartolomeo Palommo	1612-	Rome	(H)
Pio Paolino	? -1681	Udine	(H)
Rodomonte di Pasquino Pieri	Active circa 1680	Vellano	
Giovanni Quagliata	1603–1673	Messina	
Giovanni Francesco Romanelli	1617–1662		(H)(W)
Pietro Paolo Baldini	(13)		(H)(W)
Raffaello Vanni			(W)
Adriano Zabarelli			(W)

Romanelli and Camassei also trained under Domenichino. Giovanni Maria Bottala was one of his assistants on the Barberini Ceiling. Sources for (W); while sources for (H). Source for MB is Dictionary of Painters and Engravers, Biographical and Critical (Volume II L-Z).

=== Architectural projects ===
Among Cortona's more important architectural projects are the church of Santi Luca e Martina (completed in 1664), and the church of the Accademia di San Luca, located in the Roman Forum. While Cortona was principe or director of the Accademia from 1634–38, he obtained permission to dig in the crypt of the church, which led to the likely mistaken finding of remains attributed to the first-century Roman martyr and Saint Martina. This discovery led to further patronage for the construction of the church. The layout is almost a Greek cross, with four nearly identical wings extending from the striking central dome. Much of the ground structure is undecorated, and above is intricately decorated. The overwhelmingly vertical decoration of the façade is granted liveliness by horizontal convexity. In his will, this bachelor called this church his beloved daughter.

He also renovated the exterior renewal of the ancient Santa Maria della Pace (1656–1667), and the façade (with an unusual loggia) of Santa Maria in Via Lata (appr. 1660).

Another influential work for its day was the design and decoration of the Villa Pigneto commissioned by the Marchese Sacchetti. This garden palace or casino gathered a variety of features in a novel fashion, including a garden facade with convex arms, and highly decorated niches, and elaborate tiered staircases surrounding a fountain.

=== Anatomical plates ===
Before becoming famous as an architect, Pietro drew anatomical plates that would not be engraved and published until a hundred years after his death. The plates in Tabulae anatomicae are now thought to have been started around 1618. The dramatic and highly studied poses effected by the figures are in keeping with the style of other Renaissance Baroque anatomical artists, although nowhere does such an approach find any fuller expression than in these plates.

== Gallery ==
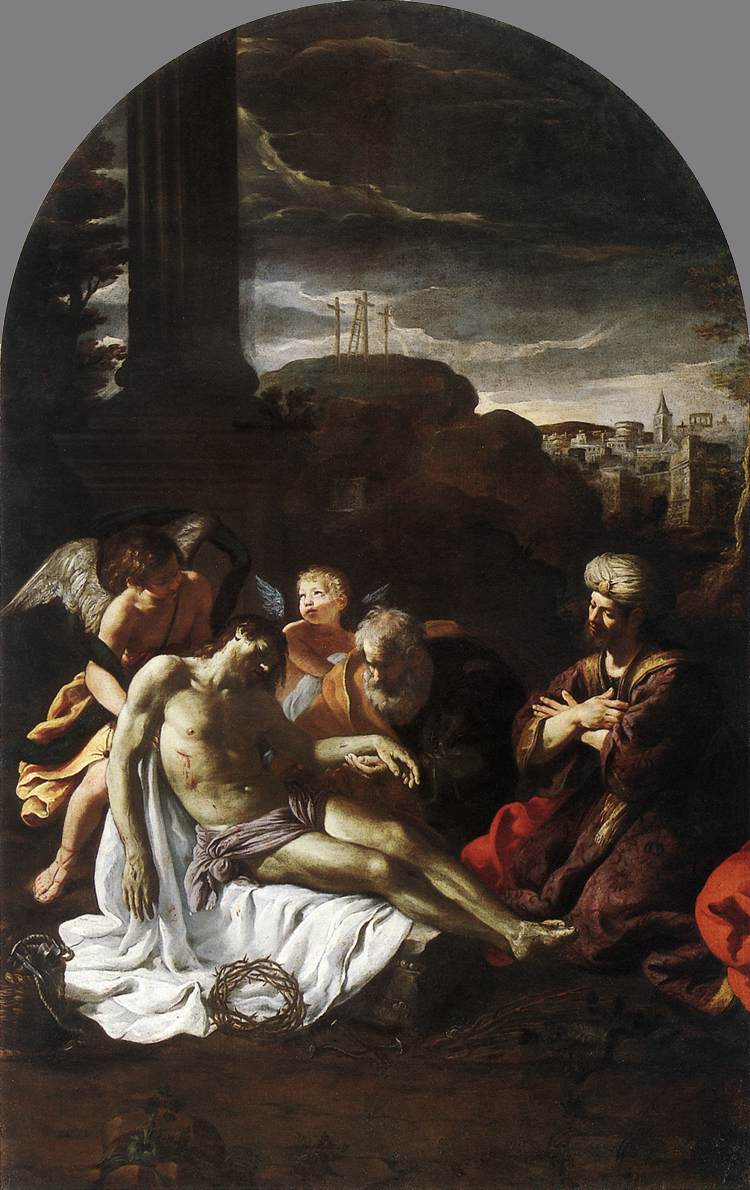
Pietà

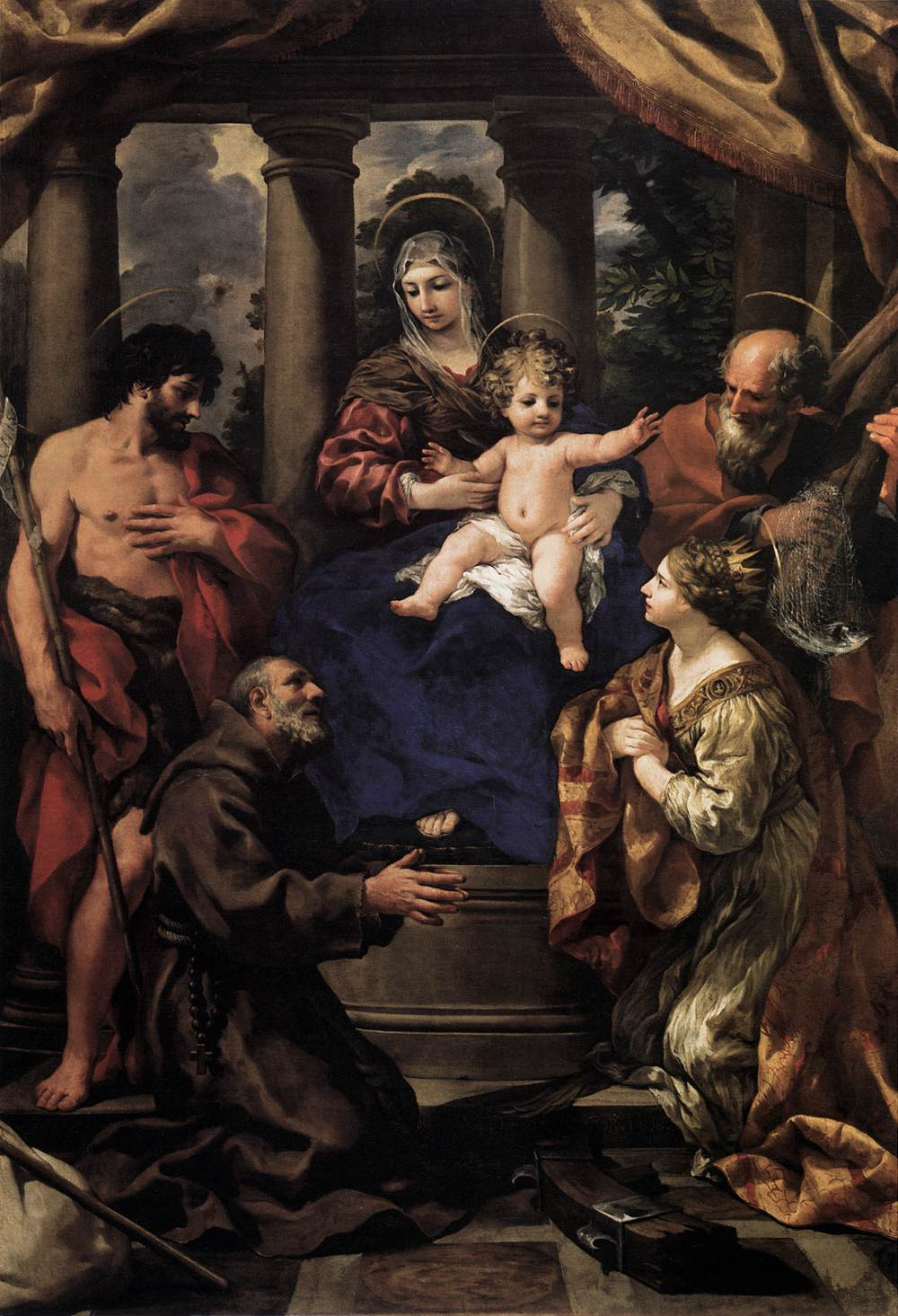
Virgin and Child with Saints

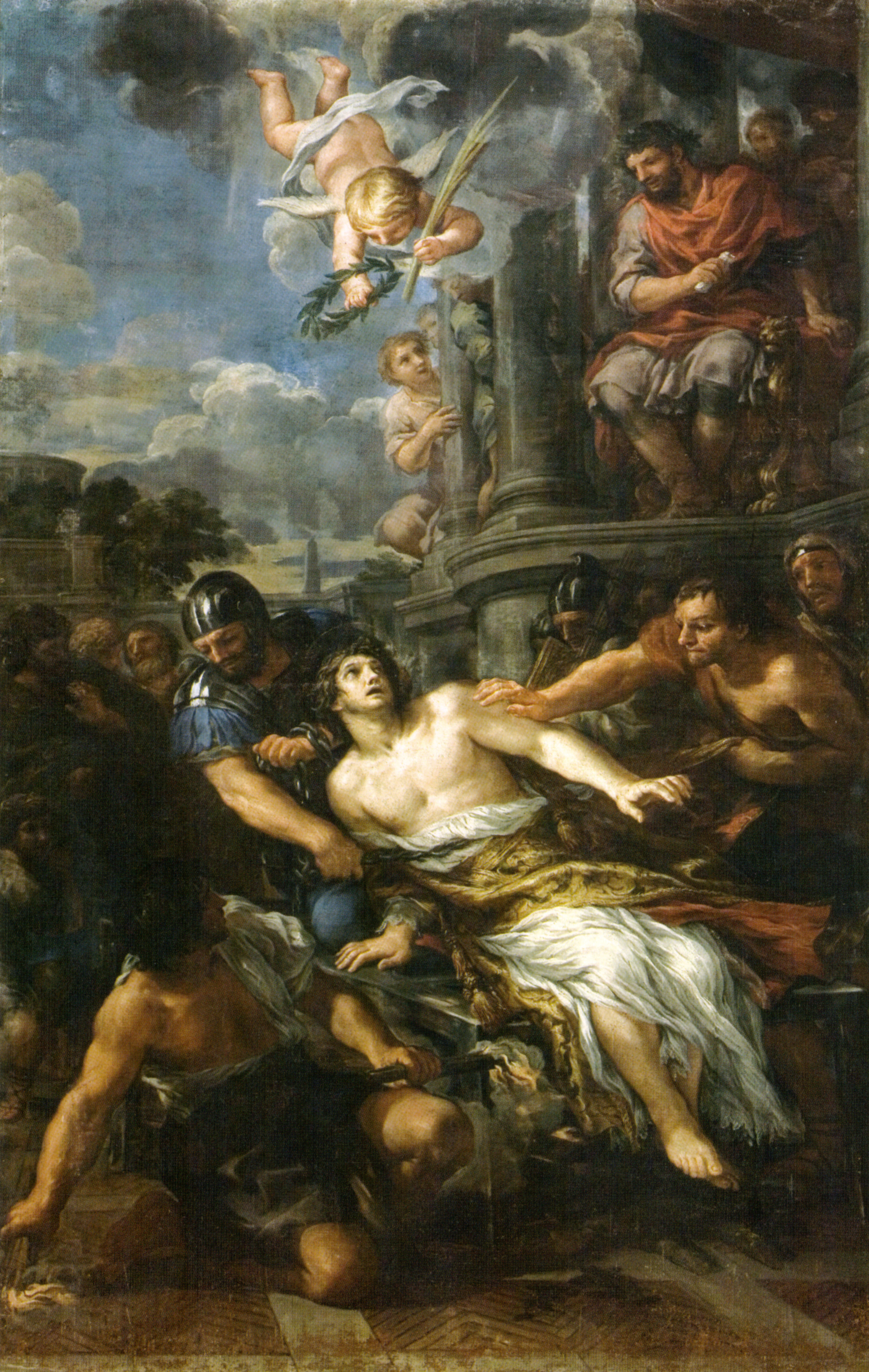
Martyrdom of St Lawrence

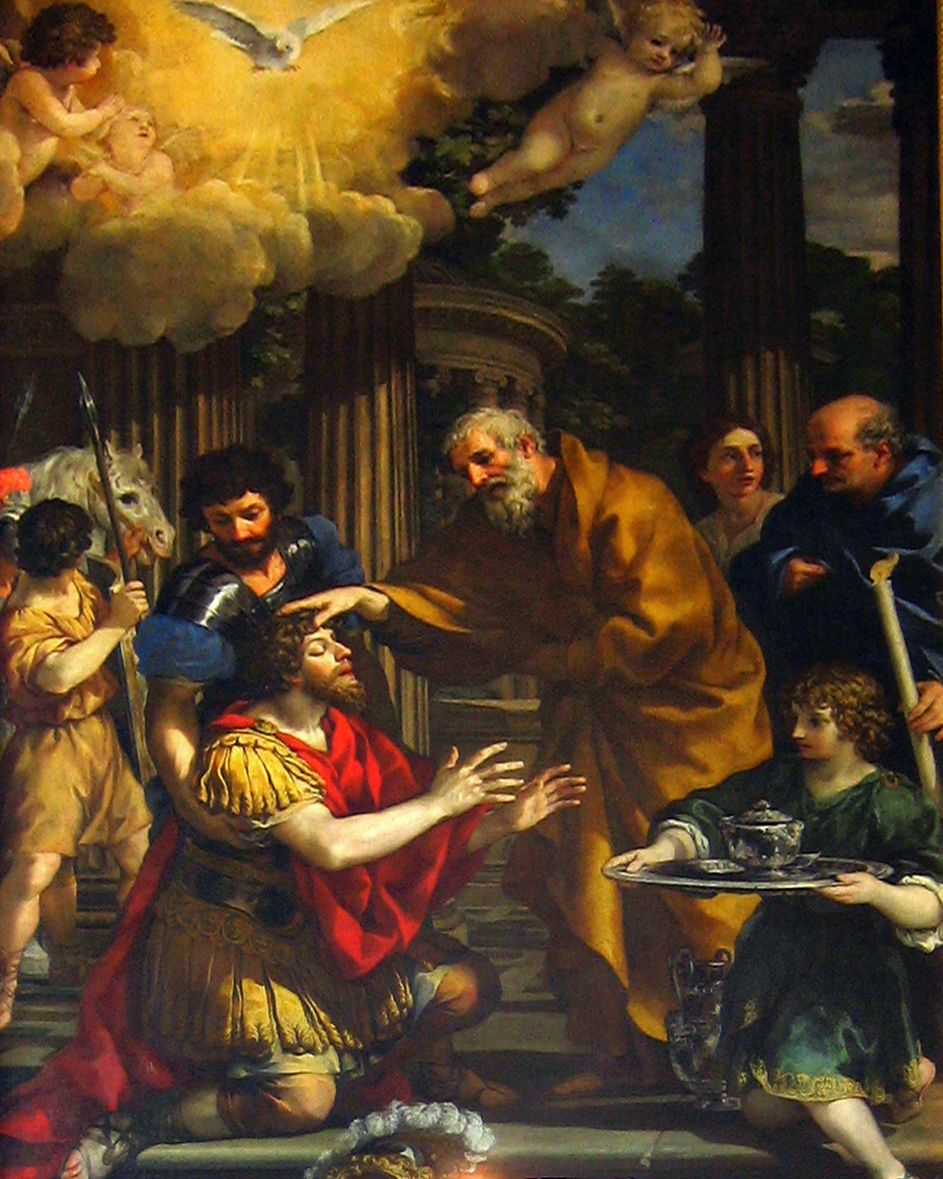
Ananias restores sight to St Paul

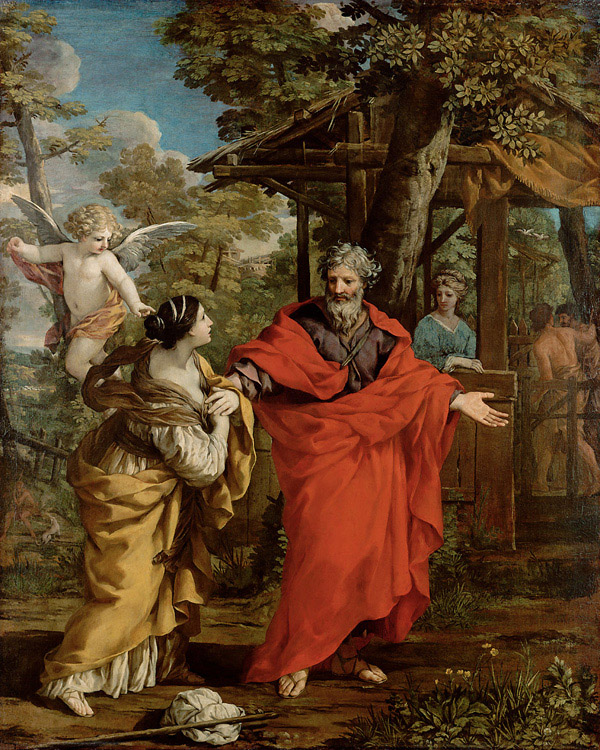
Return of Hagar

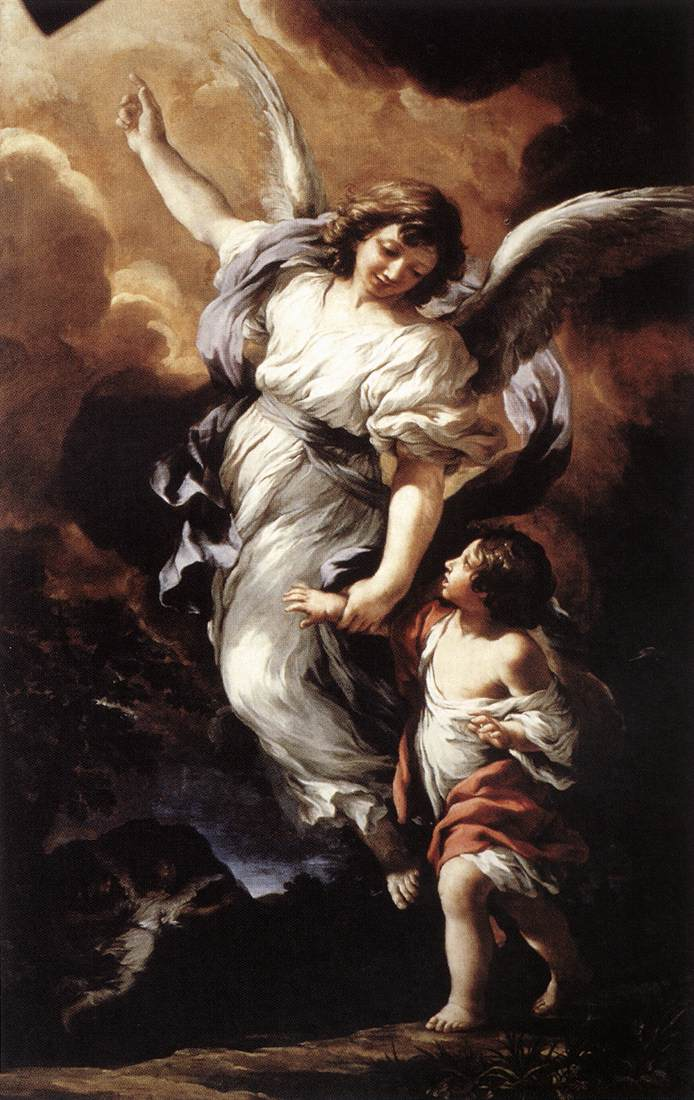
Guardian Angel

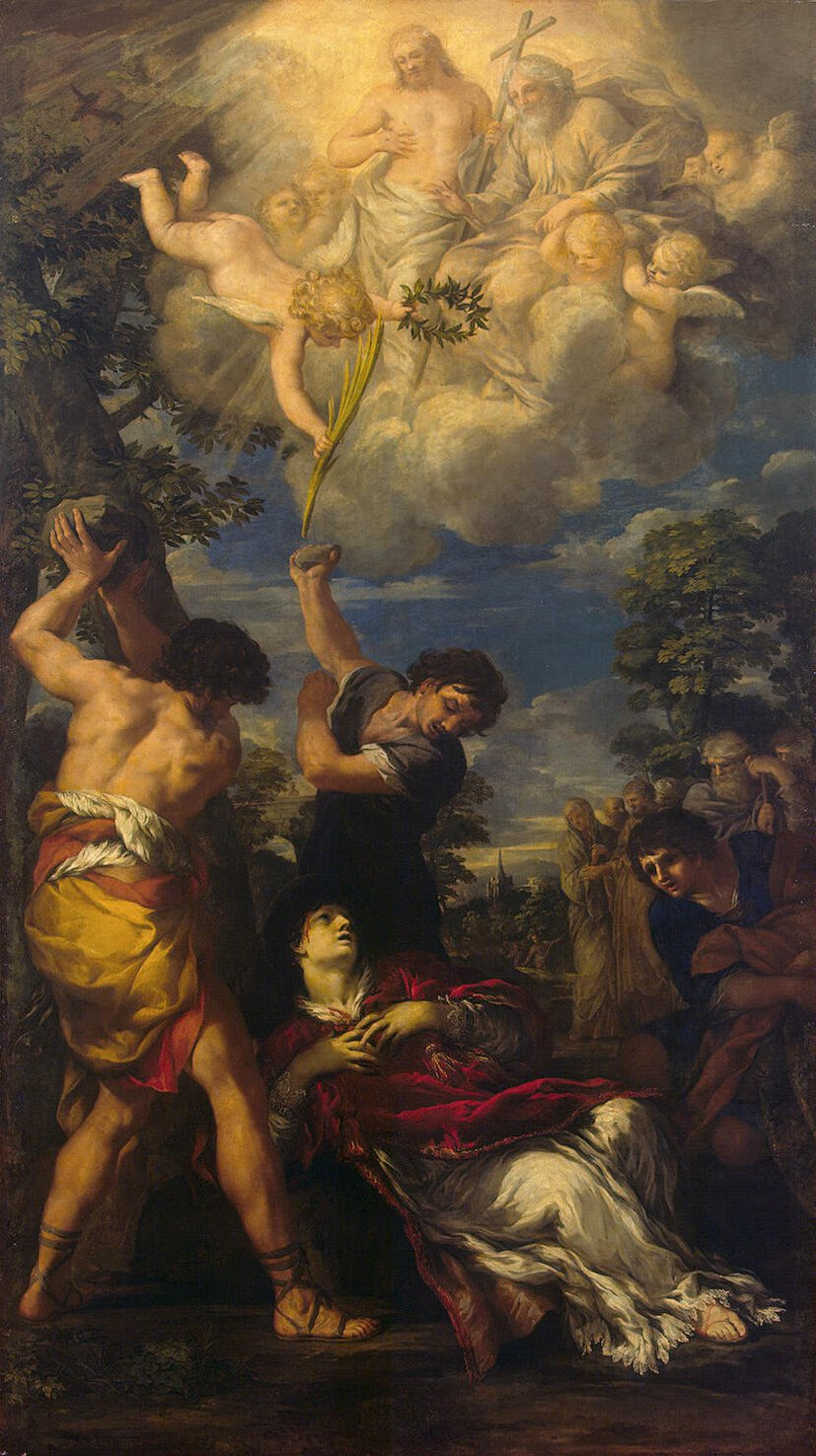
Stoning of St Stephen

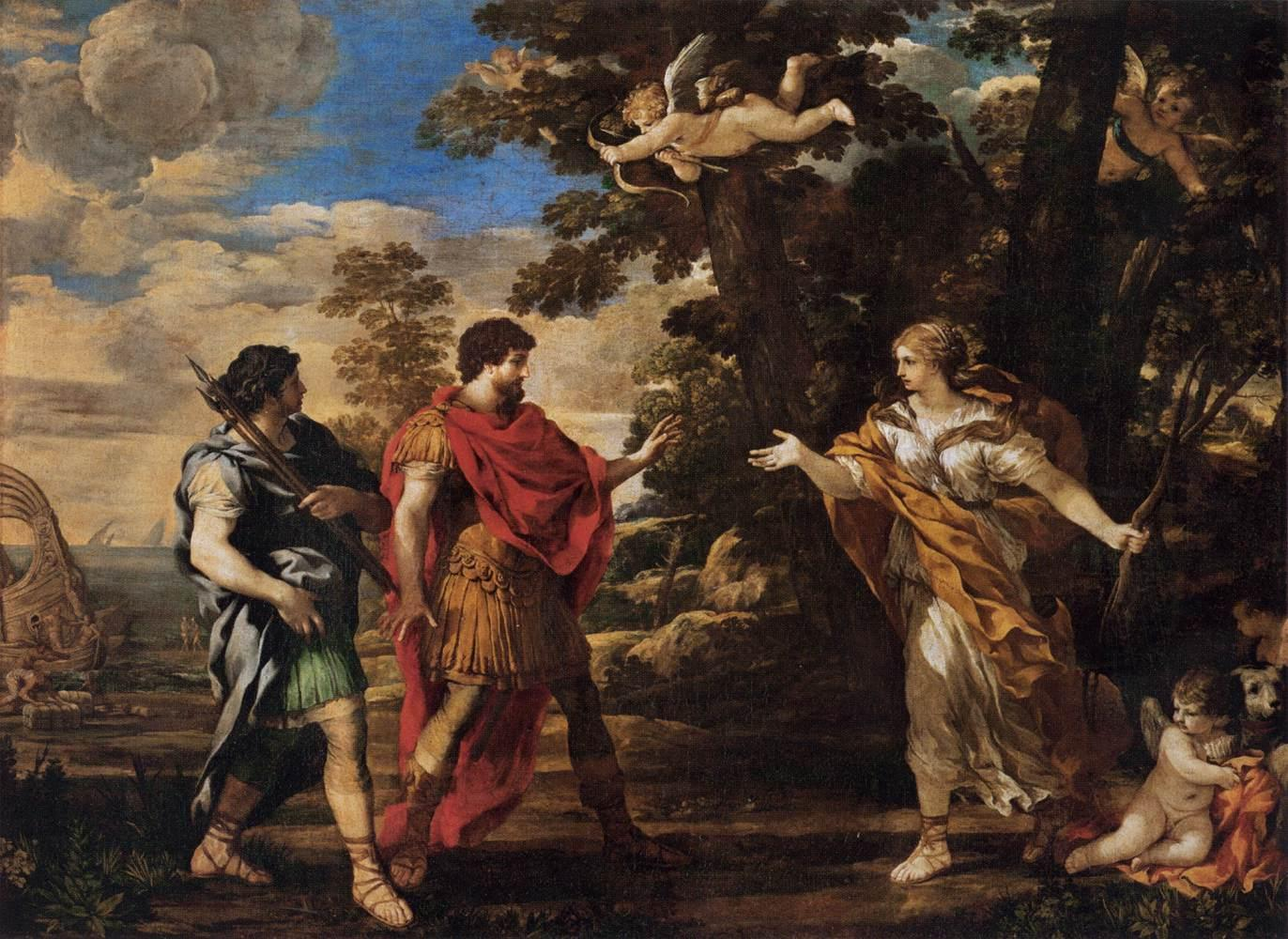
Venus as Huntress Appears to Aeneas

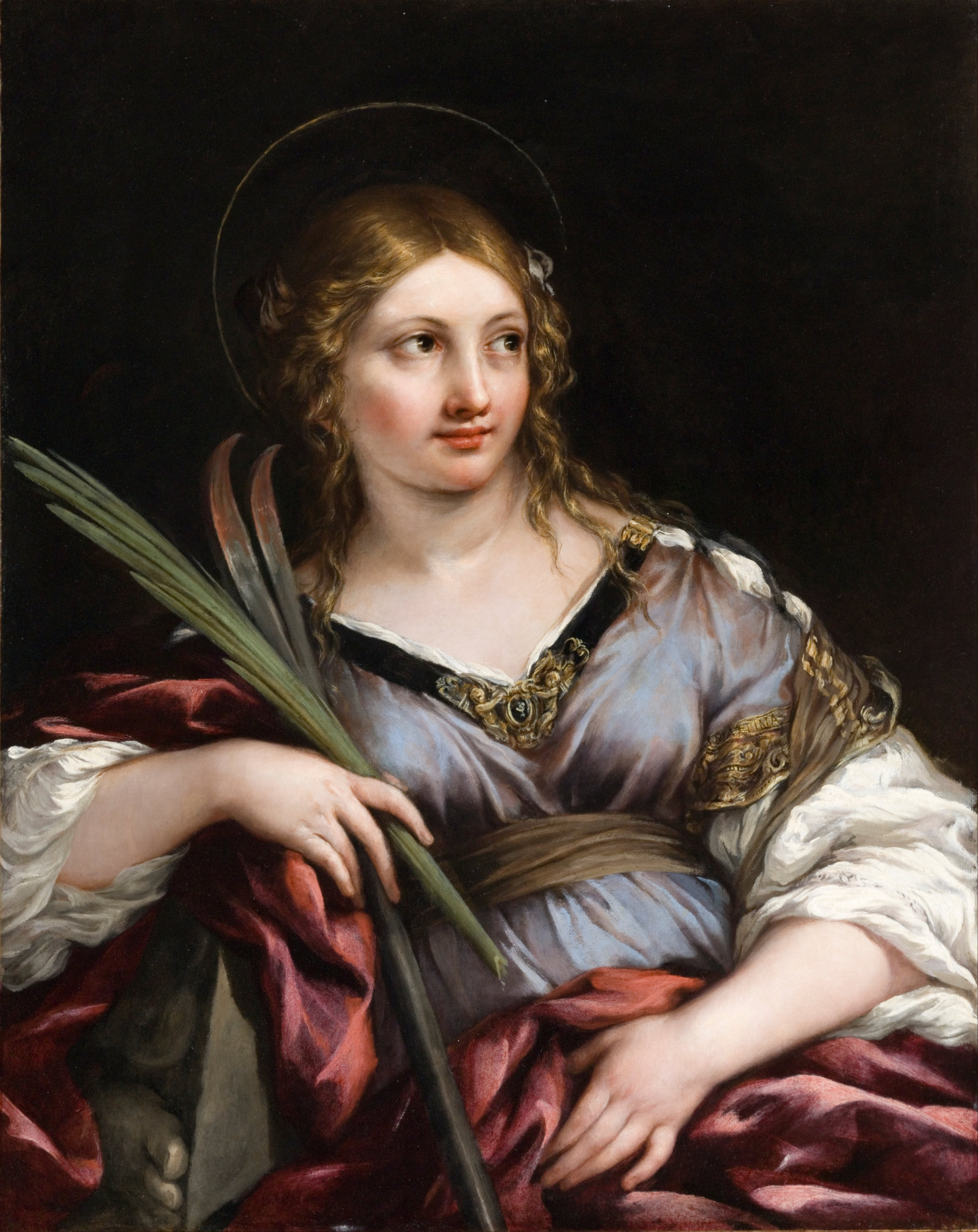
St. Martina

== Sources ==
- Connors, Joseph (1982). "Cortona, Pietro Berrettini da" Placzek 1982; vol. 1, pp. 455–466.
- Connors, Joseph (1998). "Pietro da Cortona 1597–1669". The Journal of the Society of Architectural Historians. 57 (3): 318–321. doi:10.2307/991350. JSTOR 991350.
- Haskell, Francis (1980). Patrons and Painters; Art and Society in Baroque Italy. Yale University Press. pp. 38–40, 60–62. ISBN 9780064300094.
- Loire, Stéphane (1998). "Pietro da Cortona". The Burlington Magazine. 140 (1140): 219–222. JSTOR 887849.
- Merz, Jörg Martin (2008). Pietro da Cortona and Roman Baroque Architecture. New Haven; London: Yale University Press. ISBN 9780300111231.
- Placzek, Adolf K., editor (1982). Macmillan Encyclopedia of Architects. London: Macmillan. ISBN 9780029250006.
- Rendina, Claudio (2000). Enciclopedia di Roma. Rome: Newton Compton.
