= Marcantonio Bellavia =

Italian painter

Marcantonio Bellavia (fl. 1670) was a Sicilian painter and etcher active in Sicily and Rome. He moved to Rome to work under Pietro da Cortona in ca. 1668. Several of his works were later erroneously attributed to Carracci.

== Life ==
Sicilian, both the place and date of birth are not known. It is known that he was in Rome between the year 1668 and 1670, where he performed the work of painter and engraver. The news about his life came down to us through a documented controversy that arose between him and the painter Girolamo Troppa, whose assistant and collaborator he had been a long time. Remembered as a painter and follower of Pietro da Cortona (Orlandi, Lanzi), he left evidence of his activity in the chapel De Angelis in S. Maria in Aracoeli (frescoes of the vault with the Gloria of St. Peter of Alcantara and of the pediments with figures of angels) and in the first small chapel to the right of the baptismal font in St. Andrea delle Fratte (painting of the right wall with an Annunciation).

His engraving were published after the artist's death by unscrupulous merchants who presented these prints as works by Annibale Carracci.

At the beginning of the 18th century, Vincenzo Belli published 60 Bellavia's incisions with the indication: Various works by Annibale Carracci. They were printed by Vincenzo Bellii in Rome at the Orologio alla Chiesa Nova. But their belonging to Bellavia is unequivocally proven by the appearance in many incisions of his monogram ("MAB" and "MABI") and in a - 39th - even of the inscription: "Marcus Antonius, Bellavia in. Et pr. Rome ". Later Venanzio Monaldini republished 38 Bellavia's incisions., collecting them in a book entitled: Different Thoughts etched and carved by Anibale Caracci.
