= Madonna of Loreto =

Painting by Raphael

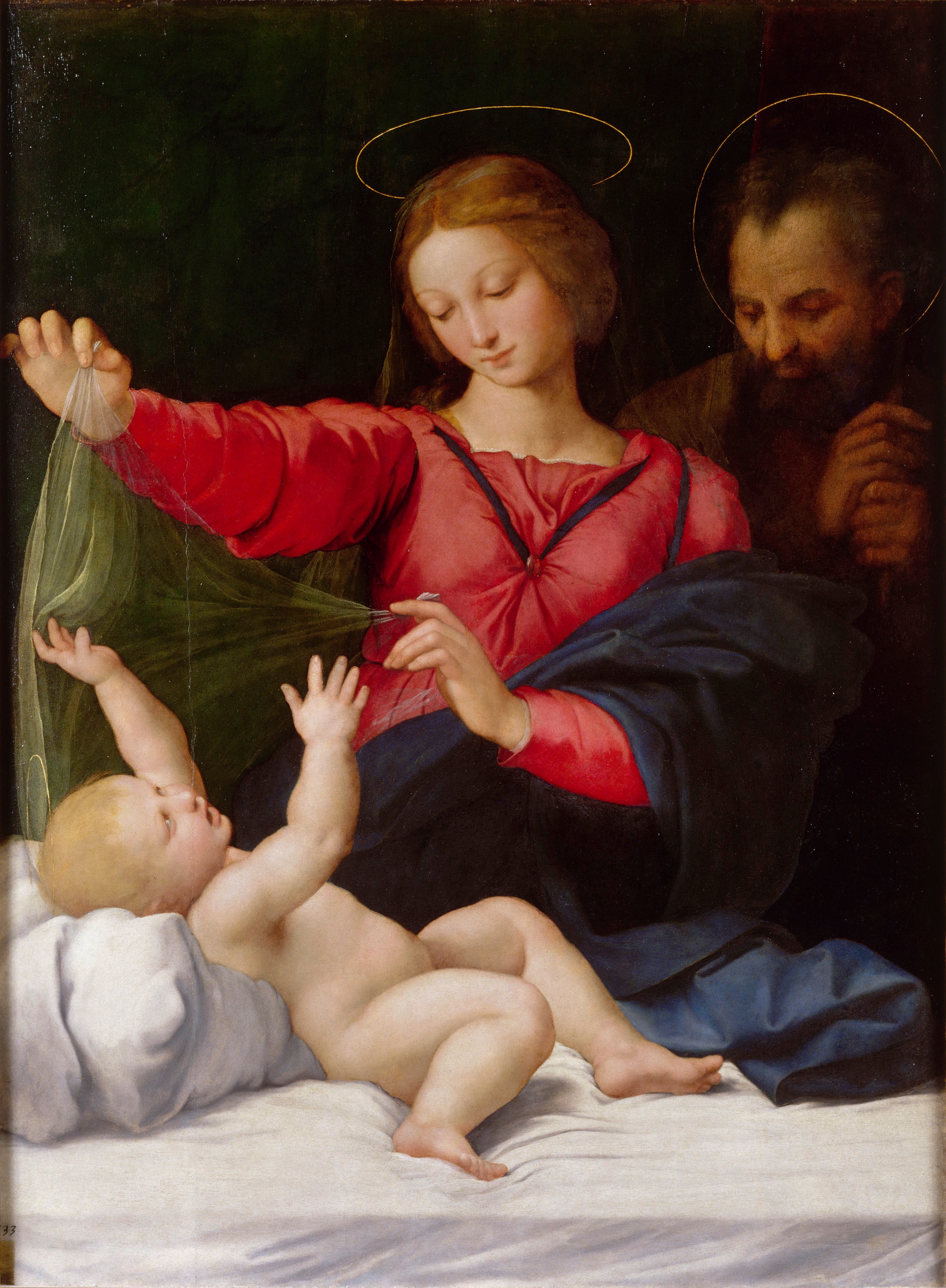
- Artist: Raphael
- Year: c. 1511
- Type: Oil on panel
- Dimensions: 120 cm × 90 cm (47 in × 35 in)
- Location: Musée Condé, Chantilly

The Madonna of Loreto is an oil on panel painting by the Italian High Renaissance painter Raphael, executed c. 1511. It is housed in the Musée Condé in the Château de Chantilly, France.

For centuries the painting kept company with Raphael's Portrait of Pope Julius II, first at the Church of Santa Maria del Popolo, then in private collections, and for a time their location was unknown. Their ownership, or provenance, has been difficult to unravel because of the number of copies of both paintings, the unclear ownership chain,and misinformation and delay of publication of vital information.

For instance, this painting received its name from a copy at the Basilica della Santa Casa in Loreto which was at one time thought to be the original. Now it is certain that the painting at Loreto was a copy – and therefore the painting name is a misnomer.

== Description ==
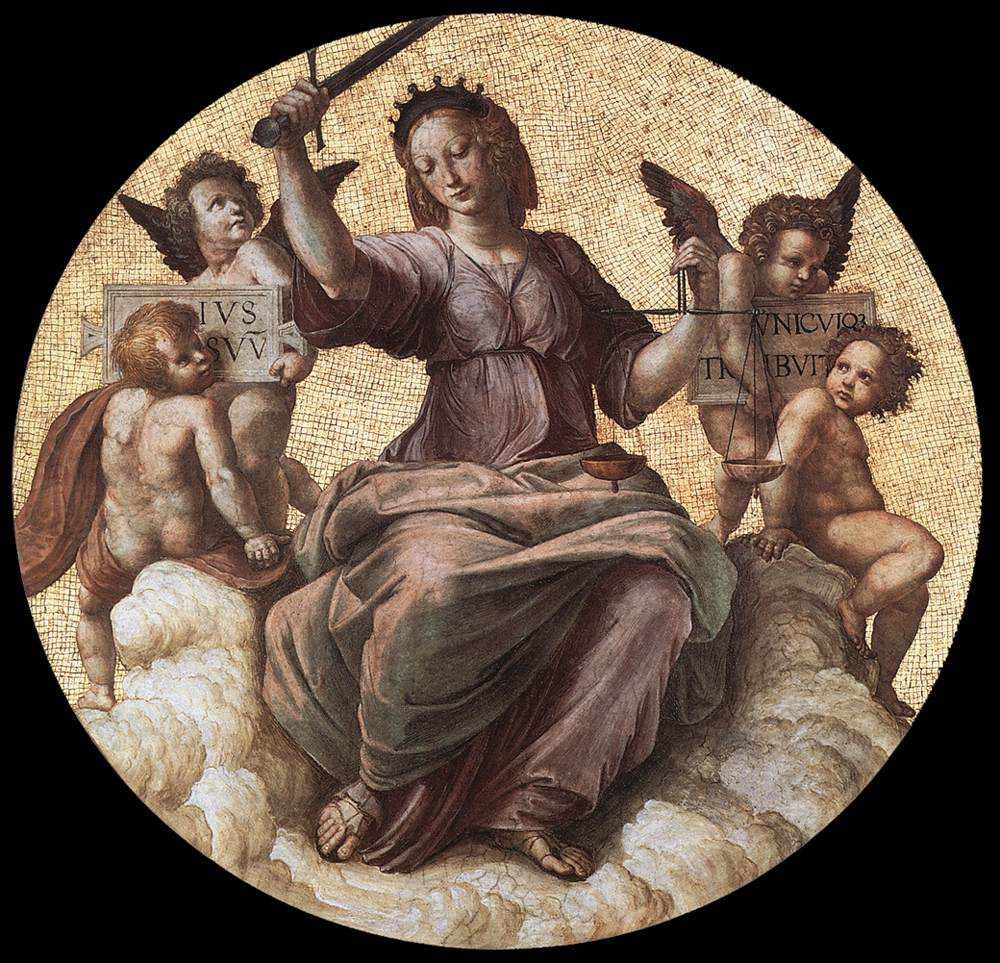
Justice, Stanza della Segnatura, Raphael's Rooms, Vatican Palace, similar in dress, frame and angle of the head to Madonna of Loreto

The painting is tender and intimate. The Child, just awakened, plays a game with the Madonna's veil, with a melancholy Saint Joseph looking on from the shadows.

The use of veil in Renaissance paintings, from the Meditations on the Life of Christ, symbolizes the manner in which the Madonna wrapped the Child in the veil from her head at the Nativity and, prophetically, again at the Crucifixion.

Saint Joseph's melancholy nature in this picture may signal his proclivity for prophecy and the coming events for the Child. Saint Joseph seemed to be an after-thought, x-rays of the painting show that Saint Joseph was painted over a window previously over the Madonna's shoulder. Further, the change in the position of the Child's right foot was revealed via x-ray. These changes align with Raphael's preliminary drawings for the painting.

The Madonna's dress, frame and angle of her head are reminiscent of Justice in the Stanza della Segnatura which was painted about the same time as this painting. It is also reminiscent of the Madonna of the Blue Diadem.

== Names ==
The history of the painting is difficult to track for many reasons, one of them being the various names for the painting, which tell the history, or the perceived history, of the original Raphael painting. This work is one of the most copied works of Raphael with over one hundred known copies.

- During the time at Santa Maria del Popolo, it was known as the Madonna del Popolo, or described as the Holy Family.
- It is sometimes called Madonna del Velo or Madonna of the Veil but not consistently and those names has also been used for the similar painting, the Madonna with the Blue Diadem.
- It is most frequently called Madonna of Loreto or Madonna di Loreto, but that name is erroneous because the original painting was not at Loreto.
- In Chantilly, the painting is called La Madona de Lorette, French for the Madonna of Loreto.

== Provenance ==
The provenance of this painting is constructed based on documents, analysis of the painting and preliminary sketches. For centuries the painting was co-located with the Portrait of Pope Julius II, first at the Santa Maria del Popolo, then in private collections, and for a time their location was unknown. The original painting by Raphael is now believed to be the version at Musée Condé in Chantilly, France.

=== Santa Maria del Popolo ===
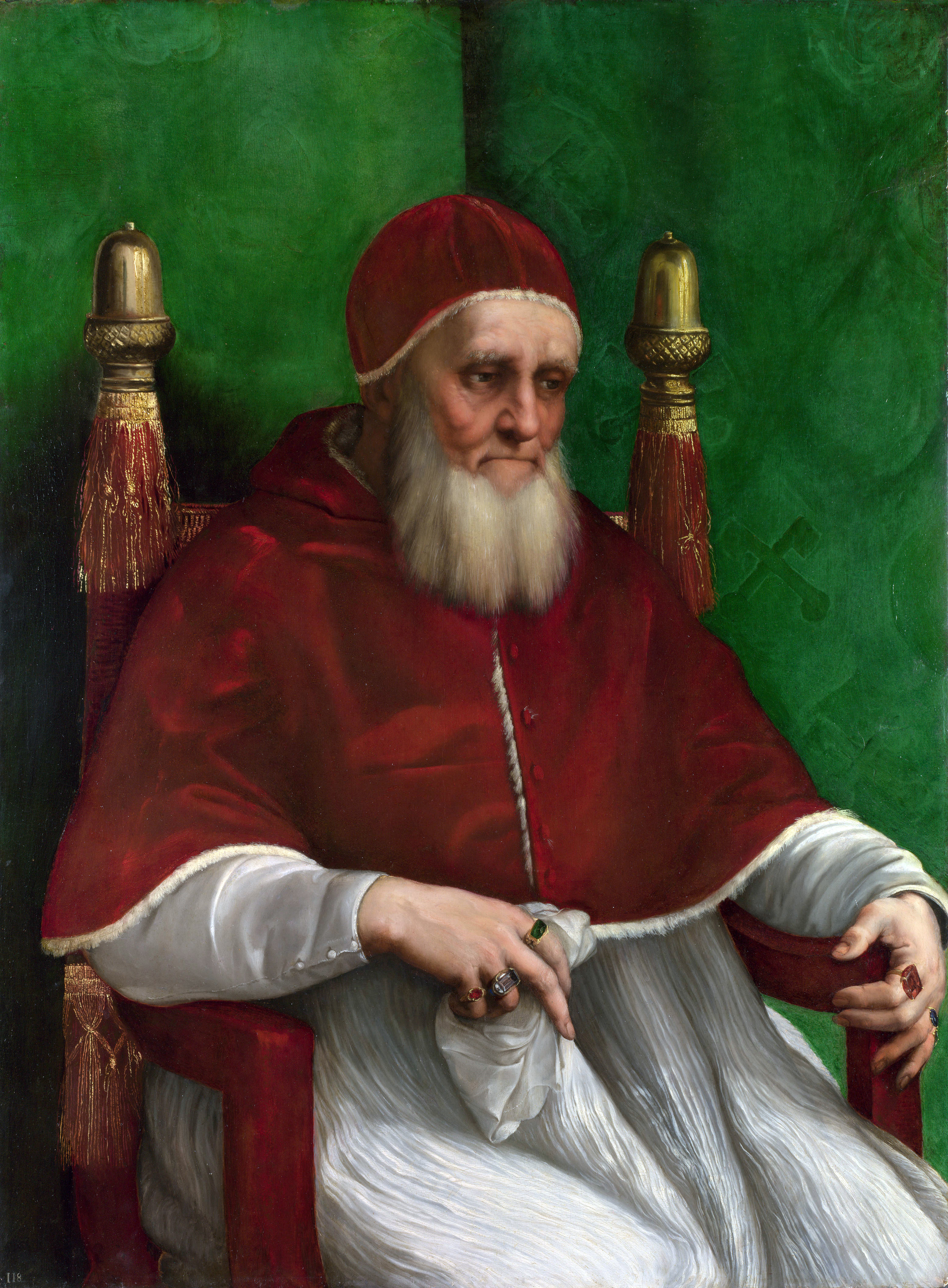
Portrait of Pope Julius II, paired with the Madonna of Loreto for centuries.

Julius II commissioned from Raphael the Madonna of the Veil and his likeness, the Portrait of Pope Julius II which resided at Santa Maria del Popolo, at the entrance gate to Rome. During this time the painting was also known as Madonna del Popolo or described as The Holy Family.

An array of Renaissance artists were brought in to decorate the Santa Maria del Popolo church and its chapels in Rome, beginning with Raphael. Both paintings by Raphael, Julius II and the Madonna were hung on pillars during feast days or high holy days.

The two paintings, nearly the same size, seem as if they were meant to complement each other. Nearly the same size, they also both had a strong vertical orientation. The eyes of the paintings were downcast and gave a contemplative feeling. The positioning and lighting within the paintings seems to indicate that they were meant to each flank a side of an altar in the domed chapel. Although the paintings were paired for a time through change of ownership, Julius II is now located in the National Gallery.

As a means of indicating Julius' appreciation of the Madonna, which resulted in the pairing of paintings, Julius commissioned another Madonna painting, the Sistine Madonna, in the last year of his life where his adoration is shown by the Pope kneeling at the feet of the Virgin.

There are many suppositions about the circumstances surrounding the Madonna painting after Popolo, partly because there were many copies of the painting and partly due to delays in publication of vital documents.

=== Cardinal Sfondrati ===
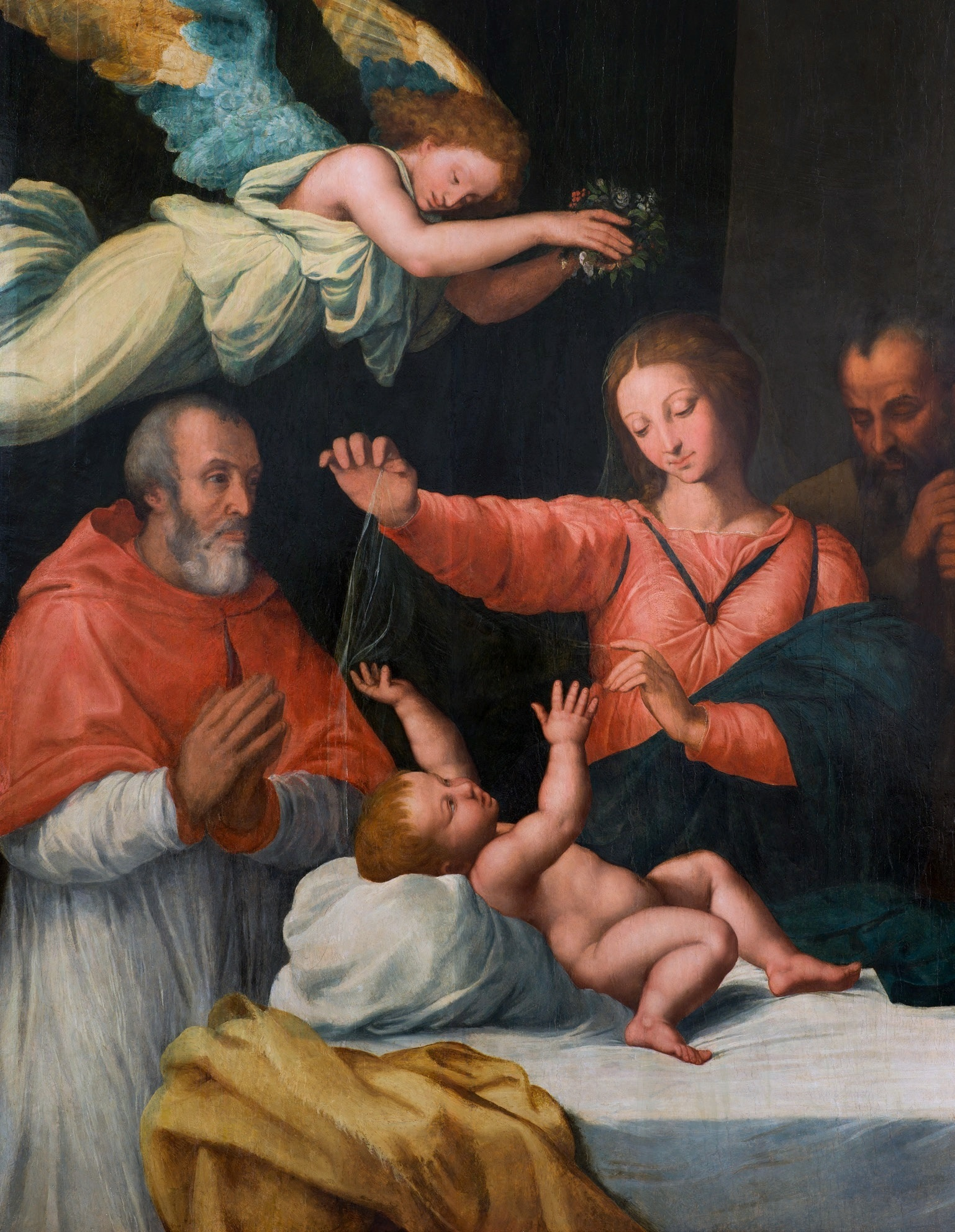
Madonna del Velo with Cardinal Paolo Emilio Sfondrati, c. 1591 (Wilanów Palace in Warsaw).

In 1591, Raphael's Portrait of Julius II and what was later called Madonna of Loreto were removed from the church by Paolo Camillo Sfondrati, later Cardinal Sfondrati, and nephew of Pope Gregory XIV. In 1608, he sold the paintings to Cardinal Scipione Borghese.

=== Borghese Collection ===
The paintings, purchased in 1608 were still recorded as part of the Borghese Collection in 1693.

=== Musée Condé at Chantilly, France ===
The painting now residing in Chantilly, France, thought lost since the time of the French Revolution (1789–1799), is believed to be the original.

In October 1979, the Musée Condé held an exhibit titled La Madona de Lorette to present and document the newly cleaned and version of the painting, which was found to be the original Raphael painting. The exhibit was held at the request of the Institut de France, administrator of Musée Condé, and organized by the Louvre museum.

Until 1979, the painting at Musée Condé had been attributed to Gianfrancesco Penni.

The painting was determined to be the original Raphael Madonna painting for several reasons. First, the quality of the painting is extremely high, depicting an "admirable equilibrium of motives and a subtle mixture of force and grace" of "the best works of Raphael". Second, the painting revealed through X-ray screening that Saint Joseph was painted after the Virgin and child were completed, based upon preparatory design or sketches, the changes could have only have been performed by Raphael and thus rules it out as a copy.

== Loreto ==
A copy was bequeathed by Girolamo Lottorio of Rome to the sanctuary of Loreto. Further, in 1759 the painting disappeared and was replaced by copies of poor quality. With that in mind, the painting's name might be more appropriately named after its original home in Popolo or its resting place in Chantilly.

== Engraved prints or lithographs ==
Michaeli Grecchi Lucchese, a 16th-century engraver, produced a print of the Madonna di Loreto in 1553.

At the Salon of 1814, Théodore Richomme, a noted engraver of great paintings such as Raphael's Madonnas, received a medal for an unprecedented showing of prints, notably for the supreme quality modern engraving of Raphael's Madonna of Loreto and Adam and Eve.

Abolitionist Harriet Beecher Stowe's Palmetto Leaves (1873), a memoir and travel guide of Florida in the days following the end of the American Civil War, recounts comments from a woman named Minnah upon seeing the lithograph of Madonna of the Veil by Raphael:

O good Lord! If there ain't da Good Man when he was a baby. How harmless he lies there! so innocent! And here we be, we wicked sinners, turning our backs on him, and going to the Old Boy. Oh Lord, Oh Lord! we ought to be better than we be: we sartin ought.

== See also ==
- List of paintings by Raphael
