= Carlo Ascenzi =

Italian painter

Carlo Ascenzi (Rome, 17th century) was an Italian painter, active in a Baroque style.

== Biography ==
He was a pupil of Pietro da Cortona. He was a member of the Academy of San Luca and of the Association of the Virtuosi of the Pantheon. He painted a large canvas depicting St Nicola and the Virgin for the church of San Nicola of Genazzano. He also painted for the ceiling of San Carlo al Corso in Rome.
