= Pietro Lucatelli =

Italian painter

Pietro Lucatelli (c. 1630-after 1690) was an Italian painter active during the Baroque period in Rome. He was born near Rome. He was a pupil of Ciro Ferri and Pietro da Cortona, and his pictures in the church of Sant' Agostino and the Palazzo Colonna show boldness and freedom of colouring. At Siena he painted a Beato Galgano for the church of San Francesco, and an Assumption for the hospital of Santa Maria della Scala. He was living in 1690, and died destitute and poor in Rome.

Pietro Locatelli, an alternative name, is also the name of a famous violinist.
