= Villa Pigneto del Marchese Sacchetti =

Villa Pigneto
- Sacchetti
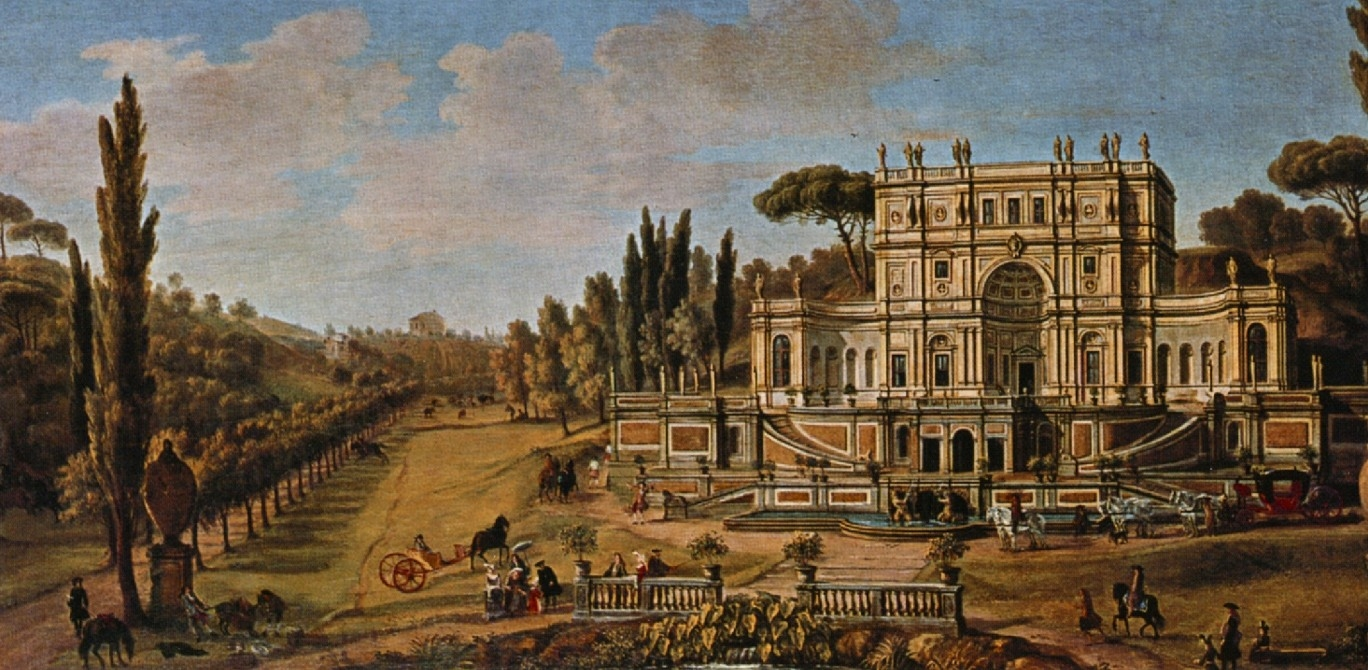
- Villa Pigneto
- Interactive map of the Villa Pigneto area

General information
- Location: Rome, Italy

The Villa Pigneto or Sacchetti, or also the Casino al Pigneto del Marchese Sacchetti was a villa in Rome, Italy, designed by the Baroque artist Pietro da Cortona. A second, plainer, Villa Sacchetti, now called Villa Chigi, is found at Castelfusano near Ostia and also was decorated (if not designed) by Cortona.

The Roman villa was an elaborately decorated suburban casino or (lodge), that stood only for some decades after completion in 1630, just at the then-outskirts of Rome (now Pigneto Sacchetti train stop) at the foot of Monte Mario. From the top rampart of the garden entrance, one should have been able to glimpse above the surrounding pine forest (pigneto) the domes of St Peter's Basilica and central Rome.

As the name casino implies, this was a "pleasure house", a lodge where notables could take refuge from the crowded Rome. The villa suburbana was commissioned by the Florentine Marchese Marcello Sacchetti, papal treasurer of the profligate Barberini Pope Urban VIII. Other members of this family benefited for a few decades from association with the pope, including his brother Giulio, named cardinal, and another brother, named general of papal armies. Cortona, a fellow Tuscan, designed the villa for his long-time patron.

We can only reconstruct the villa from etchings, paintings, plans, and scant architectural ruins left, although the findings generally agree. The effort was the fruit of one of Cortona's first architectural designs. The house was built on a high plinth on a hillside. The favored garden approach had three tiers, not unlike Vignola's Villa Giulia from the previous century; daring symmetric flights of stairs gave drama to the entrance and flanked a large basin-fountain with cascading waters and a nymphaeum. Atop a three-story pavilion with lower forward-thrusting wings. The concave forward embrace of the wings is reinforced by the central exedra, which recalls the Cortile del Belvedere (Cortile della Pigna) in the Vatican. Unlike the Villa Giulia and the Belvedere, the facade is elaborately decorated. Statuary, in a style reminiscent of Palladio's Palazzo Chiericati (1550) at Vicenza, crenelated the skyline. In a model to be repeated by Cortona's never-implemented plans for Palazzo Chigi in Rome and later by the Trevi Fountain, this palace integrates the fountains into the entrance.

Within 50 years, the Sacchettis and Barberini fell out of favor, the palace fell in great disrepair, and soon became a ruin. The villa also had its contemporary critics; Bernini likened the structure to a "Christmas crib" (Presepio) In the middle of the 19th century, the site was sold by the surviving Sacchettis, and the remaining structure razed. It was, for its day a daring design, which influenced other baroque creations. Today, the area is a park (Pineto).

== Sources ==
- Connors, Joseph (1998). "Pietro da Cortona 1597-1669". The Journal of the Society of Architectural Historians. 57 (3). Society of Architectural Historians: 318–321. doi:10.2307/991350. JSTOR 991350.
