= Giovanni Quagliata =

Italian painter (1603–1673)

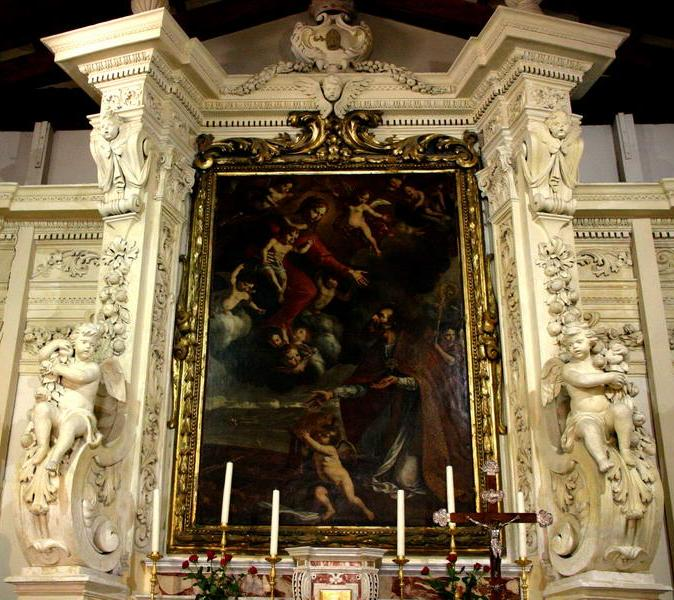
Apparition of the Virgin Mary to Saint Paul above the altar at the Church of Santa Rita.

Giovanni Quagliata (1603–1673) was an Italian painter of the Baroque period. He is more properly known in Italy as Giovan Battista Quagliata (and Giambattista Quagliata), one of the leading artists of the Messinesi painters of the 17th century, as described by Francesco Susinno in his book "The Lives of the Messinesi Painters" published in 1724. Giovanni was born in Messina, Italy. He was a pupil of Pietro da Cortona and enjoyed the patronage and friendship of the Spanish Viceroy of Sicily, Don Juan José of Austria (Viceroy from 1649 to 1651; also known as John of Austria the Younger). Giovanni's brother, Andrea Quagliata (born in 1594 or 1599, and died in 1660), was also an historical painter, but of lesser significance. Giovanni's works – paintings, frescoes and large canvases – were famously displayed in the galleries and churches of Messina, but due to earthquakes from Mount Etna and wartime bombings, few have survived to the present day.

== Biography ==
Giovanni's father, Giovan Domenico Quagliata, was a painter who lived in Rome in the late 16th century. He was an artist of talent, but not greatness. Unfortunately, we don't have the details of Giovan Domenico's birth, but a reasonable estimate would be 1570. His birthplace remains a mystery. If he was born on the mainland, it's highly likely he was part of the Quagliata family located in Balvano. Possibly looking for a better market for his talent and art, Giovan Domenico moved from Rome to the growing trade center of Messina, arriving in Sicily in the late 16th century. Unfortunately Susinno does not cite the works of Giovan Domenico. Sometime before 1600, Giovan Domenico married a woman from Messina named Francesca LeDonne and together they had children. We know of two sons: Andrea Quagliata born in 1594 (or in 1599, and died in 1660) and Giovan Battista Quagliata born in 1603 (1603–1673, also known as Giovanni Quagliata). Andrea became a student of his father and was a capable painter. Giovanni was directed by his parents to study letters, but his studies were interrupted by the premature death of the father. Andrea, by that time a professional painter, convinced his younger brother to attend his school where Giovanni does well. Andrea married, but apparently did not have children.

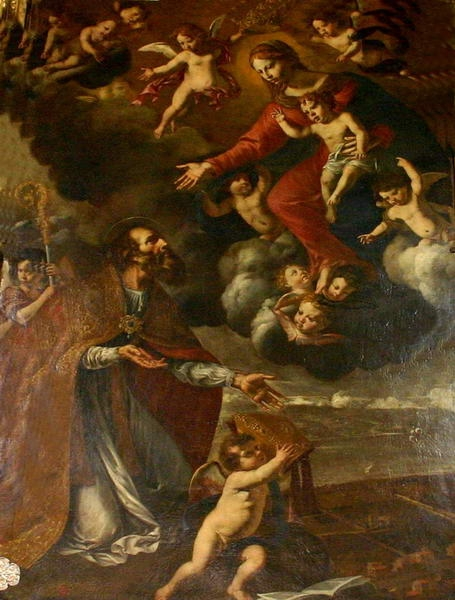
Apparition of the Virgin Mary to Saint Paul above the altar at the Church of Santa Rita – closeup.

Giovanni helped his brother with household income by painting small pictures and portraits. Giovanni became so attracted by the art of painting that he decided to journey to Rome to attend the prestigious school of Pietro Berrenttini from Cortona (also known as Pietro da Cortona). As Giovanni continued his studies under Cortona, it soon became clear that he was more talented than both his father and his brother. About age 24, he married a Roman woman named Cinzia Conticelli. During those years in Rome he created many works documented in the registers of the parish of San Nicola in Arcione, and he became a member of the Academy of Saint Luke – an association of artists in Rome, founded in 1593 for the purpose of elevating the work of "artists" above that of craftsman, which is still active today.

At age 37, perhaps enticed by lucrative commissions, Giovanni returned to Messina in 1640. There he enjoyed the patronage of the Spanish Viceroy of Sicily, Don Juan José of Austria. The Viceroy became a student of Giovanni's and the two became friends. Then, Giovanni's first wife, Cinzia, died and sometime later he married Flavia Alias, sister of the famous mathematician of the Company of Gesu, Vincenzo Alias. Giovanni had at least two children – two sons are known. Giovanni produced many famous works during this period. In time, Viceroy Don Juan José granted Giovanni Quagliata a noble title with a coat of arms and some land in the countryside area of Forza d'Agrò, Sicily, between the city and the sea, where the new city of Sant'Alessio Siculo later developed, and from where most of his descendants come. Giovanni's works – paintings, frescoes and large canvasses – were famously displayed in the galleries and churches of Messina, but due to earthquakes from Mount Etna and wartime bombings, few have survived to the present day. Surviving canvases include: 'The Apparition of the Virgin Mary to Saint Paul', 'The Sacrifice of Polissena', 'The Virgin Nativity', 'Immaculate Mary', and 'The Triumph of David'.
