= Villa Sacchetti at Castelfusano =

Historical building in Rome, Italy

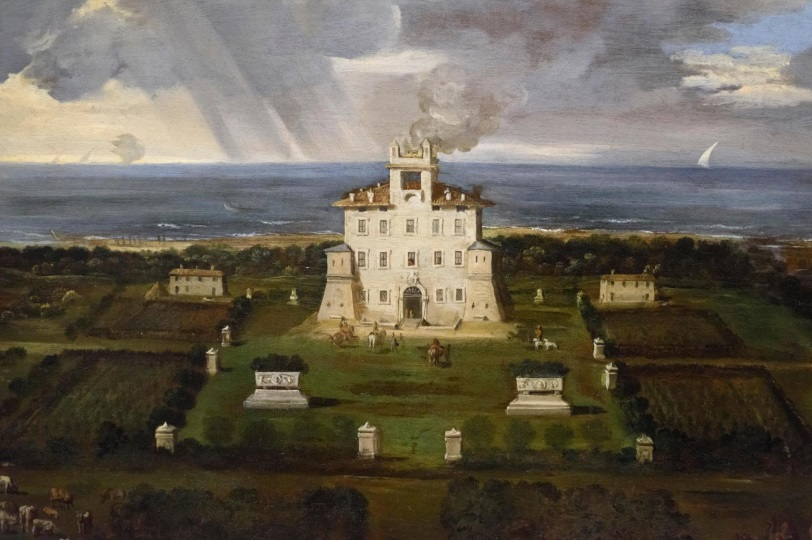
Villa Sacchetti in a 17th century painting

The Villa Sacchetti, also called Castello Chigi, is a historical building at Castelfusano, near Ostia Antica, Rome, Italy. It was built in 1624-1629 for the Sacchetti family, close associates of Pope Urban VIII, and was the first architectural work of Pietro da Cortona. The villa is now known as Castello Chigi since its acquisition by the Chigi family in the 18th century.

== Description ==
The villa has a generally fortified appearance; it is block-like with corner bastions and has a belvedere terrace at the top; there were occasional attacks by pirates along the coast. The plan layout, recorded in drawings by Pier Leone Ghezzi (circa 1735), is simple and straightforward and lacks the formal inventiveness of Cortona's later architectural work, including the Villa Pigneto del Marchese Sacchetti.

The ground level has a central hall with staircase and was otherwise given over to service rooms. On the third level, there is a gallery spanning the length of the building with frescoes by Cortona and other artists of the time including Andrea Sacchi. There is also a chapel decorated by Cortona.
