= Via Anagnina =

Street in Rome, Italy

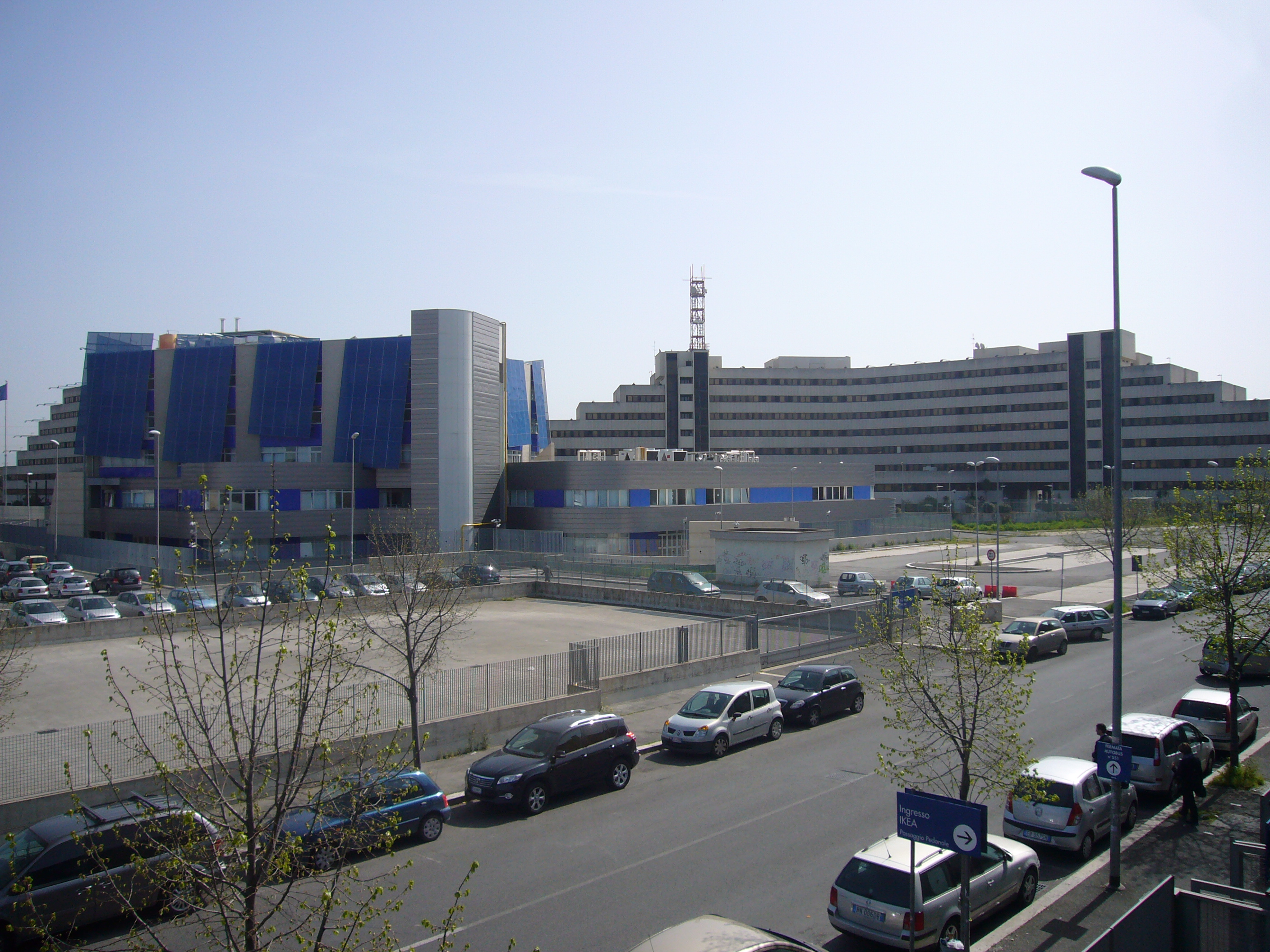
- Interactive map of Via Anagnina
- Location: Rome (Italy)
- Arrondissement: Municipio VII

Construction
- Inauguration: 1933

Via Anagnina is a street in Rome (Italy) which partially corresponds to the ancient via Latina.
Its name comes from the former connection between Rome and the city of Anagni that the street provided.

== Route ==
=== Urban section ===
Via Anagnina runs from Via Tuscolana (exit nr. 22 of the Grande Raccordo Anulare) to the borders of the Municipality of Rome, beyond which it enters the Municipality of Grottaferrata.

=== Suburban section ===
Outside the Municipality of Rome, the street changes its name to "Strada statale 511 Anagnina" and ends in Grottaferrata.
In the Municipality of Grottaferrata, at the tenth mile of the former Via Latina, there is the small catacomb Ad Decimum, into use between the 3rd and the 4th century. Its small size and the modesty of the finds suggests that it was used by freedmen and workers employed in the nearby villae.

=== History ===
The street was established in 1933. Since 1972, as per Resolution nr. 3246 of 30 May 1972, it was included in the Municipio X.

After the war, several small and medium-sized manufacturing companies were established along the street, as well as one of the giants of Roman industry, FATME (construction of telephone systems), which moved here from the Appian Way in 1960 also thanks to the intervention of the Cassa per il Mezzogiorno. The company, which employed over 4,000 people, was one of the strongholds of the working class in the city, until – with the changing times, technologies and productions – in the 1990s it was definitively acquired by Ericsson, which established here its Italian headquarters.

== Historical and archaeological sites ==
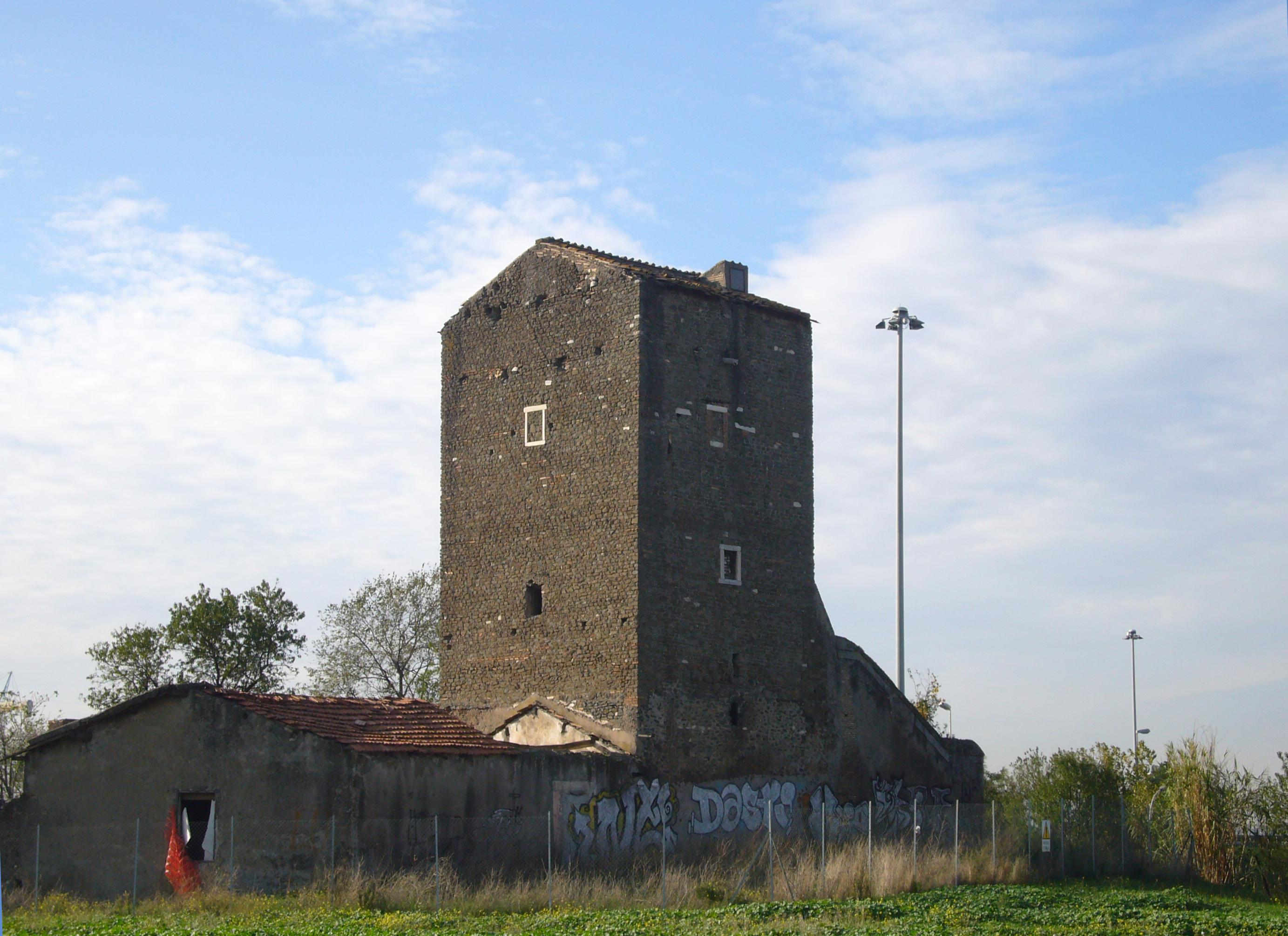
Torre di Mezzavia, rising between Via Tuscolana and Via Anagnina.

In Roman times, the ancient Via Latina crossed a very anthropized territory: villae and farms have therefore left traces which are periodically unearthed during the urbanization works and the consequent archaeological surveys. In February 2011, for example, 6 Severan sculptures, arguably pertaining to the family mausoleum of a villa, were found into a basin.

== Major buildings ==
Some important buildings for services have been created in the area called Torre di Mezzavia, immediately outside the Grande Raccordo Anulare between Via Tuscolana and Via Anagnina: since 2004, one of the first large Roman shopping centers is active (24,000 square metres (260,000 sq ft) on 2 levels, 56 shops, over 4 million visitors a year, about 1,200 parking spaces). In the area there are also other stores of multinational companies such as Euronics and IKEA.

== Transports ==
The main hub of public transport serving the area is the Anagnina station of Rome Metro line A: it is the south-east terminus of the Line, as well as the terminus of several bus lines and an exchange station for the Cotral extra-urban bus lines heading south-east.

== See also ==
- Tor Vergata
