= Saline di Ostia =

Urban area in Ostia Antica, Rome

Coordinates: 41.762093°N 12.291813°E

- Urban area
- Nickname: Saline
- Interactive map of Saline di Ostia
- Country: Italy
- Region: Lazio
- Comune: Metropolitan City of Rome Capital
- District: Ostia Antica
- Founder: Ancus Marcius; Benito Mussolini (as an official settlement)

Saline di Ostia is an urban area of the Municipio X of the Metropolitan City of Rome Capital (Zone "O" 40), located in Z. XXXV, Ostia Antica.

It borders on its north-west with Fiumicino, and on the north-east with Bagnoletto, south-west with Ostia Antica , and south-east with the road Via dei Romagnoli.

The area is located in a location adjacent to the Tiber river and the Via del Mare along the main roads: Via Giuseppe Fiorelli and Via del Collettore Primario.

== History ==
=== Antiquity ===
The area derives its name from the presence of two natural salt pans. These salt pans were already being exploited by the Veii in antiquity. According to Roman tradition, it was Ancus Marcius, the founder of Ostia, who organized the exploitation of the salt pans and expanded their extent as part of his establishment of a port to serve Rome.

The salt pans of the Roman coast were among the most important centres of salt production in the Italian peninsula from antiquity onward and played a significant role in the local economy. Historical and archaeological evidence distinguishes two separate salt-producing areas, one on the right bank of the Tiber in the Portus territory and the other on the left bank in the territory of Ostia. Both were probably exploited from the Protohistoric period through the Middle Ages, although only the Ostian salt pans remained in production into the modern era. The Ostia saltworks were closely associated with the adjacent coastal lagoon, which supplied seawater to the evaporation basins through a natural channel. Archaeological investigations have identified remains of Roman salt pans and medieval hydraulic works, although the historical development and topography of both salt-producing areas remain only partly understood.

=== Medieval period ===
Documentary evidence indicates that the Ostia salt pans remained in use throughout the Middle Ages. Medieval records refer to salt-producing plots (fili salinarii) in the Campo Ostiensi, distinguishing them from the salt pans of Portus on the opposite bank of the Tiber, which were known as Campo Maiore or Campo Salino. Charters dating from the XII Century to the XIV centuries record grants, leases, and sales of salt pans to ecclesiastical institutions, including the Archbasilica of St. John Lateran, the monasteries of Sant'Alessio and St. Paul Outside the Walls, and the churches of Santa Maria Nova and Santa Maria in Via Lata. The Ostia salt pans are also mentioned in the Statutes of the Roman Salt Tax (Statuti della Gabella di Roma) of 1398. By the XV century, historical records concerning the Portus salt pans cease, while those relating to the Ostia salt pans become more frequent, indicating that they were the only saltworks in the area to remain in operation going into the early modern period.

=== Modern period ===
Extensive archival records document the operation of the Ostia salt pans from the XVI to the XIX century under the administration of the Reverenda Camera Apostolica, which leased the saltworks to private contractors. These records describe the organization and maintenance of the salt pans, including the upkeep of canals and embankments used to regulate the flow of seawater, as well as the seasonal nature of salt production, which was highly dependent on weather conditions and vulnerable to flooding by the Tiber. XVII and XVIII century documents also record repairs to hydraulic infrastructure and identify the Fosso Papale as the principal channel supplying seawater to the evaporation basins. By the late eighteenth century, the saltworks had fallen into decline owing to inadequate maintenance of the canal system, which allowed freshwater to mix with seawater and prevented the crystallization of salt. Although repair works continued into the late eighteenth century and several XIX proposals sought to restore production, none was implemented.

=== Contemporary period ===
During the rule of Benito Mussolini, as part of the Battle for Land, started in 1928, the area was cleared and numerous pine trees and eucalyptus trees were planted. The latter were imported from Australia and were strategically planted in order to absorb water from the soil in significant quantity. This effort was finalized under his government, but sources show that an effort to turn the no longer profitable and salt-lacking basin into a livable and arable territory started after the unification of Italy.

== Further readings ==
- Carlo Fea (1831). Storia delle Saline d'Ostia introdotte da Anco Marcio quarto re di Roma dopo la fondazione di quella città. Roma: Stamperia della rev. Camera apostolica.
