= Bagnoletto =

Urban area in Ostia Antica, Rome

- Urban area and quarter
- Interactive map of Bagnoletto
- Coordinates: 41°46′48″N 12°19′29″E
- Country: Italy
- City: Rome
- District: Ostia Antica
- Administrative subdivision: Municipio X
- Website: Official website

Bagnoletto is an urban area and quarter of the Municipio X of the Metropolitan City of Rome Capital. It is part of the Z. zone. XXXV Ostia Antica.

It borders on its north-west with Fiumicino, north east with Dragona, on the south east with Saline di Ostia and Via dei Romagnoli.
