= Infernetto =

Coordinates: 41.73556°N 12.36056°E

Infernetto is a suburban zone of Rome, Italy. Infernetto is under Rome Municipio X administration.

Infernetto is located in Municipio X, the southern area of the city, close to Ostia Lido and the coast, it's almost completely surrounded by Castelfusano pinewood and the Presidential Estate of Castelporziano. From its northern side, Infernetto is connected through Cristoforo Colombo road to the rest of the city. In 2014 the population of Infernetto was about 27,000 [Ufficio Anagrafico, 2014].

== History ==
In Roman times, it was a large cultivated area; however, after the fall of the Western Roman Empire the land was abandoned, becoming a wetland and a malaric zone.

Starting from the Middle Ages the area was inhabited by a few people that lived in thatched huts from a group of hunters or lumberjacks, and people making coal by burning the wood from the local forest in a stack covered by 40 cm of soil. Soon the coal from wood become the first economy in the zone to sell in Rome: the name "Infernetto" (Italian for "Small hell") derives directly from this activity, because during the 18th and 19th century one could see a big column of dark smoke in the sky, sometimes even from the center of Rome, made from the coal production.

During the Fascist age the Infernetto area was drained, and started growing up as a farm town. In the 1970s, it started to growing up as an illegal residential area, and many people built up houses without government license and without any urbanistic plan.

In the middle of 1990s the Roman council started to claim the street for fixing up, and built new infrastructure.
