= Castelfusano =

Urban park in the comune of Rome, Italy

- Interactive map of Castelfusano
- Coordinates: 41°44′05″N 12°19′11″E

Castelfusano is an urban park in the comune of Rome. It divides the sea quarter of Ostia and the neighborhood of Casalpalocco. The castle and the park were founded in the 17th century by the Sacchetti family. Its vegetation consists mainly in a forest of colossal Maritime Pines and olm oaks (near the seaside). In the 18th century, the Sacchetti sold the property to the Chigi, who sold it in 1933 to the commune of Rome. In the park is still visible a stretch of the ancient Via Severiana. The park's vegetation was largely destroyed by arson in July 2000.

== Environment ==
=== Flora ===
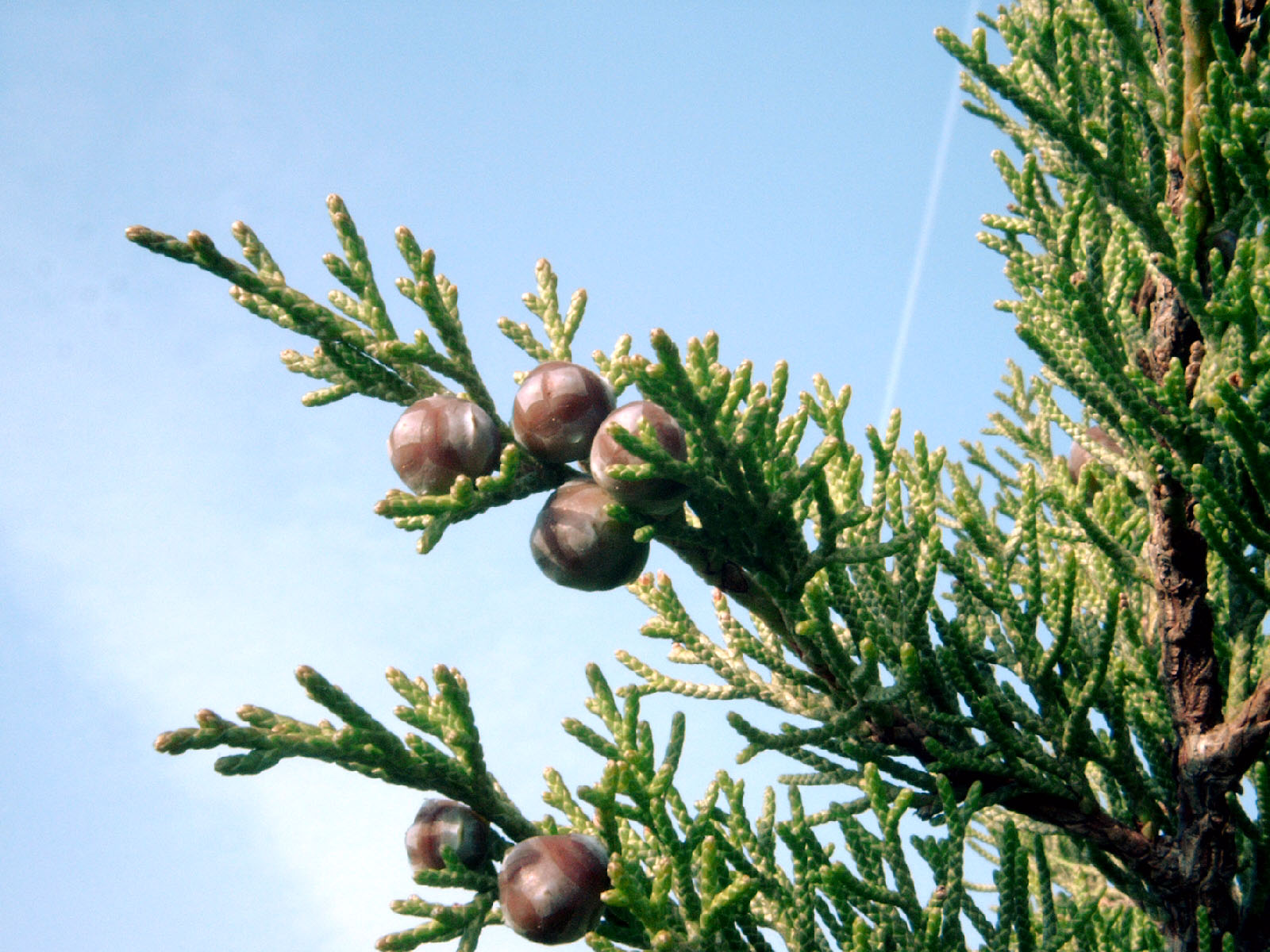
A branch of Phoenician juniper (Juniperus phoenicea).

A floristic study by Maria Grazia Guerrazzi identified the presence of 455 species divided into 272 genera and 73 families.

There is a strong presence, within the evergreen Maquis shrubland, of lecci and domestic pines (Pinus pinea) introduced by man in recent centuries. Among the various species, one can observe the strawberry tree, the lentiscus, the fillirea, the tree heather, the myrtle, the alaterno, the Phoenician juniper, the rosemary and the osiris. There are asparagus plants in the undergrowth, but harvesting them is prohibited.

=== Fauna ===
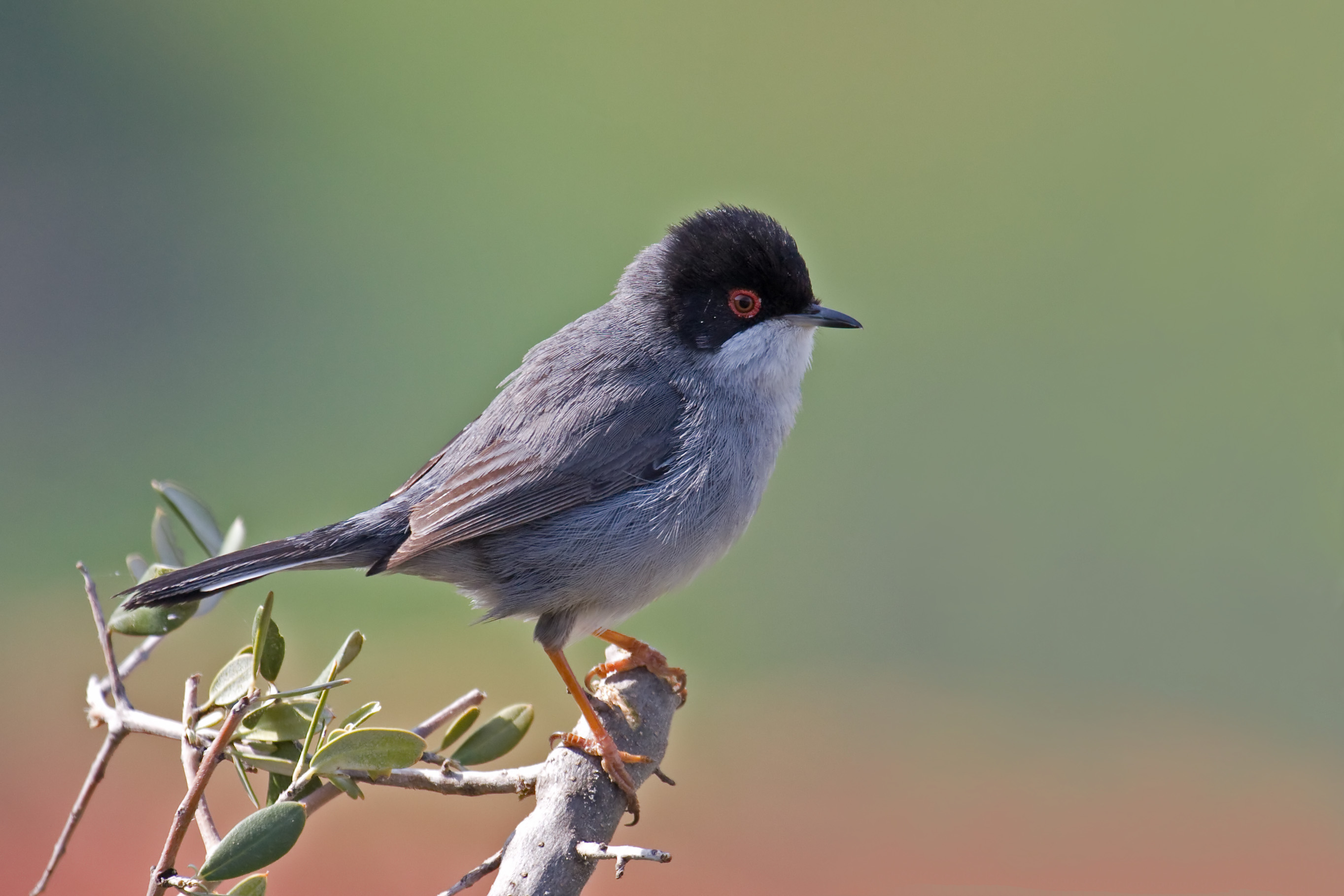
A warbler (Sylvia melanocephala).

The area has been rich in game and birds since ancient times. In some periods, excessive hunting exploitation led local authorities to issue hunting bans for neighboring populations; for example, on 5 June 1277 there was a "ban on fowling and transit without authorisation". The Sacchetti family later restored the authorization "to bird and hunt wild boars, roe deer, deer, hares, porcupines, and hedgehogs", but the activity was probably excessive given that a century later a chirograph of Pope Benedict XIII re-established the hunting reserve with severe penalties for those who violated it.

In the past there were large mammals now extinct in the area: the deer (Cervus elaphus), the roe deer (Capreolus capreolus), the fallow deer (Dama dama).

Currently we encounter foxes (Vulpes vulpes), wild boars (Sus scrofa), weasels, martens, hedgehogs (Erinaceus europaeus), porcupines (Hystrix cristata), moles (Talpa europaea), wild rabbits (Oryctolagus cuniculus) and badgers. Numerous birds are also present in the area, such as woodpeckers, hoopoes (Upupa epops), blackcaps (Sylvia atricapilla), wrens (Troglodytes troglodytes ), warblers (Sylvia melanocephala), robins, redstarts (Phoenicurus phoenicurus), cuckoos, woodpeckers, reed warblers (Acrocephalus scirpaceus ), egrets (Egretta garzetta), herons (Ardea purpurea and Ardea cinerea), kingfishers (Alcedo atthis), moorhens (Gallinula chloropus), black-winged stilts (Himantopus himantopus), other typical species of the Mediterranean macchia.

In 1986 a study was carried out on the fauna by Italia Nostra, but studies had already been carried out on the avifauna, in particular between 1930 and 1938 by the Ornithological Observatory of Castelfusano. Rare insect species can also be encountered.
