= Municipio X =

Municipio X di Roma
- Municipio of Rome
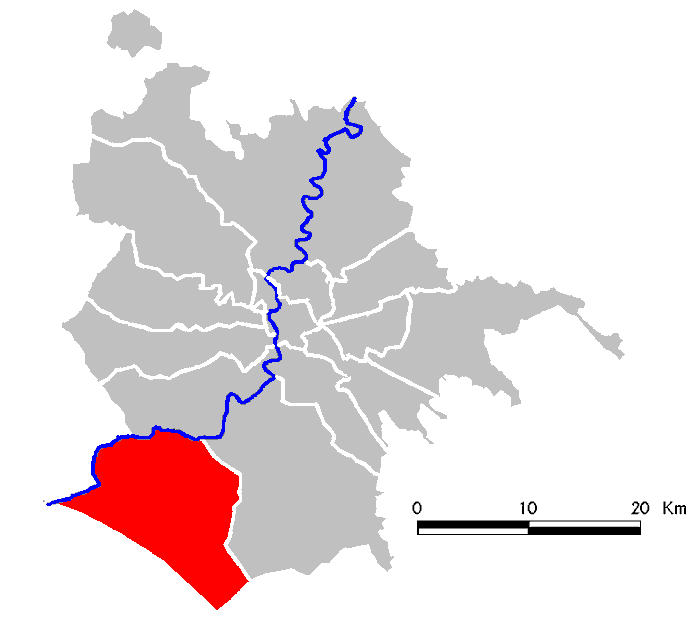
- Location of Municipio X of Rome
- Country: Italy
- Region: Lazio
- Comune: Rome
- Established: 19 January 2001; 11 March 2013 (renamed)

Government
  - President: Mario Falconi (PD)

Area
  - Total: 150.74 km^{2} (58.20 sq mi)

Population (2019)
  - Total: 231,220
- Time zone: UTC+1 (CET)
  - Summer (DST): UTC+2 (CEST)
- Website: Municipio X of Rome

Municipio X is one of the 15 administrative subdivisions of the city of Rome, Italy.

It was first created by Rome's City Council on 19 January 2001 as Municipio XIII and features a president who is elected during the mayoral elections. On 11 March 2013, following a municipal reorganization, its designation was officially changed to Municipio X.

== Subdivision ==
Municipio X is divided into 10 urban zones:

Urban zone	Population
13A. Malafede	16,844
13B. Acilia North	28,047
13C. Acilia South	25,594
13D. Palocco	27,120
13E. Ostia Antica	17,207
13F. Ostia North	43,291
13G. Ostia South	36,413
13H. Castel Fusano	1,494
13I. Infernetto	29,838
13X. Castel Porziano	145
Not localized	5,227
Total	231,220

== Municipal government ==
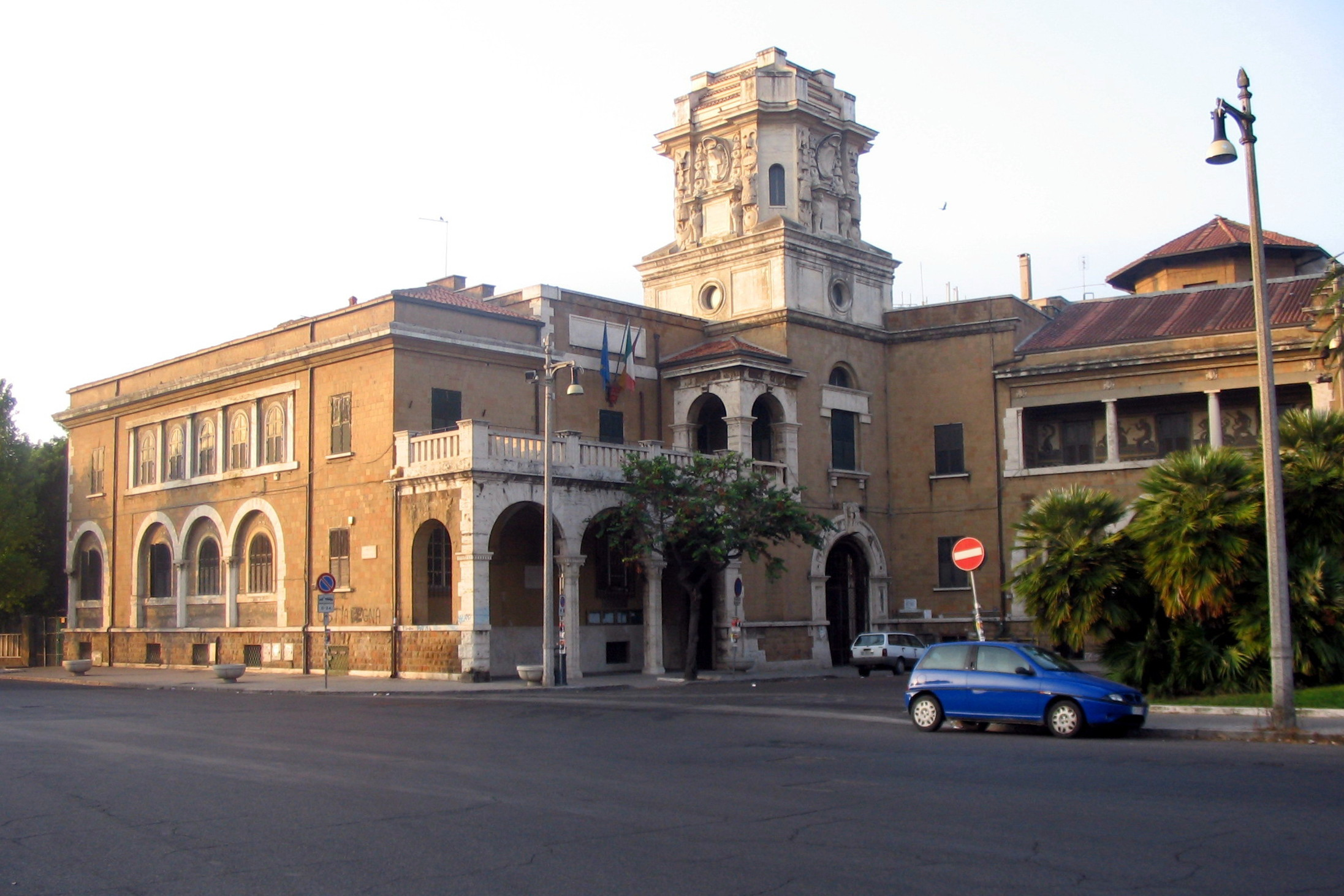
The seat of Municipio X in Ostia.

The area has its own local authority called Consiglio di Municipio (Municipal Council), composed by a president and 25 members directly elected by citizens every five years. The council is responsible for most local services, such as schools, social services, waste collection, roads, parks, libraries and local commerce in the area, and manages funds (if any) provided by the city government for specific purposes, such as those intended to guarantee the right to education for poorer families.

The current president is Mario Falconi (PD). He was elected in the 2021 Rome municipal election together with the 25-member Municipal Council, whose composition is shown below:

Alliance or political party	Members	
Alliance or political party	2021–2027	
Centre-left (PD-SI-DemoS-EV)	16	16 / 25
Centre-right (Lega-FdI)	5	5 / 25
Five Star Movement (M5S)	3	3 / 25
Action (A)	1	1 / 25

Here is a list of presidents of the Municipio X since 2001:

President	Party	Coalition	Term of office	
Davide Bordoni	FI	Centre-right	30 May 2001	30 May 2006
Paolo Ornelli	PD	Centre-left	30 May 2006	28 April 2008
Giacomo Vizzani	PdL	Centre-right	28 April 2008	12 June 2013
Andrea Tassone	PD	Centre-left	12 June 2013	18 March 2015 (Note: Resigned. On 27 August 2015 the national Government suspended the Municipal Council due to mafia association.)
Special Commissioner (2015–2017)
Giuliana Di Pillo	M5S		20 November 2017	18 October 2021
Mario Falconi	PD	Centre-left	18 October 2021	Incumbent

== Geography ==
The territory of the municipio is bounded by the Tyrrhenian Sea to the west and south-west, by the mouth of the Tiber river and the municipality of Fiumicino to the north-west, and by Pomezia to the south-east.

A substantial part of the territory is occupied by the protected green areas of the Castelfusano Pinewood Urban Park and the Castelporziano Presidential Estate, both forming a core section of the Litorale Romano State Nature Reserve. As of 2020, the municipio's urban green areas alone extend for more than 12.29 square kilometres (4.75 sq mi).

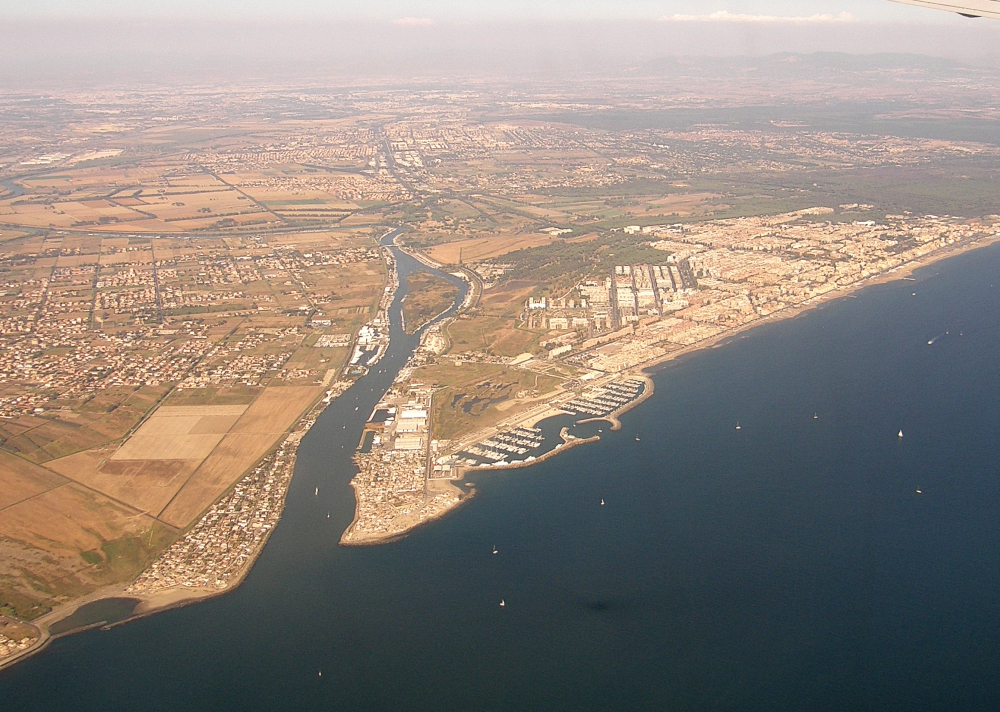
The mouth of the Tiber

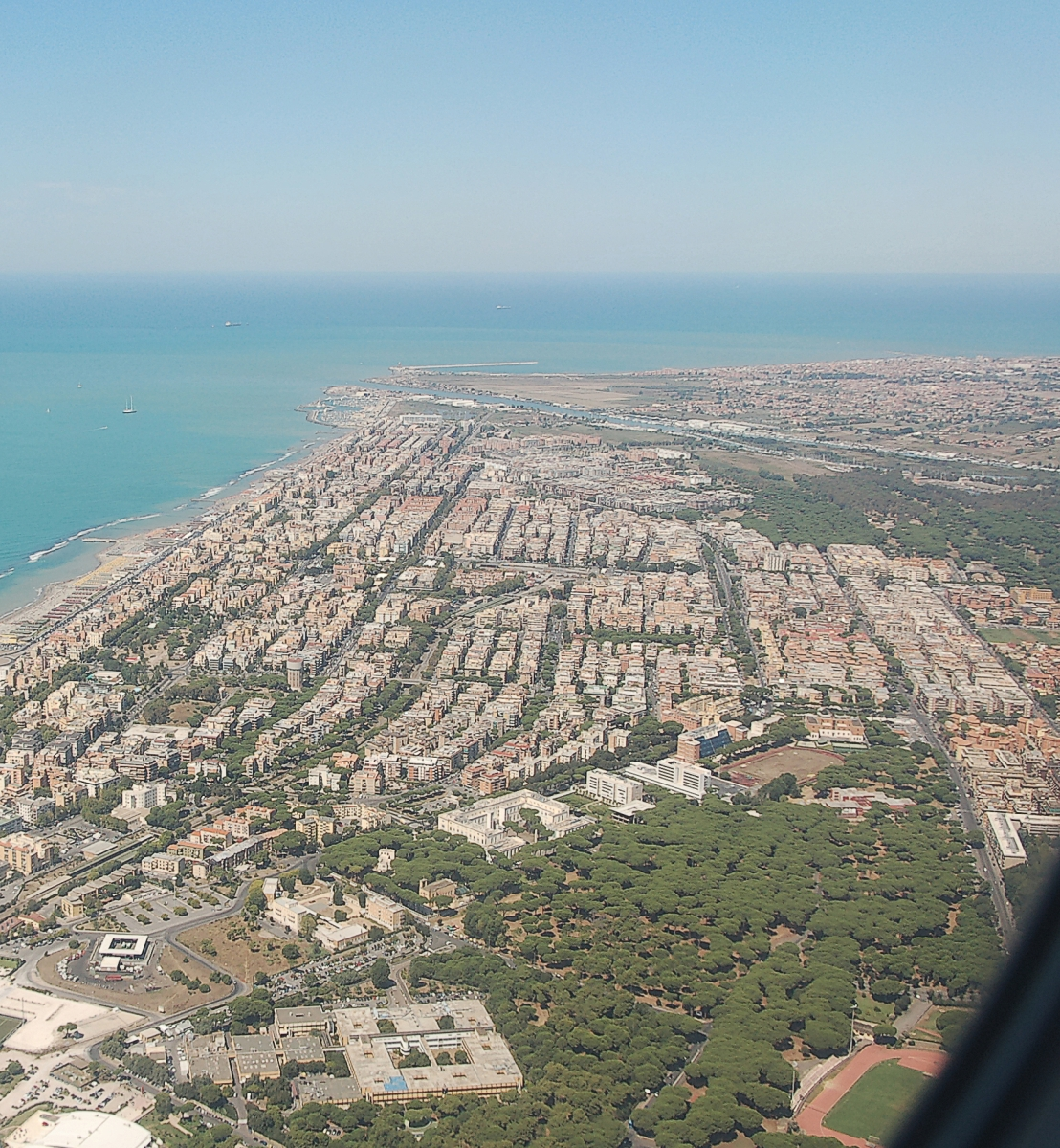
Aerial view of Ostia

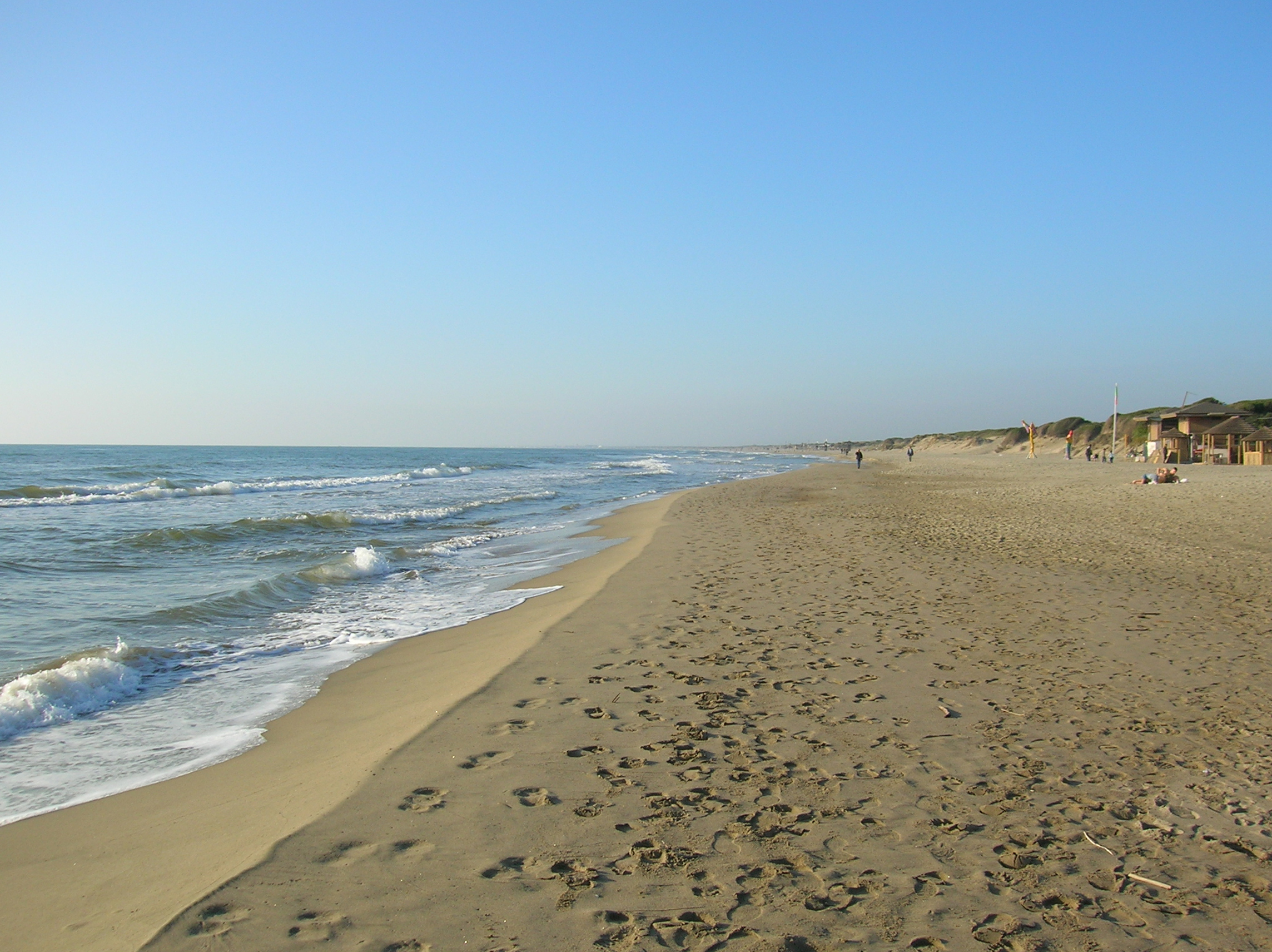
Beach of Capocotta in the Litorale Romano State Nature Reserve

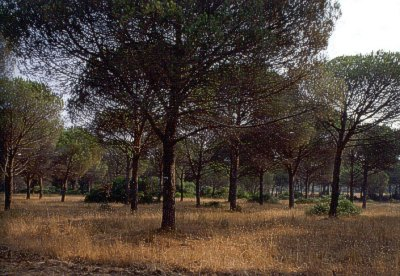
Castelfusano Pinewood

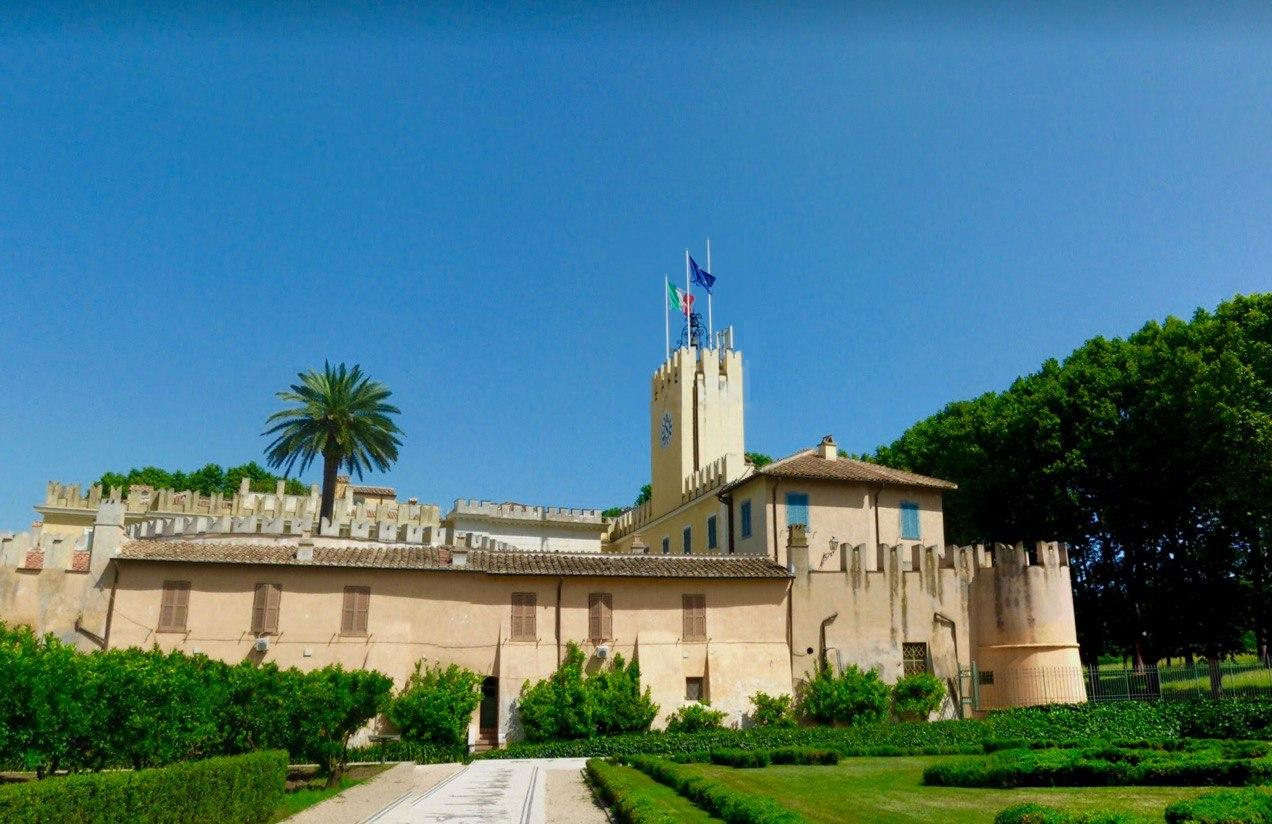
Castelfusano Presidential Estate

== History ==
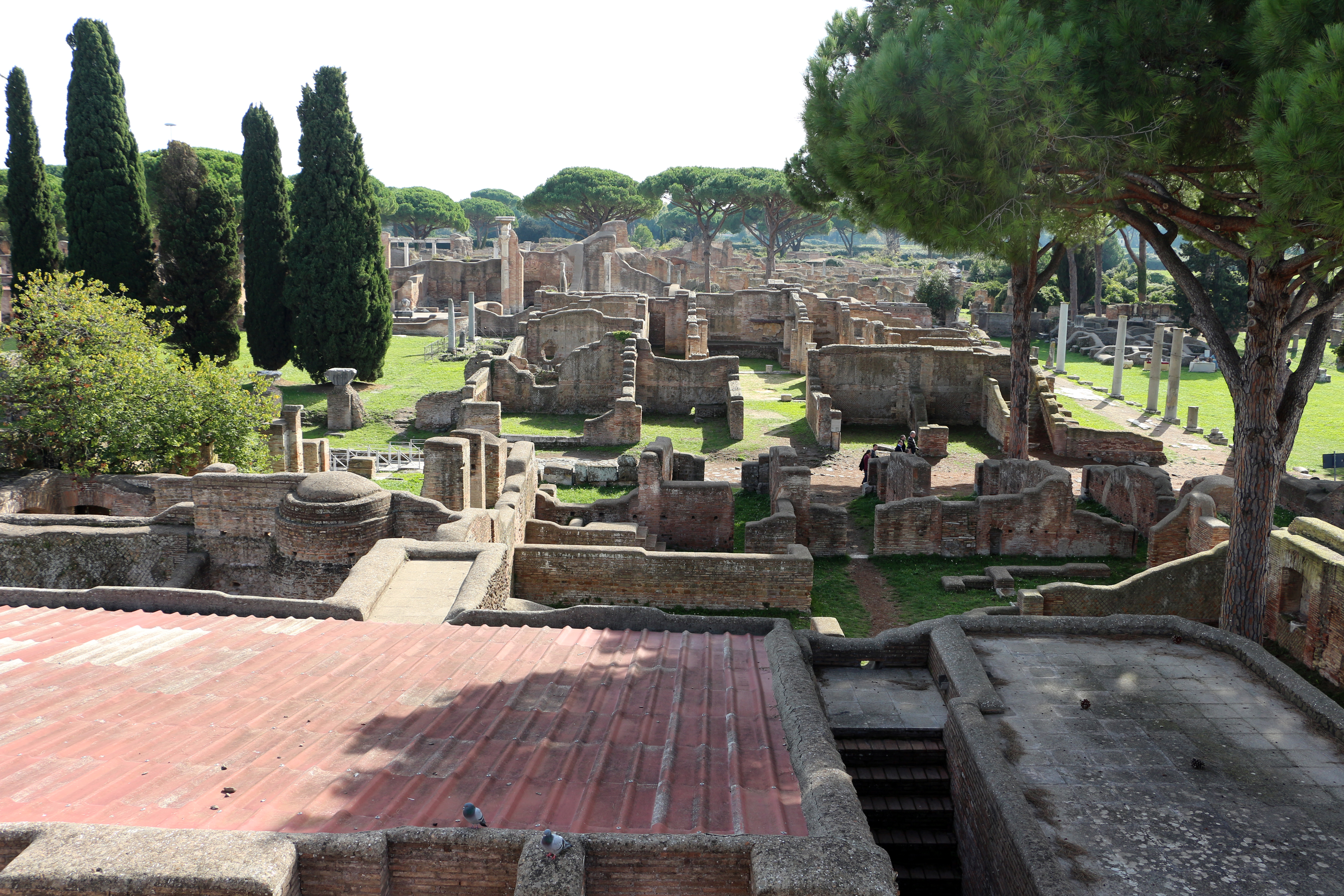
Archeological site of Ostia Antica.

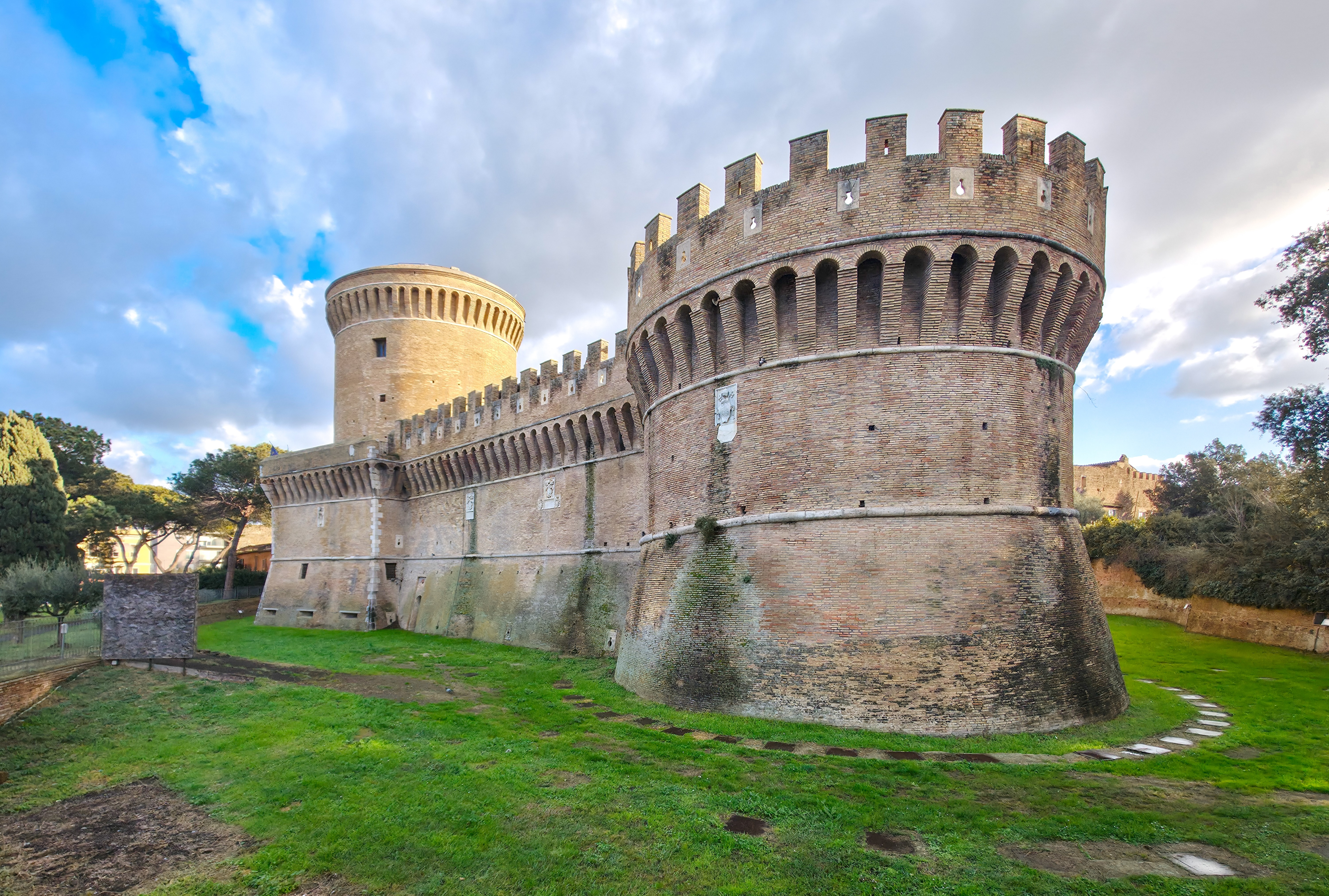
Castle of Julius II.

The history of the territory encompassing modern Municipio X is deeply rooted in the maritime expansion of ancient Rome, spanning from antiquity to its 20th-century urban transformation.

=== Antiquity and Decline ===
According to Roman tradition, Ostia was founded in the 7th century BC by Ancus Marcius, the fourth king of Rome, making it the city's first military colony (castrum) and official river port at the mouth of the Tiber. During the Roman Republic and Empire, Ostia grew into a thriving commercial metropolis serving as the main gateway for grain imports feeding the capital. However, with the progressive silting of the river mouth and the fall of the Western Roman Empire, the city was abandoned, and the area turned into a vast, malaria-ridden marshland.

=== Medieval and Early Modern Eras ===
During the Middle Ages, the population clustered around the small fortified citadel of *Gregoriopolis*, founded by Pope Gregory IV. In 1483, Bishop Giuliano della Rovere (later Pope Julius II) commissioned the construction of the monumental Castle of Julius II to control river toll collection and protect Rome from pirate incursions. The strategic role of the area ceased abruptly in 1557 following a cataclysmic flood that permanently shifted the course of the Tiber, leaving the castle landlocked.

=== Modern Reclamation and Development ===
The modern rebirth of Ostia began in 1884, when a colony of Romagnol laborers (scariolanti) arrived from Ravenna to permanently drain the marshes and eradicate malaria. Following the reclamation, the Italian government promoted the development of a modern seaside resort connected to the capital. The inauguration of the Via Ostiense and the Rome–Lido railway in 1924 transformed Lido di Ostia into Rome's official beach district. During the Fascist era, the area saw massive urban planning developments—anchored by the monumental Via Cristoforo Colombo and designed in the Rationalist architectural style—laying the groundwork for the dense residential expansion of the post-WWII era.

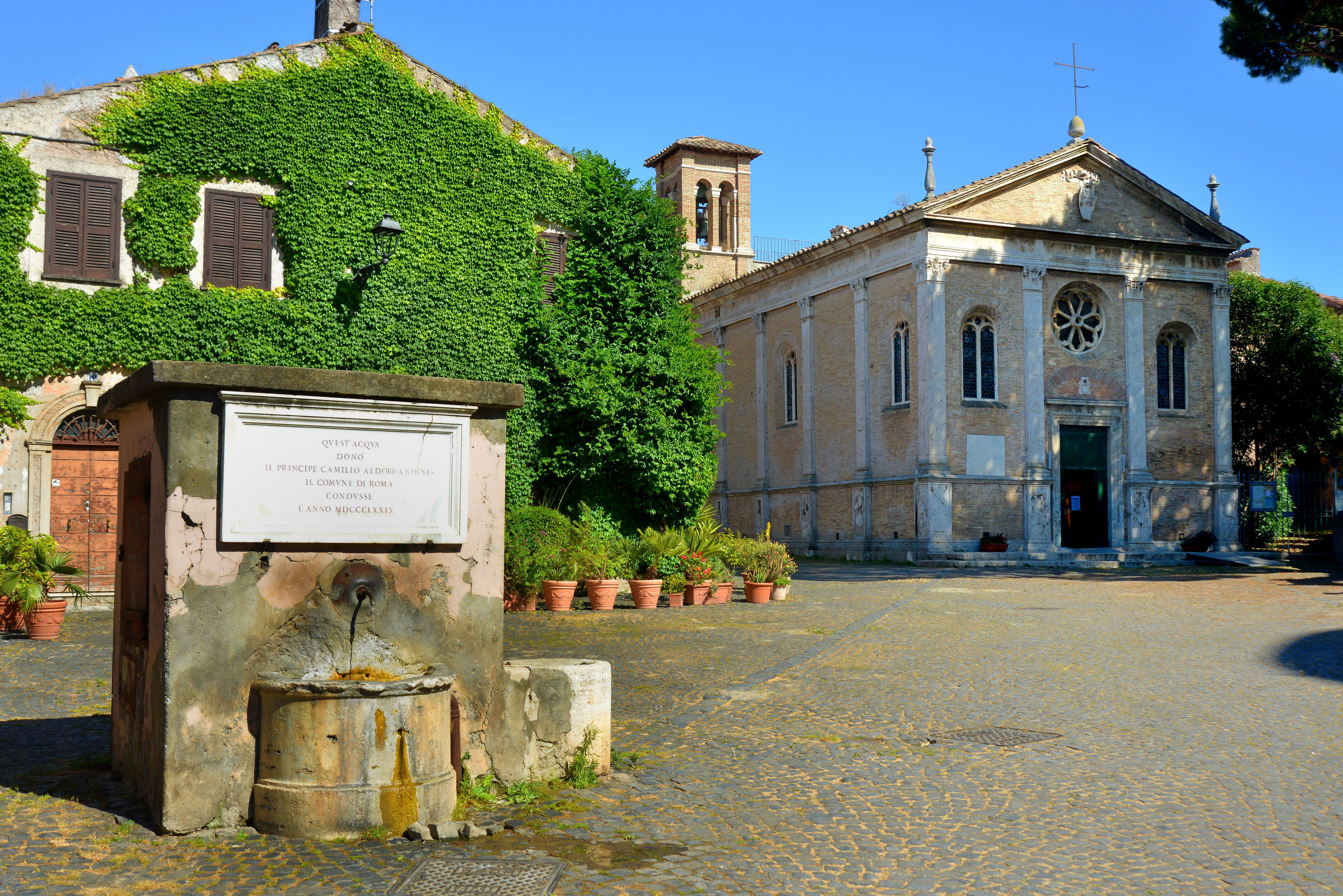
Santa Aurea basilica in Ostia Antica

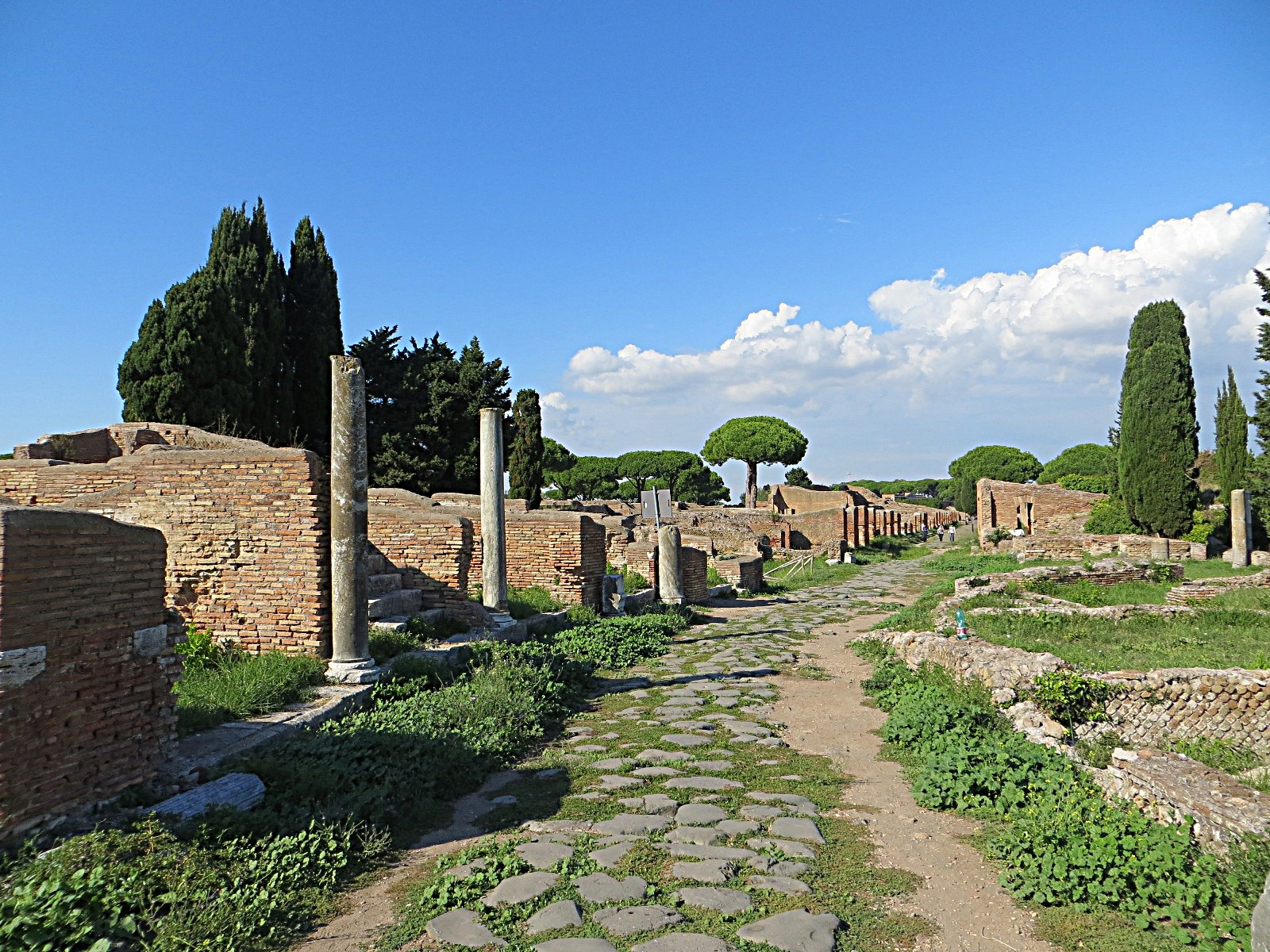
Archeological site of Ostia Antica

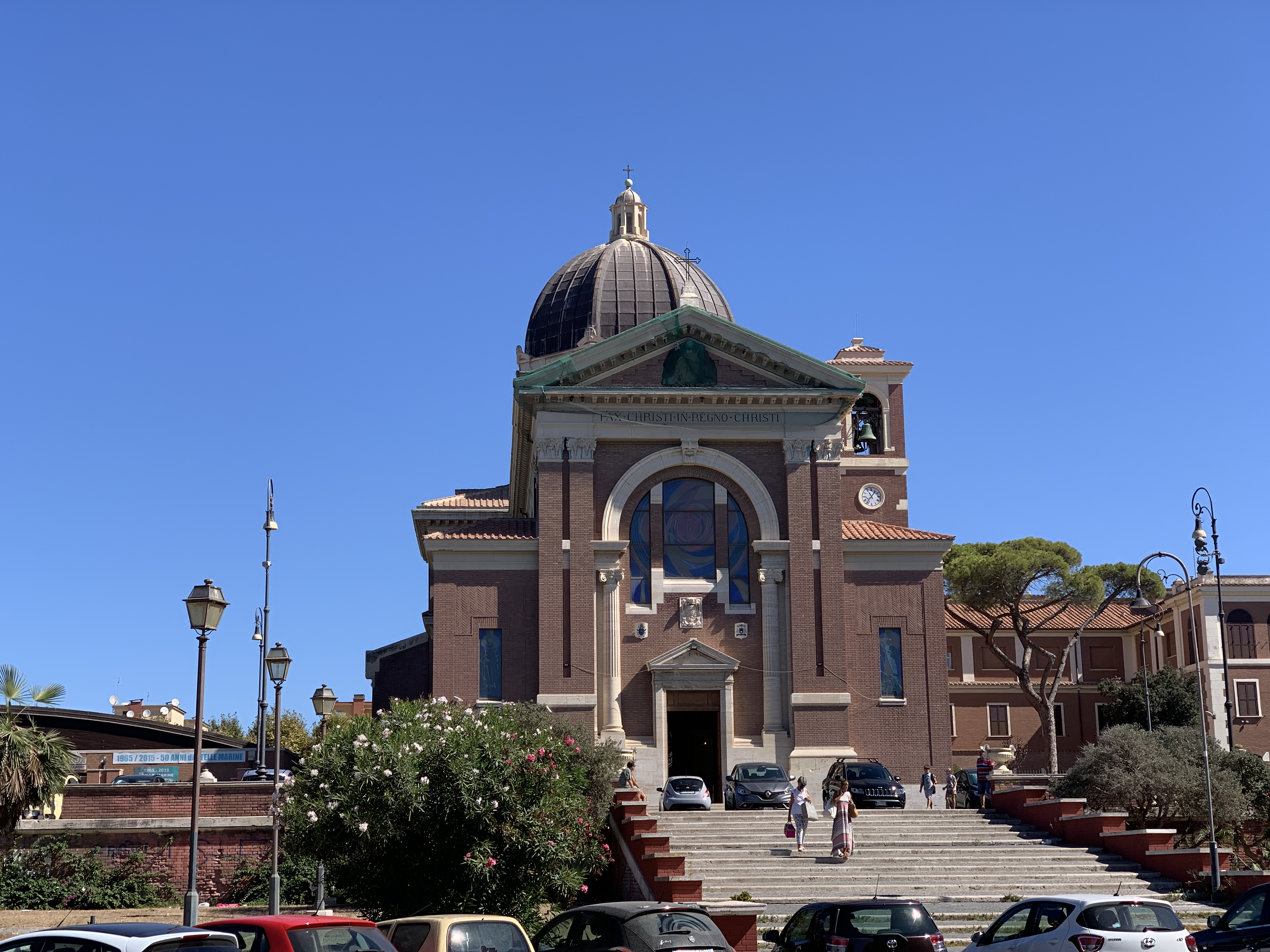
Santa Maria Regina Pacis a Ostia Lido, consecrated in 1928

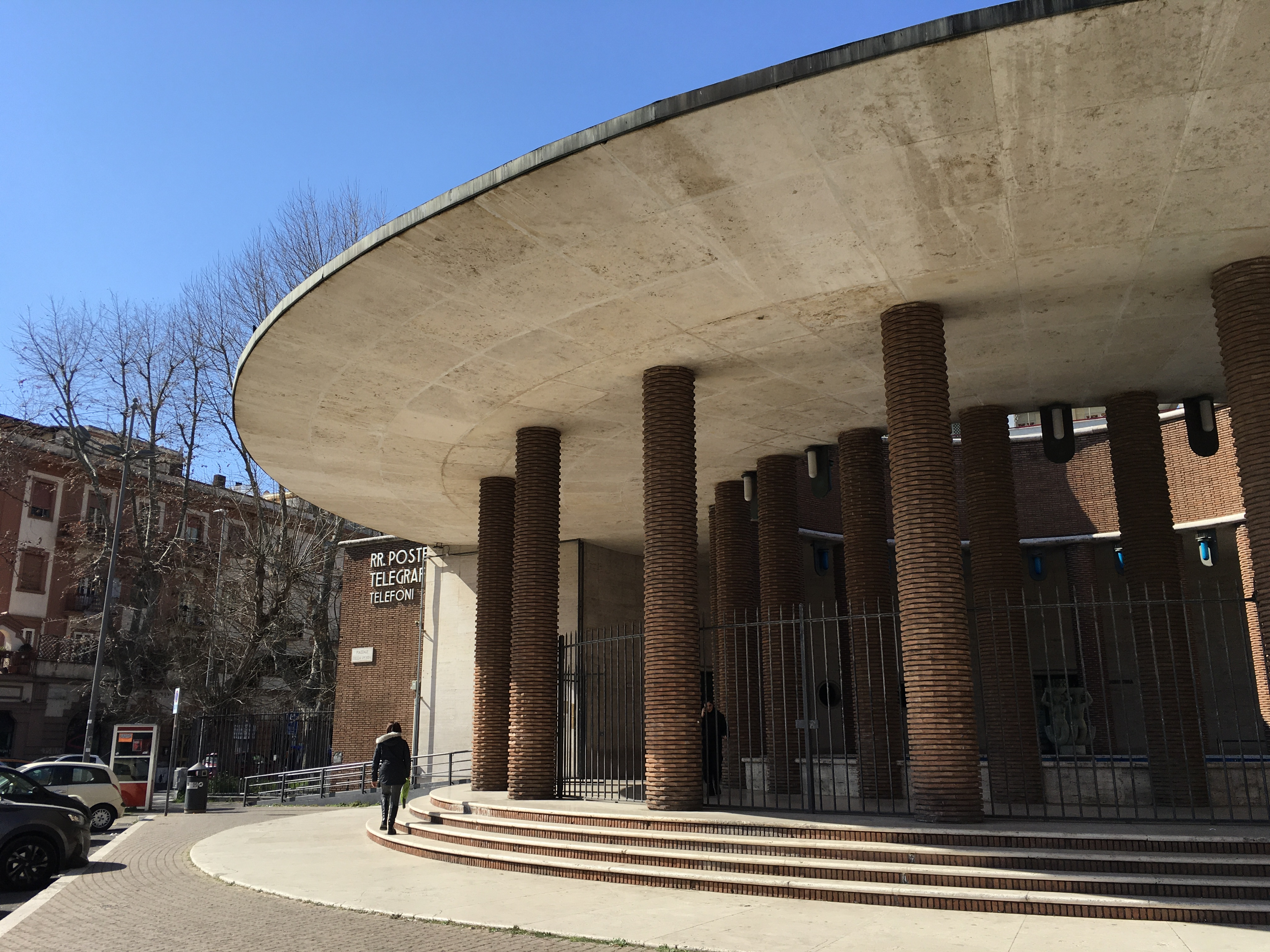
Rationalist style Ostia Lido post office, opened in 1934

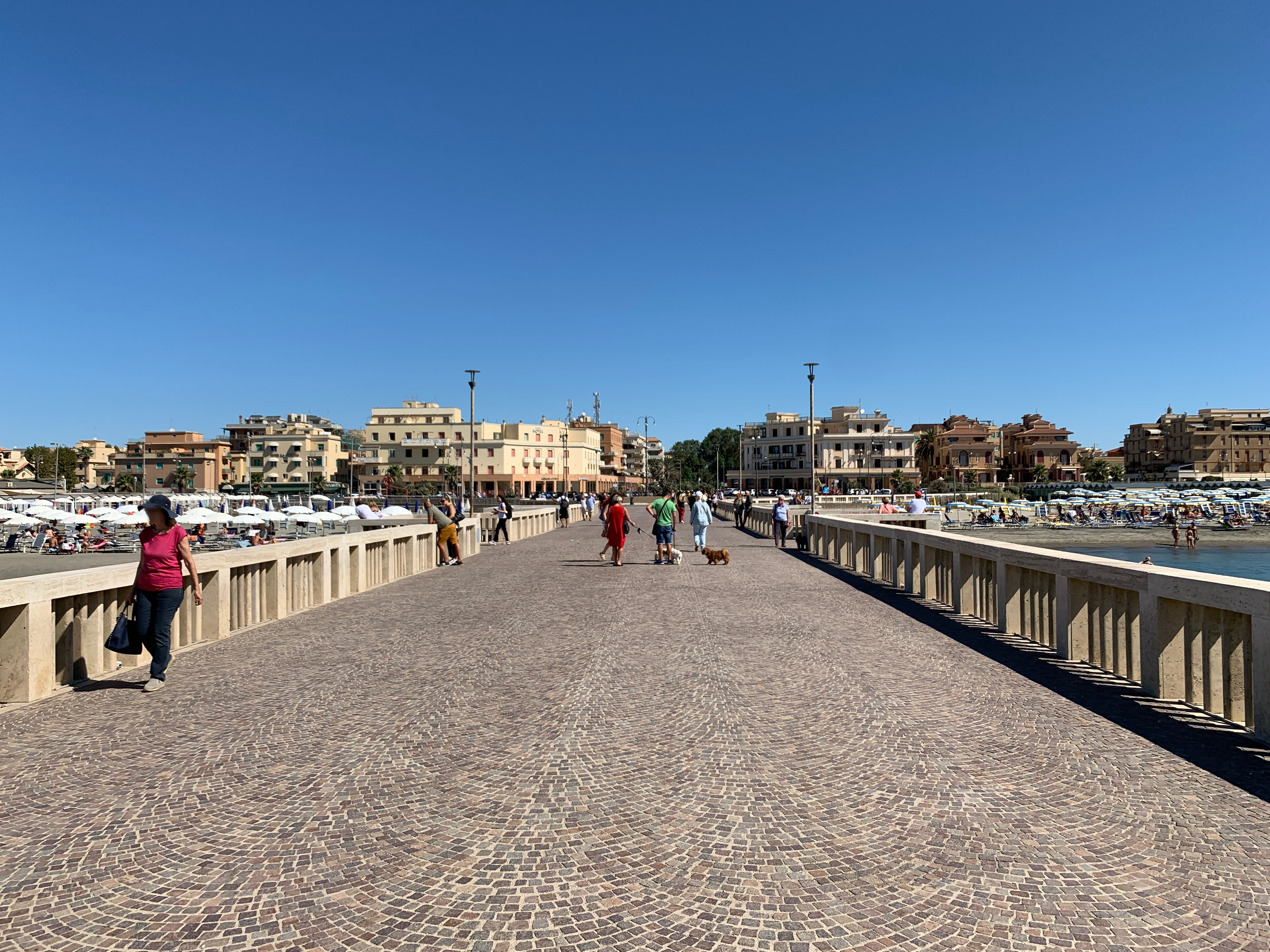
Pontile di Ostia, opened in 1940

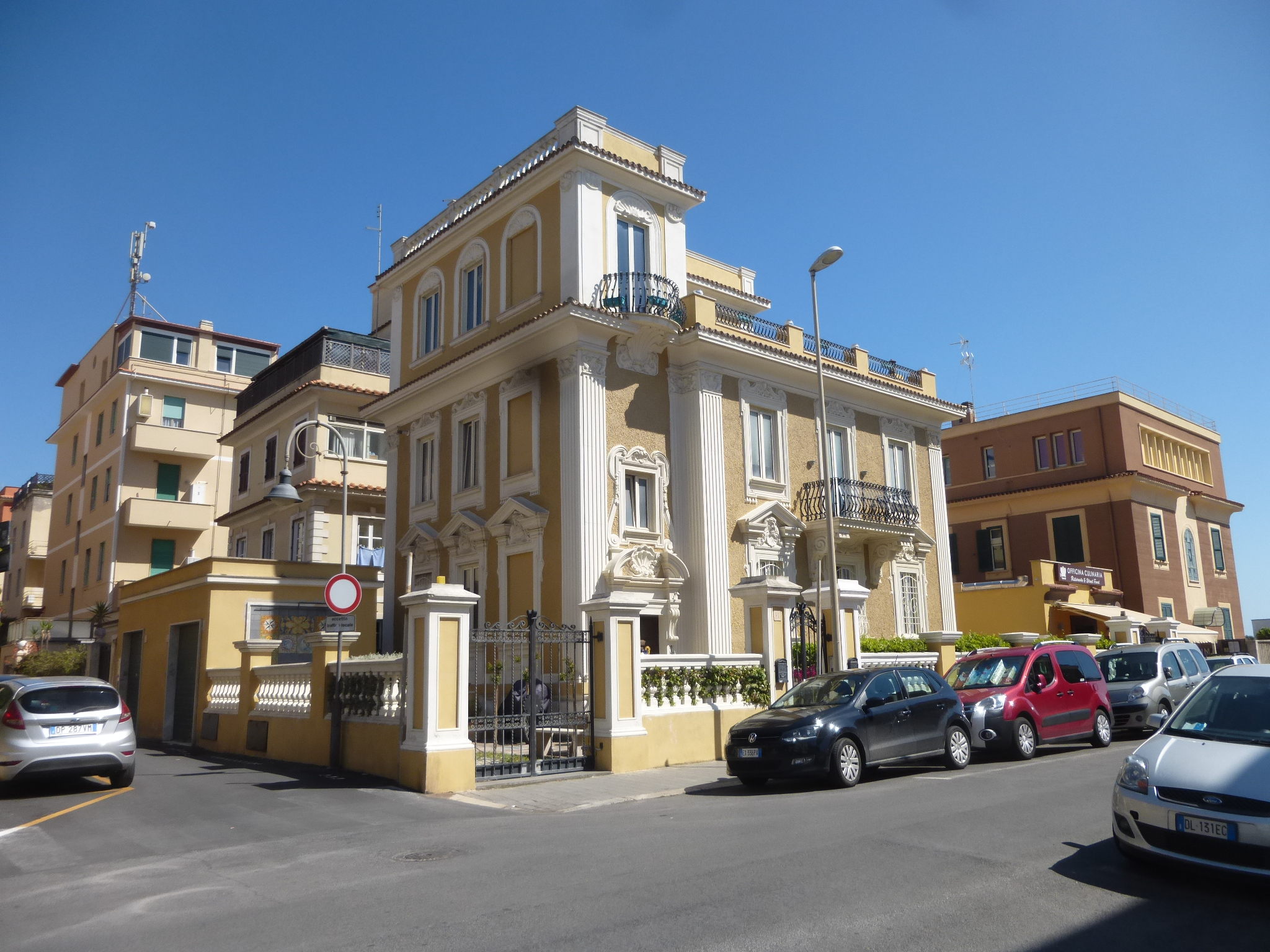
Historic houses in Ostia Lido

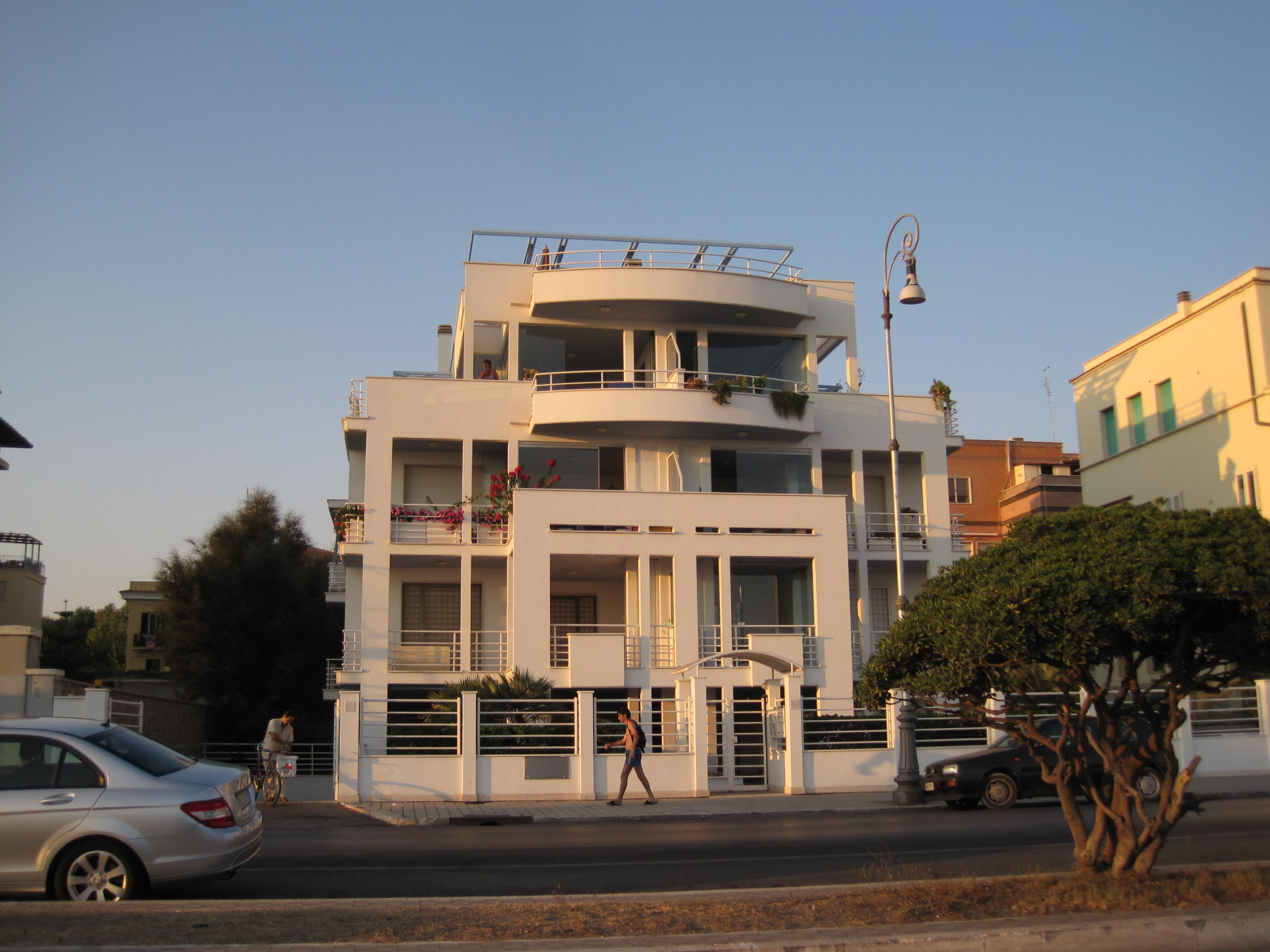
Rationalist style house in Ostia Lido

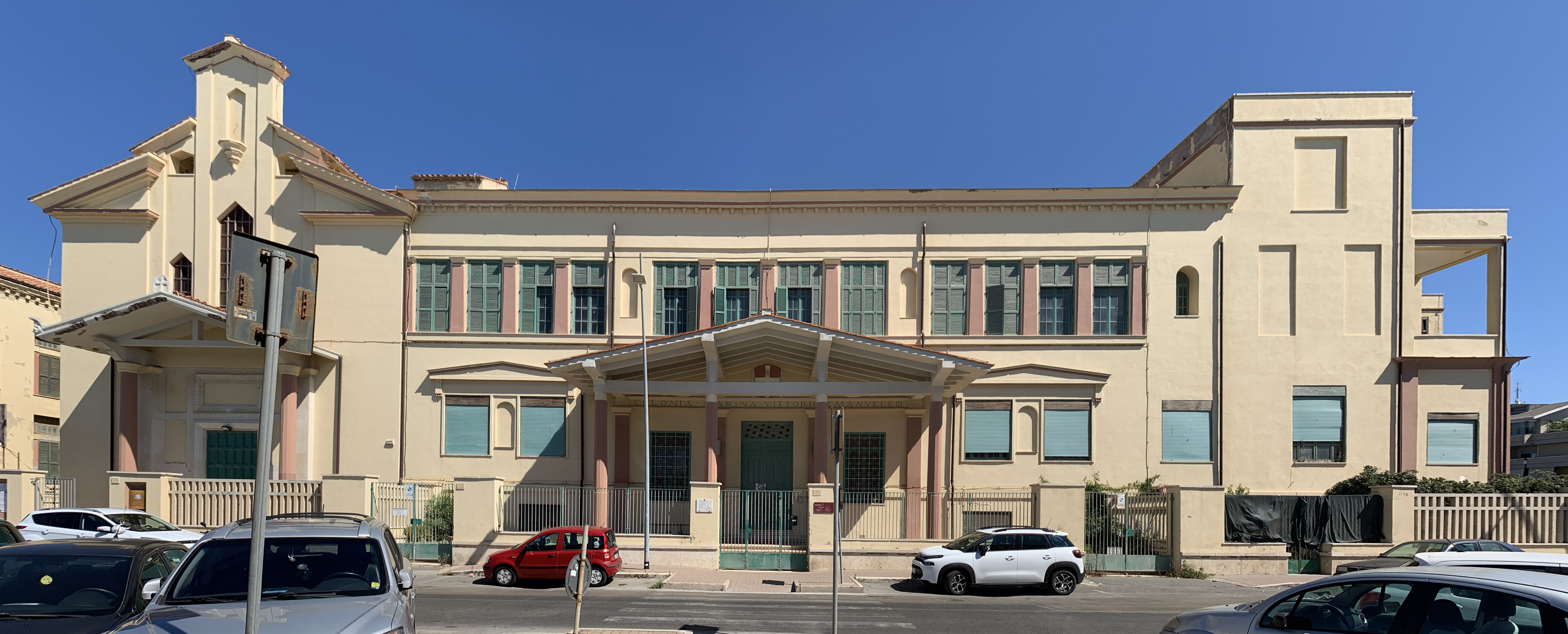
Typical 20th century Seaside Colony in Ostia Lido

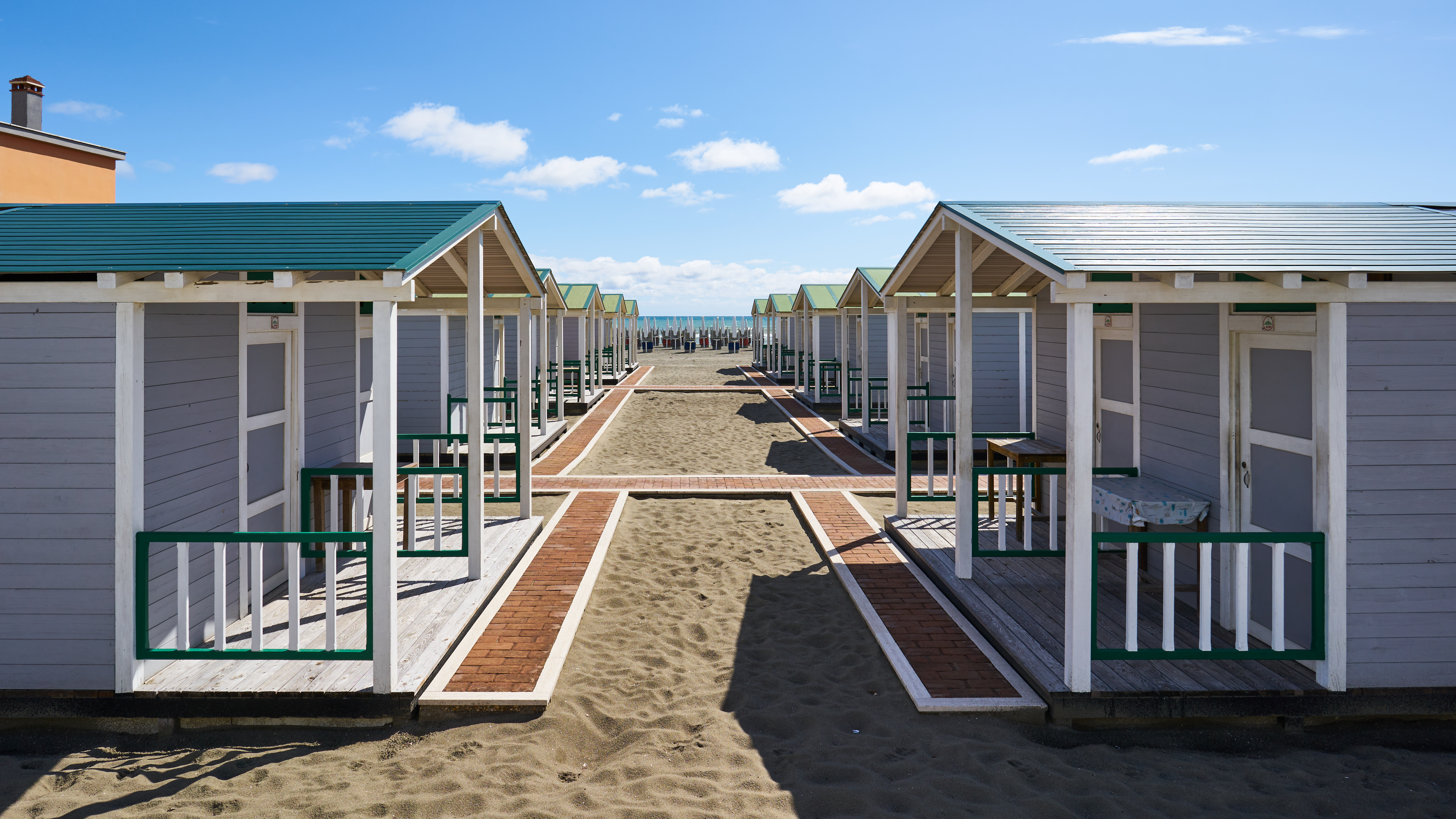
Modern beach huts in Ostia Lido

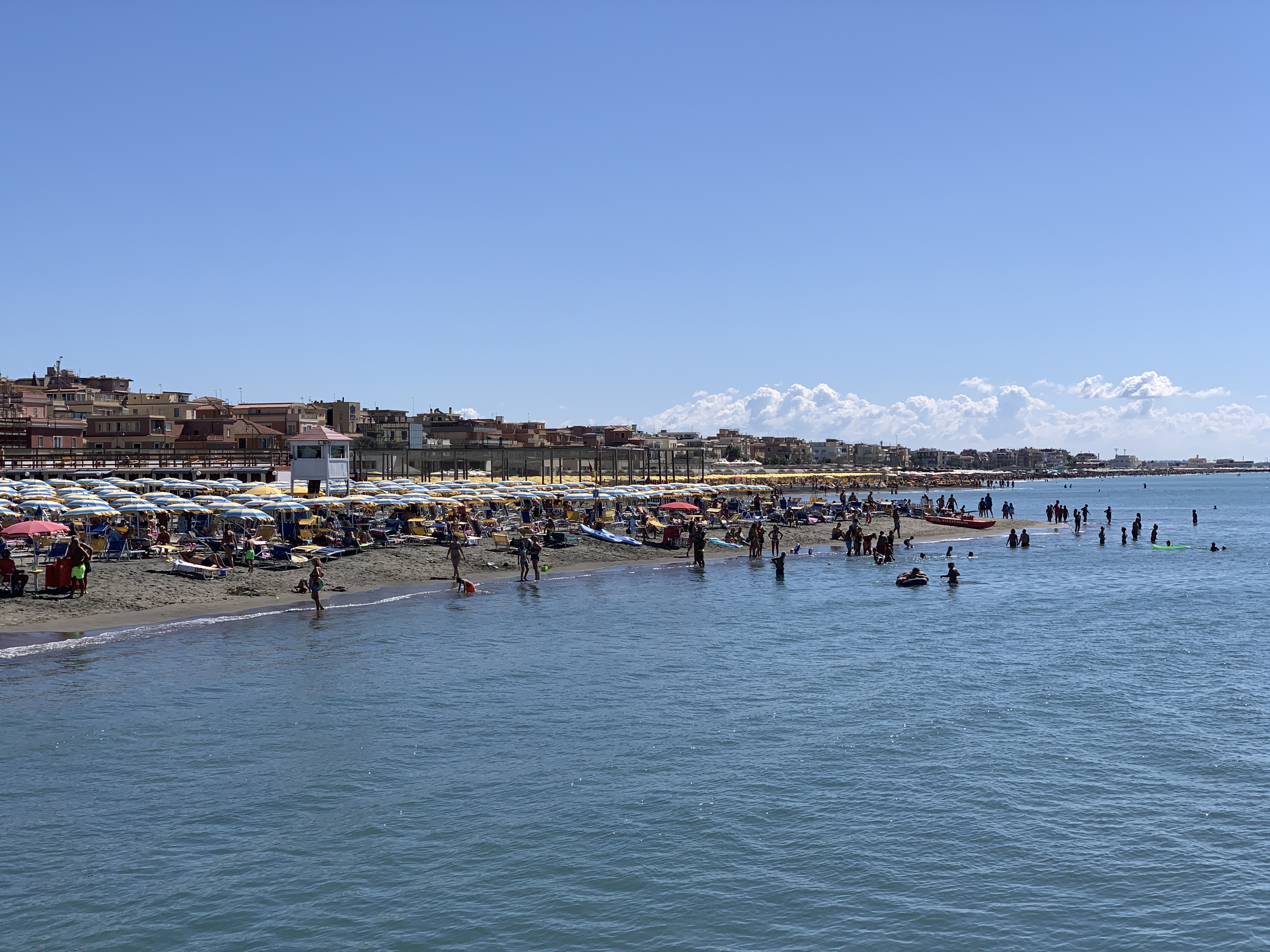
Ostia Lido beach

== Education ==
=== Upper secondary schools ===
The municipio hosts several prominent secondary education institutions serving the coastal and suburban districts of Rome, offering academic, technical, and vocational curricula:

==== Licei ====
- Liceo Scientifico Antonio Labriola – Located in Via Carlo del Greco (Ostia), it is the historic state scientific high school of the district, which also includes a Cambridge international track.
- Liceo Classico, Scientifico e Linguistico Anco Marzio – Headquartered in Via Capo Sperone (Ostia), offering classical, scientific, and linguistic tracks across multiple branches.
- Liceo Democrito – Located in Viale Claudio Gora (Casal Palocco), specializing in scientific and human sciences (scienze umane) studies.
- Liceo Federigo Enriques – Located in Via Francesco Donati (Ostia), offering scientific, linguistic, and artistic high school options.

==== Technical and Vocational Institutes ====
- Istituto Tecnico Industriale Michael Faraday – Located in Via Capo Sperone (Ostia), a major technological and industrial institute specializing in electronics, mechanics, and computer science.
- Istituto d'Istruzione Superiore Carlo Urbani – Located in Via dell'Idroscalo (Ostia), offering vocational curricula in hospitality, commercial services, and social care.
- Istituto Tecnico Trasporti e Logistica Marcantonio Colonna – Located in Via delle Sirene (Ostia), it is the historic nautical high school (Istituto Nautico) of Rome, specializing in maritime transport and logistics.
- Istituto d'Istruzione Superiore Giulio Verne – Located in Via di Saponara (Acilia), providing professional and technical training in arts, graphics, and multimedia communication.
- Istituto Tecnico Economico Paolo Toscanelli – Located in Via Claudio (Ostia), specializing in administration, marketing, finance, and tourism.

=== Higher education ===
In recent years, Municipio X has developed into a specialized hub for higher education, focusing heavily on marine engineering, cybersecurity, coastal environmental sciences, and elite national military and economic law enforcement training.

==== Public University Campuses ====
- Roma Tre University (Ostia Campus) – The university operates a major decentralized technological pole in Ostia, headquartered in the fully restored historic former Enalc Hotel complex in Via Bernardino da Monticastro. Known colloquially as the "University of the Sea" (Università del Mare), this campus hosts specialized degree programs and laboratories from the Departments of Engineering and Law, including:
  - Marine Engineering (Ingegneria del mare)
  - Sustainable Development of Coastal and Marine Environments
  - Cybersecurity masters and advanced research assets
- Sapienza University of Rome (Polo Ostia) – Sapienza maintains decentralized healthcare and medical training programs within the municipio, utilizing local clinical facilities such as the Grassi Hospital (Ospedale Giovan Battista Grassi) for degrees in Nursing and specialized medical internships.

==== Military and Law Enforcement Academies ====
- Guardia di Finanza Economic and Financial Police School (Scuola di Polizia Economico-Finanziaria) – Located in Via delle Fiamme Gialle (Ostia), it is the primary national postgraduate academy for the Guardia di Finanza. It serves as a world-renowned international training center specializing in advanced economic investigation, anti-money laundering, and financial crime suppression.

== Culture ==
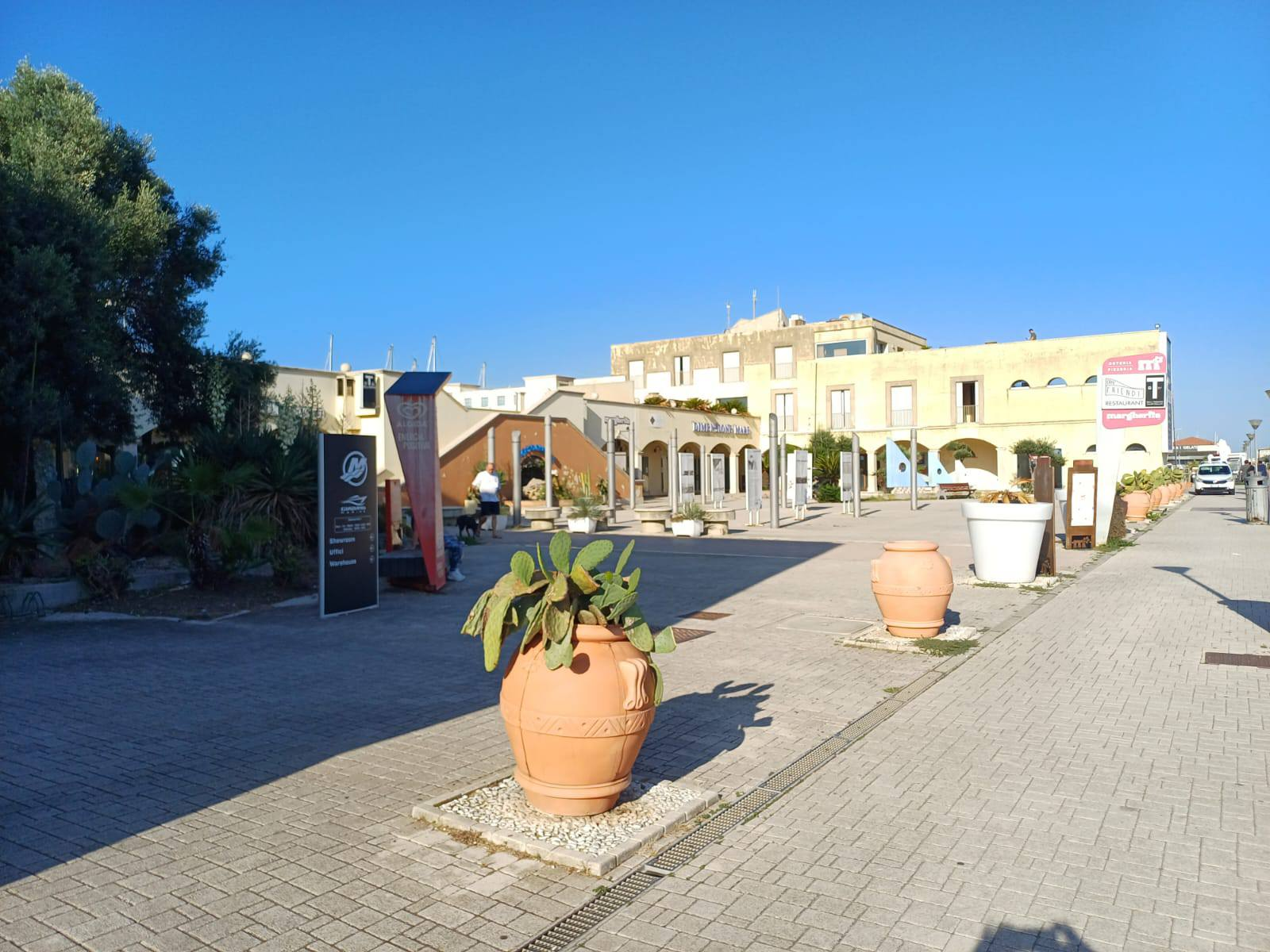
Elsa Morante public library.

=== Public libraries ===
The municipal library network of Rome (Biblioteche di Roma) operates several public libraries within Municipio X, serving as key cultural and educational hubs for both the coastal and inland residential quarters:

- Biblioteca Elsa Morante – Headquartered in Via Mare di Sotto (Ostia), near the coastline. It is the largest public library in the district, named after the prominent Italian novelist Elsa Morante. The center features extensive reading rooms, a dedicated children's section, and regular cultural exhibitions.
- Biblioteca Sandro Onofri – Located in Via Umberto Lilloni within the Acilia quarter. Named after the Roman writer and teacher Sandro Onofri, it serves as a vital cultural outpost for the inland residential expansion of the municipio.

== Transport ==
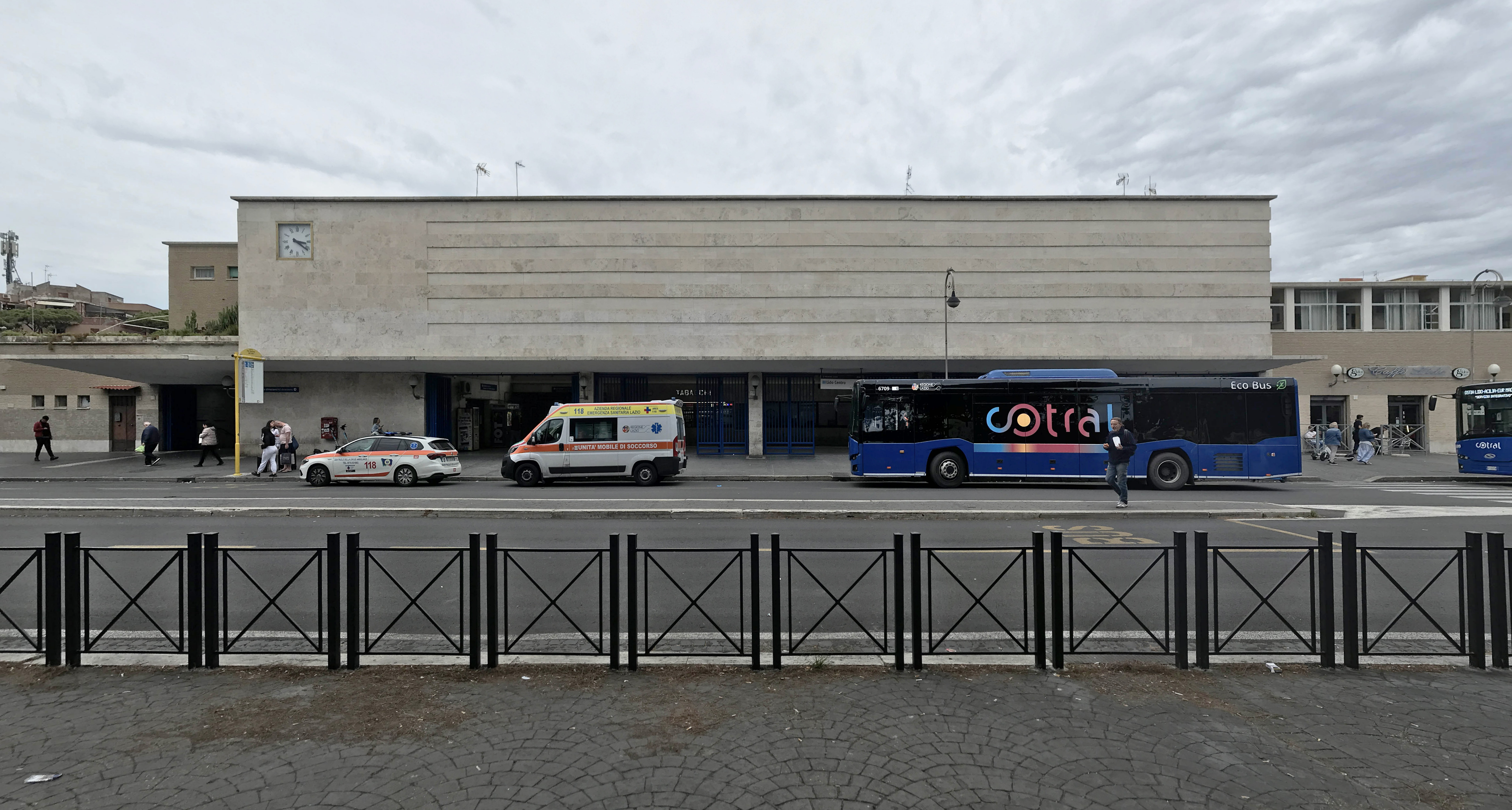
Lido di Ostia Centro station on the Rome–Lido railway.

The transportation network of Municipio X is designed to bridge the coastal and suburban residential quarters with central Rome, handling massive daily commuter flows alongside seasonal tourist traffic heading to the Ostia beaches.

=== Rail Networks ===
- Metromare (former Rome–Lido railway) – This vital regional rapid transit line runs entirely parallel to the Via Ostiense and Via Cristoforo Colombo, serving as the backbone of the municipio's public transport. It connects central Rome (from Roma Porta San Paolo station, adjacent to the Piramide Metro B station) to the coast, terminating at Cristoforo Colombo station. Major stations within the municipio include:
  - Acilia and Ostia Antica (serving the inland quarters and archaeological park).
  - Lido di Ostia Nord, Lido di Ostia Centro, and Stella Polare (serving the urban core of Ostia).

=== Road Infrastructure ===
The municipio is connected to the Grande Raccordo Anulare (GRA) and central Rome via three major parallel arterial roads:

- Via Cristoforo Colombo – A massive, high-capacity dual carriageway that connects Piazza Venezia and the EUR district directly to the seafront of Ostia (Piazzale Cristoforo Colombo).
- Via Ostiense (SS 8) – A historic road tracing the ancient Roman route along the left bank of the Tiber River, connecting the city center to Ostia Antica and the Lido.
- Via del Mare (SP 8) – Running immediately adjacent to Via Ostiense, it acts as a dedicated fast-lane infrastructure toward the coast.

=== Maritime and River Infrastructure ===
- Port of Rome (Porto Turistico di Roma) – Located in the Ostia Ponente area near the mouth of the Tiber, it is a modern tourist marina featuring 840 berths, commercial areas, and pedestrian promenades.

=== Cycling Routes ===
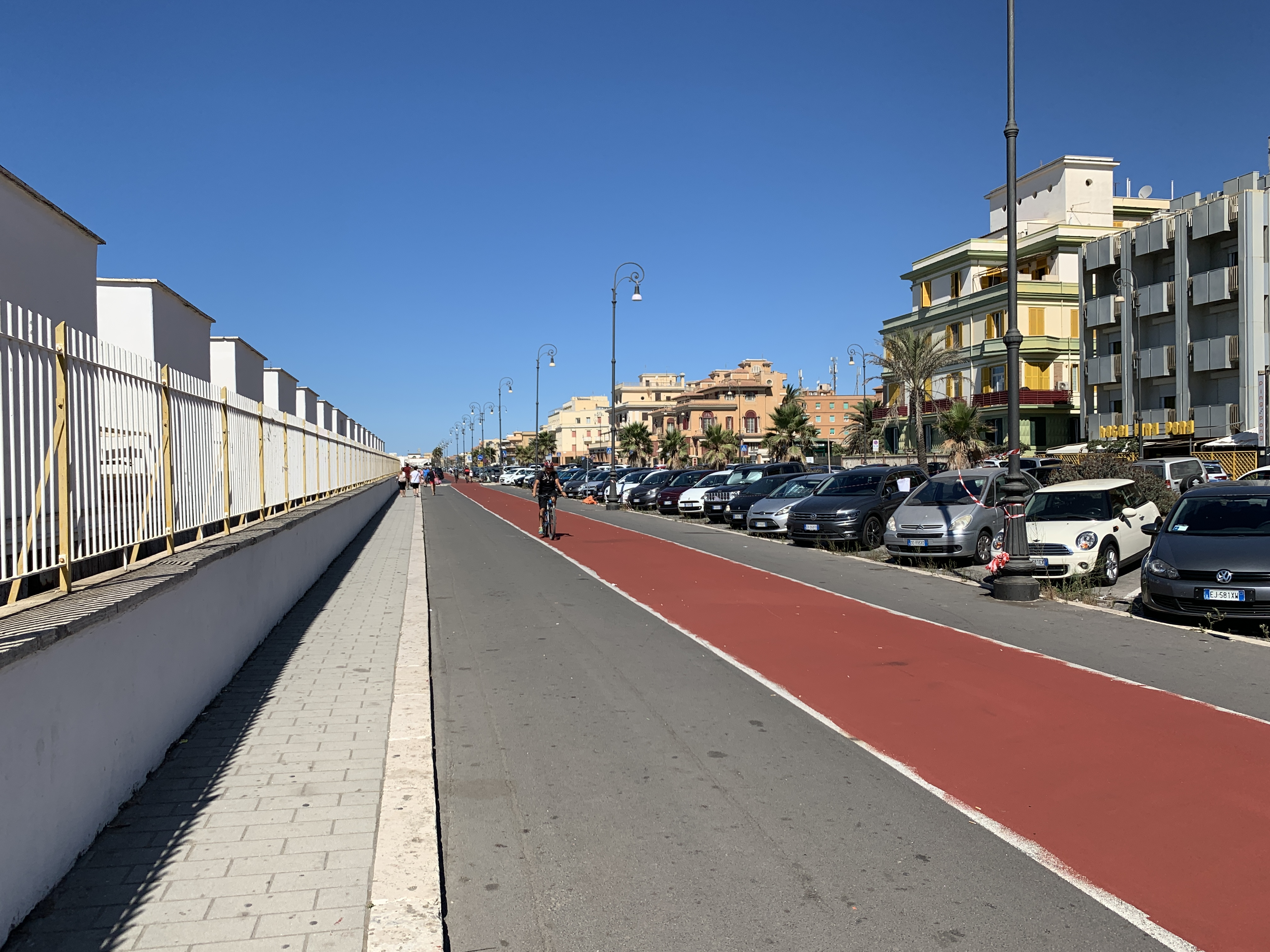
Ostia Lungomare Cycle Path, opened in 2020.

Due to its flat terrain and coastal geography, Municipio X hosts some of the most significant and panoramic cycling infrastructures in the metropolitan area of Rome:

- Sentiero Pasolini (Tiber Cycle Route) – A major dirt-and-gravel cycle path that traces the final stretch of the Tiber river. It enters the municipio near Malafede and passes through the medieval village of Ostia Antica, officially terminating near the river mouth in Fiumicino and Fiumara Grande. It forms the final section of the planned Grande Raccordo Anulare delle Bici (GRAB).
- Ostia Lungomare Cycle Path – A fully paved, bidirectional urban cycle track that runs directly parallel to the coastline along the Lungomare Paolo Toscanelli and Lungomare Duilio. It connects the Ostia Tourist Harbour (Porto Turistico) to the central beaches, promoting sustainable mobility and sea-view recreational cycling.
- Castel Fusano Cycling Network – A system of paved and unpaved cycle paths crossing the Castelfusano Pinewood Urban Park. The most prominent axis is the track running alongside the historic Via Severiana, connecting the urban core of Ostia to the protected dunes of Capocotta and the presidential estate boundaries.
