= Feronia (Etruria) =

Ancient city in Etruria

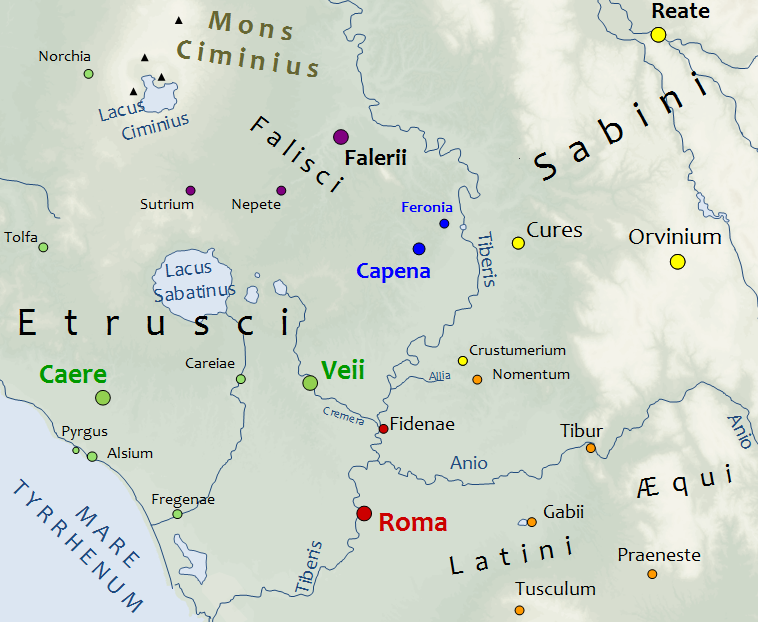
Map of Latium 400 BC

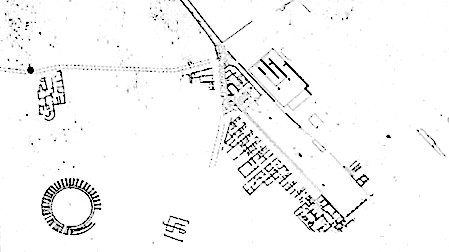
Feronia plan showing the forum with the sanctuary on its northeastern side

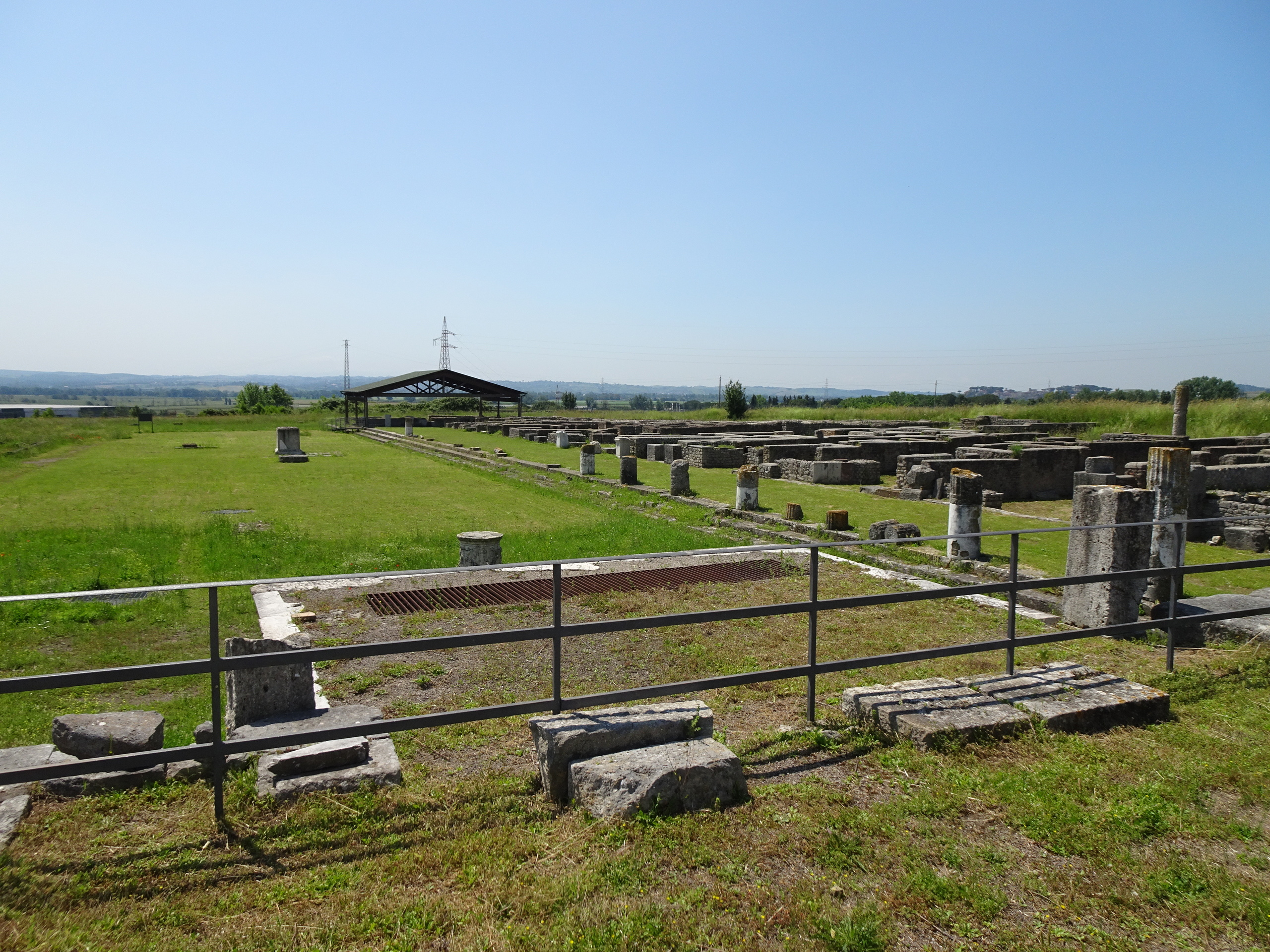
Feronia forum, view from the basilica podium

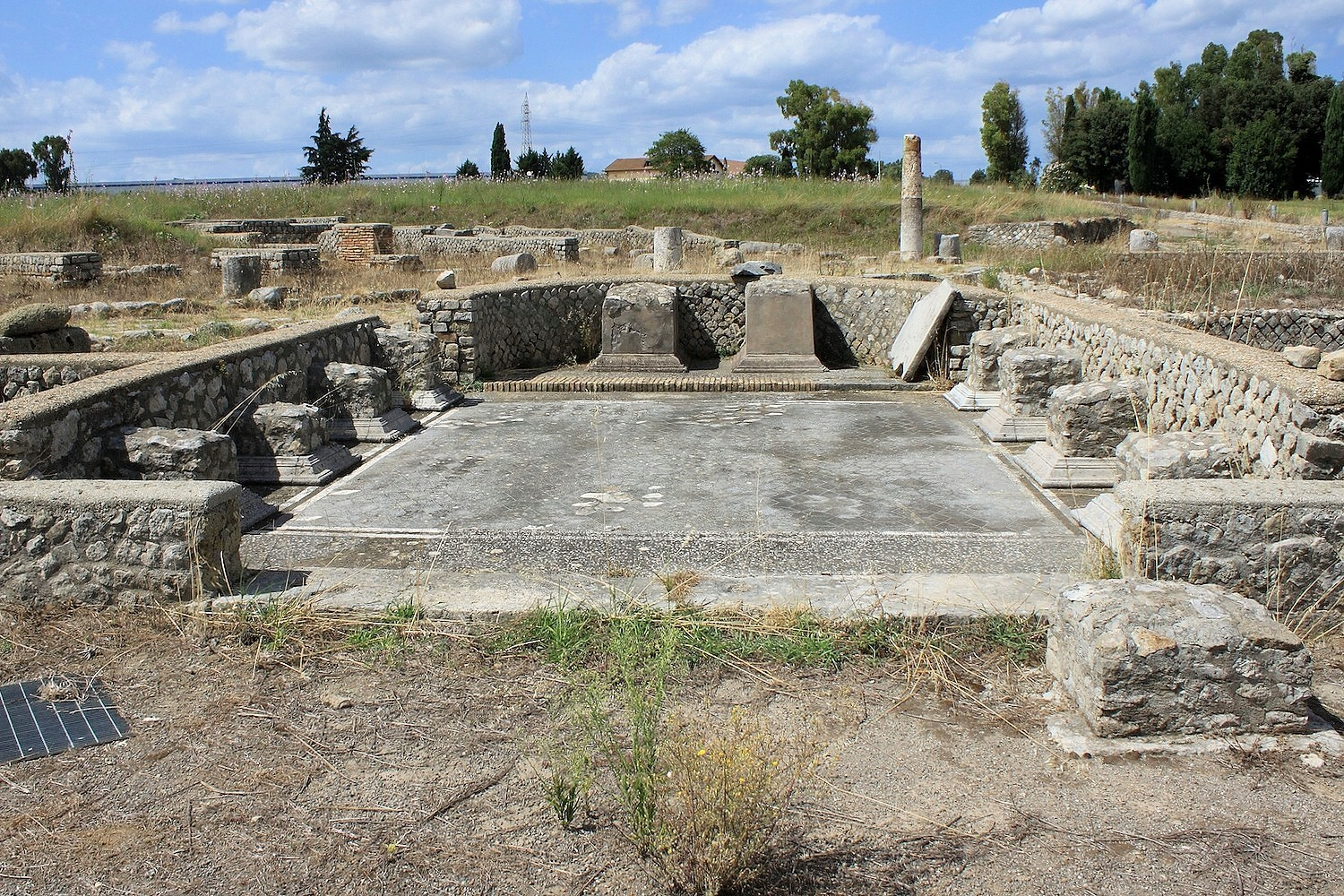
The Augusteum

Feronia or Lucus Feroniae (Φερωνία, Strabo; Λοῦκος Φηρωνίας, Ptolemy) was an ancient Roman municipium border the present Via Tiberina and Autostrada A1, current Comune of Capena near the present town of Fiano Romano. It is located in the plain along the Tiber Valley, at the foot of Mount Soracte, and was within the ancient territory of Capena. It began as a sanctuary called Lucus Feroniae in the time of Tullus Hostilius (r.672–640 BC) when it was located in Etruria.

It was partially excavated when the A1 Rome-Milan motorway which crosses it was built, and the archaeological site is adjacent to that of the ancient Roman Villa dei Volusii.

== History ==
Excavations from 1952 show that the town developed around the archaic sanctuary of Lucus Feroniae as a meeting centre and famous market. It was located at an obvious communications centre between the Latin, Cures Sabine, Etruscan and Faliscan territories, near the Tiber and Via Tiberina and at the start of the routes to the Picena and Teramo-Aquilana regions, the future via Salaria and via Caecilia.

Archaeology at the beginning of the 1970s led to the identification of buildings which were related to the forum and were in use during the second half of the 3rd c. BC.

Strabo is the only author who mentions a town of the name, which he calls Feronia; other writers speak of Lucus Feroniae and Feroniae fanum.

It is natural that in process of time a town should have grown up around a site of so much sanctity, and which was annually visited by a great concourse of persons. Feronia appears to have been a Sabine goddess, and hence the festivals at her shrine seem to have been attended especially by the Sabines, though the sanctuary itself was in the Etruscan territory, and dependent upon the neighbouring city of Capena The first mention of these annual festivals occurs as early as the reign of Tullus Hostilius, when we find them already frequented by great numbers of people, not only for religious objects, but as a kind of fair for the purposes of trade, a custom which seems to have prevailed at all similar meetings.

Great wealth had, in the course of ages, been accumulated at the shrine of Feronia, and this tempted Hannibal to make a digression from his march during his retreat from Rome, in 211 BC, for the purpose of plundering the temple. On this occasion he despoiled it of all its gold and silver, amounting to a large sum, besides which there was a large quantity of rude or uncoined brass, a sufficient proof of the antiquity of the sanctuary. The only other notices of the spot which occur in history are some casual mentions of prodigies that occurred there; but Strabo tells that it was still much frequented in his time, and that many persons came thither to see the miracle of the priests and votaries of the goddess passing unharmed through a fire and over burning cinders. This superstition is ascribed by other writers to the temple of Apollo, on the summit of Mount Soracte. It was probably transferred from thence to the more celebrated sanctuary at its foot.

In the 2nd c. BC the town underwent considerable development with the start of a rectangular town plan and housing blocks (insulae).

Pliny mentions a Lucus Feroniae among the colonies of the interior of Etruria and from the order in which he describes the towns of that province, there can be little doubt that he means the celebrated locality of the name in southern Etruria. But it is singular that Ptolemy, who also notices a Lucus Feroniae, to which he gives the title of a colonia, places it in the northwest extremity of Etruria, between the Arnus (modern Arno) and the Macra. No other notice occurs of any such place in this part of Etruria; and the Liber Coloniarum, though unusually copious in its description of the province of Tuscia, mentions no such colony at all. An inscription, on the other hand, in which we find the name of Colonia Julia Felix Lucoferonensis refers probably to the southern Etruscan town, and on the whole it is more probable that the name should have been altogether misplaced by Ptolemy, than that there should have existed a second colony of the name, of which we know nothing.

=== Colonia Julia Felix Lucus Feroniae ===
In 46 BC Julius Caesar passed a law for the redistribution of state land which was enacted after 44 BC under the triumvirate, including the territory of Capena. Archaeology has shown that the Colonia Julia Felix Lucus Feroniae was founded for army veterans at this time starting with the forum area built over the earlier town and with an orthogonal city plan. The town was separated from the sanctuary, which had been destroyed, by a wall. The cult of Feronia was abolished and replaced by that of Salus Frigifera to whom a small temple was built at the end of the forum.

The colony was already partly built around the forum when Augustus (r. 27 BC - 14 AD) initiated many enhancements and new buildings including the aqueduct, basilica and amphitheatre. The shops in the forum were restored and an equestrian statue of M. Volusius Saturninus, friend of the emperor, patron of the town, and owner of the neighbouring villa-estate, was erected in the forum. Tiberius continued with building monuments including the Augusteum. The numerous honorary inscriptions in the Forum testify to a flourishing life from the Julio-Claudian age to the Flavian age up to 266 AD.

Trajan (r.98 - 117) restored much of the town and built the forum baths and two small temples in the sanctuary. The last building works date to the 4th c. when housing blocks were enlarged and renovated and houses were built on the via Tiberina near the amphitheatre.

The town seems to have been abandoned at start of the 5th century.

== The site ==
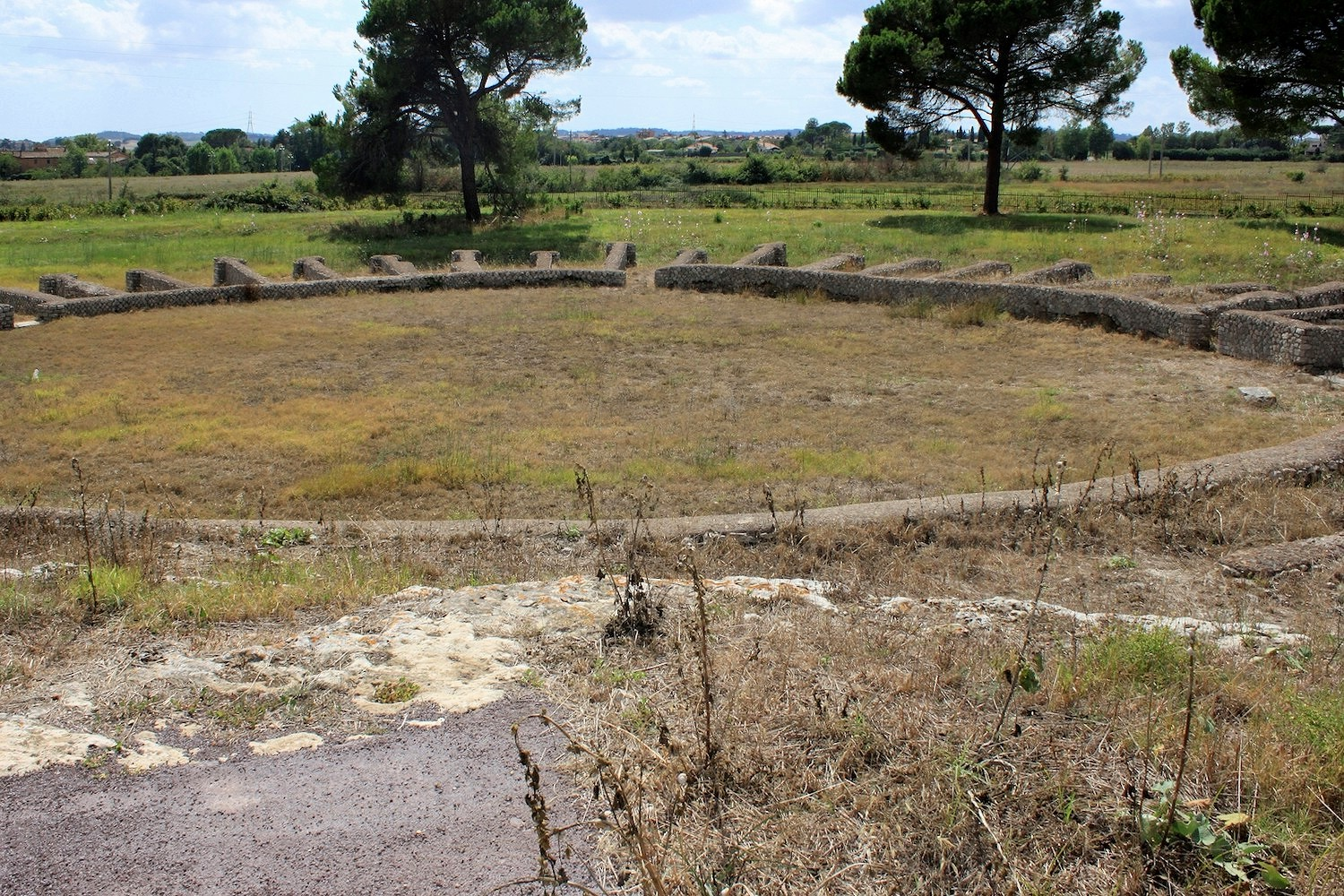
The amphitheatre

Two roads crossed the town, the via Tiberina and the via Capenate from Feronia to Capena.

Several residential areas have been brought to light and are organised in distinct blocks, aligned with the axis of the later forum, these extend to occupy the area south-west and below the portico and the adjacent tabernae of the late republican forum. They include a beautiful domus of the 2nd c. AD with a series of emblematic polychrome mosaics and had been preceded by republican phases with opus signinum floors. The orientation of the urban layout indicate its clear connection with the sacred area surrounding the Temple of Feronia adjacent to the forum, which had one of the main entrances at this point, preserved almost unchanged in the radical restructuring that the site underwent at the time of the establishment of the Roman colony.

The amphitheatre is the smallest in the Roman Empire with a capacity of about 5000 people. It was financed by a freedman, M. Silius Epaphroditus, with his own money.

There was also a theatre and a Temple to Hercules mentioned on an inscription but yet to be found, a schola or large hall with a beautiful opus sectile floor (1st century AD) and the Villa dei Volusii.

A magnificent mausoleum was found nearby in Fiano Romano, sculptures from which are now in the museum.

=== The sanctuary ===
Inscriptions show that the sanctuary or lucus of Feronia lay behind the eastern wall of the forum and was accessible through a small portico built in the early Augustan period by the duumvir A. Ottavius who also reconstructed the forum.

=== The forum ===
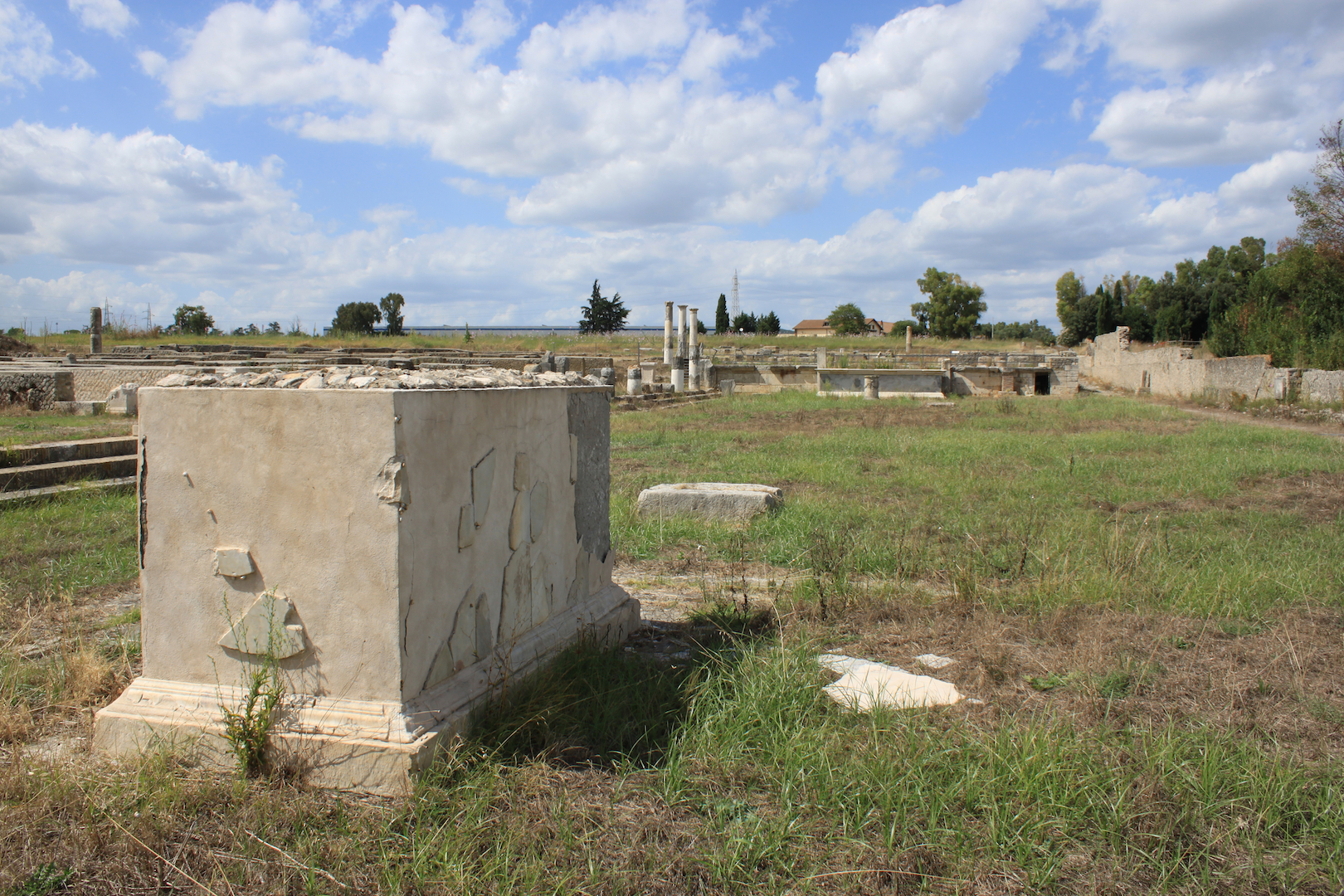
Forum and equestrian statue base

The first of the forum buildings date from the second half of the 1st c. BC and lay on top of the Hellenistic town. long rectangular Roman Forum was bordered on the north end by a sacred terrace with a basilica for law-courts and traders, and behind that the temple of Salus Frugifera, a sacellum of the Augustales and the late-Tiberian Augusteum which formed a monumental backdrop. A colonnaded portico borders the Forum on the western side, on which tabernae (shops) open, some of which are paved with mosaics, while at the entrance of others is a sort of ideogram of the activity of the trader, a sort of ancient advertising sign.

On the eastern side is the enclosure wall of the sanctuary of Feronia on top of which were channels and lead pipes from the Aqua Augusta aqueduct in the Augustan era, mentioned in inscriptions.

At the centre of the Forum was a series of altars and statues including 2 equestrian statues, one of M. Volusius Saturninus, friend of the emperor, patron of the town and owner of the neighbouring villa-estate.

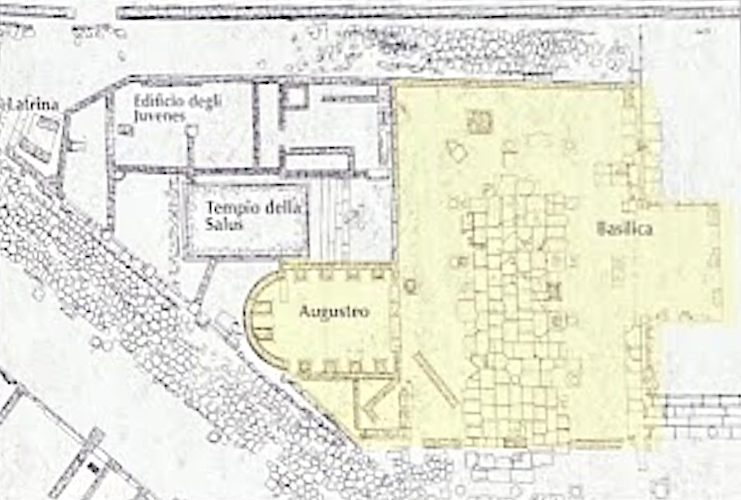
Feronia basilica plan

=== The basilica and Augusteum ===
The basilica was built under Augustus and had a porticoed courtyard housing statues and honorary inscriptions. Under Tiberius the apsidal sacellum (small shrine) became an Augusteum in 14-20 AD and the staircase was blocked. The Augusteum was paved in colourful marble (opus sectile) and contained 12 statues. The basilica was repaved under Trajan.

=== The forum baths ===
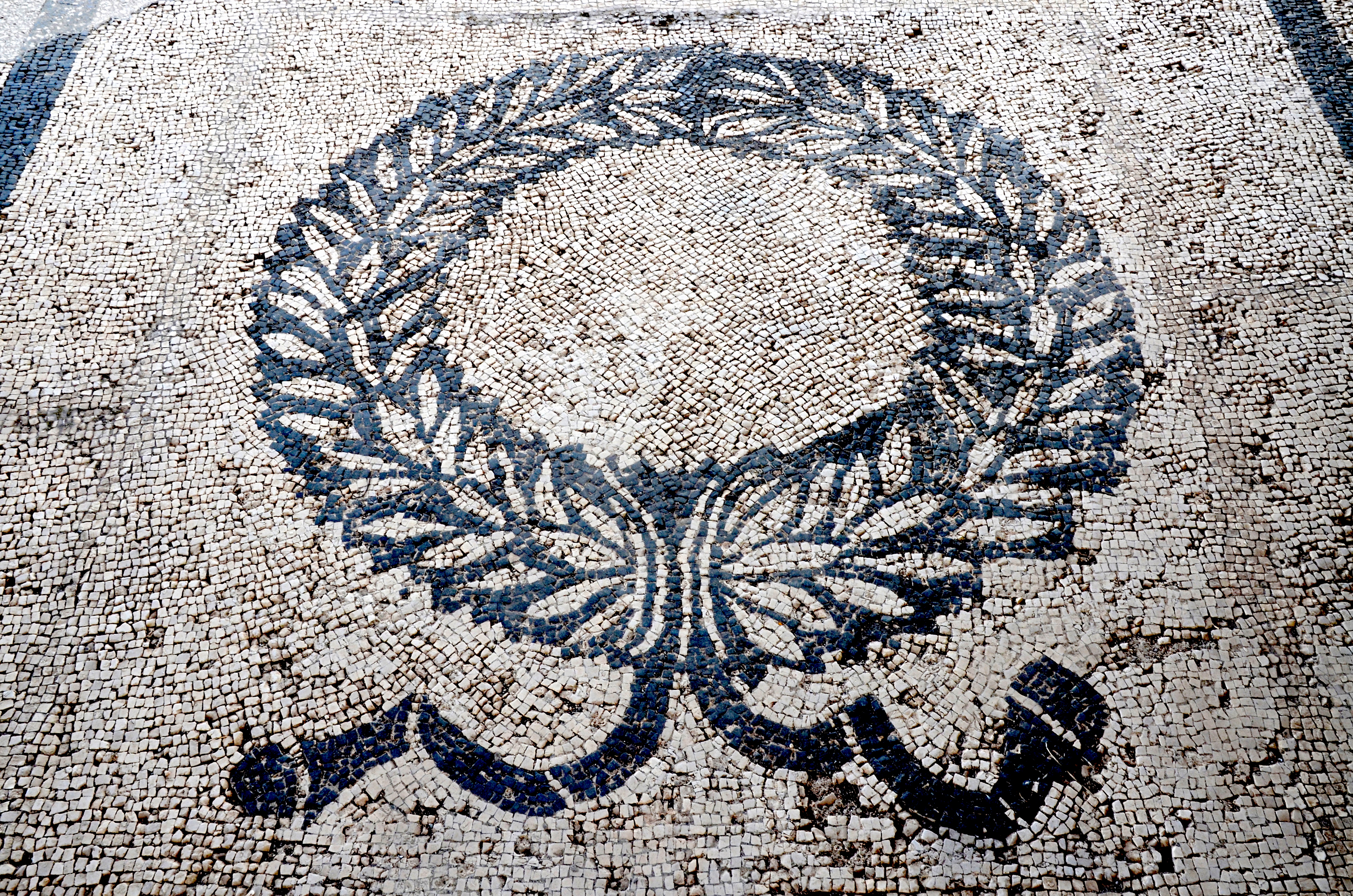
Mosaic, forum baths

These are the largest baths discovered in the town, excavated in the 1970s. They were built over a housing block (insula) next to the forum. Floors were paved with monochrome mosaics, one with a laurel wreath motif in the centre. In the 5th century a church was built in the atrium. They had a separate, smaller women's section with only a frigidarium and a calidarium. Brick stamps show that repairs were done under Emperor Caracalla (r. 198-217) and some partly coloured mosaic panels were possibly added then.

=== The baths on the via Capenate ===
This is the only building on the Roman via Capenate that has been completely excavated. These thermal baths were built under Trajan (r. 98-117) over an earlier house with shop (taberna) that was isolated in an undeveloped urban area. The suite of rooms included marble-lined internal walls. It was restored in the 4th century with opus vittatum.
