= Mausoleum of Fiano Romano =

Roman Empire funerary art in Rome

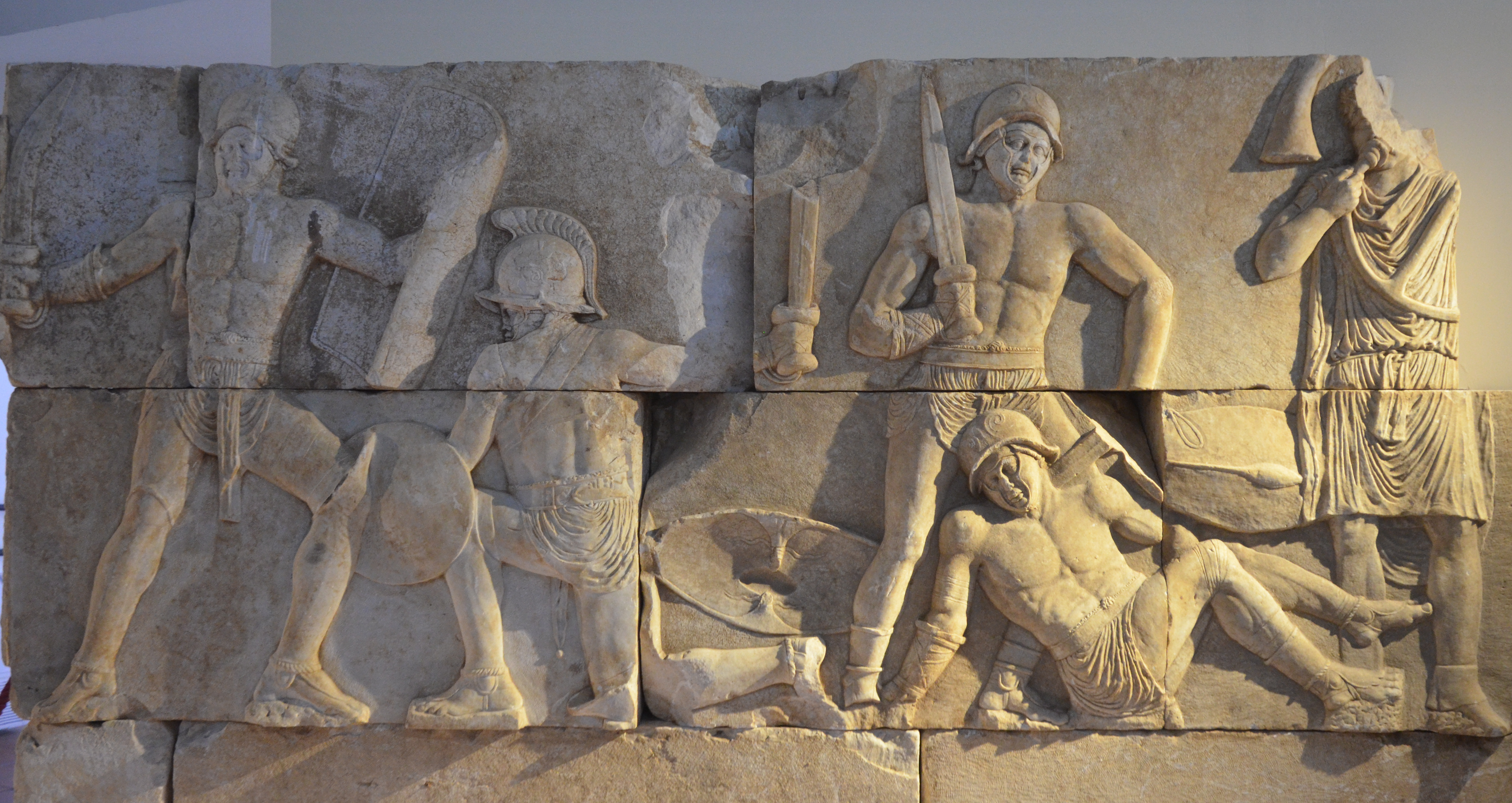
Mausoleum of Fiano Romano in the antiquarium of Lucus Feroniae.

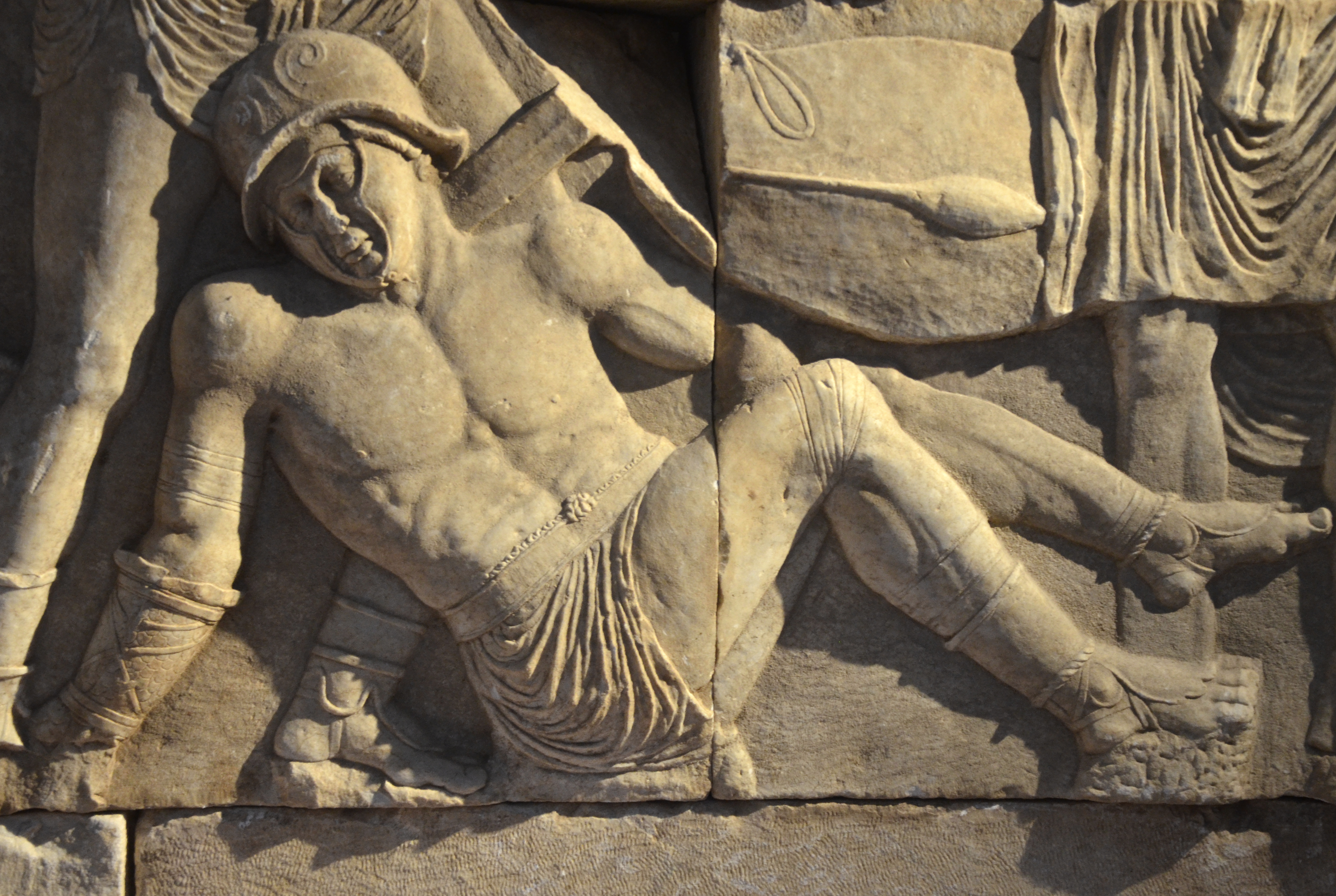
Detail of funerary gladiator relief

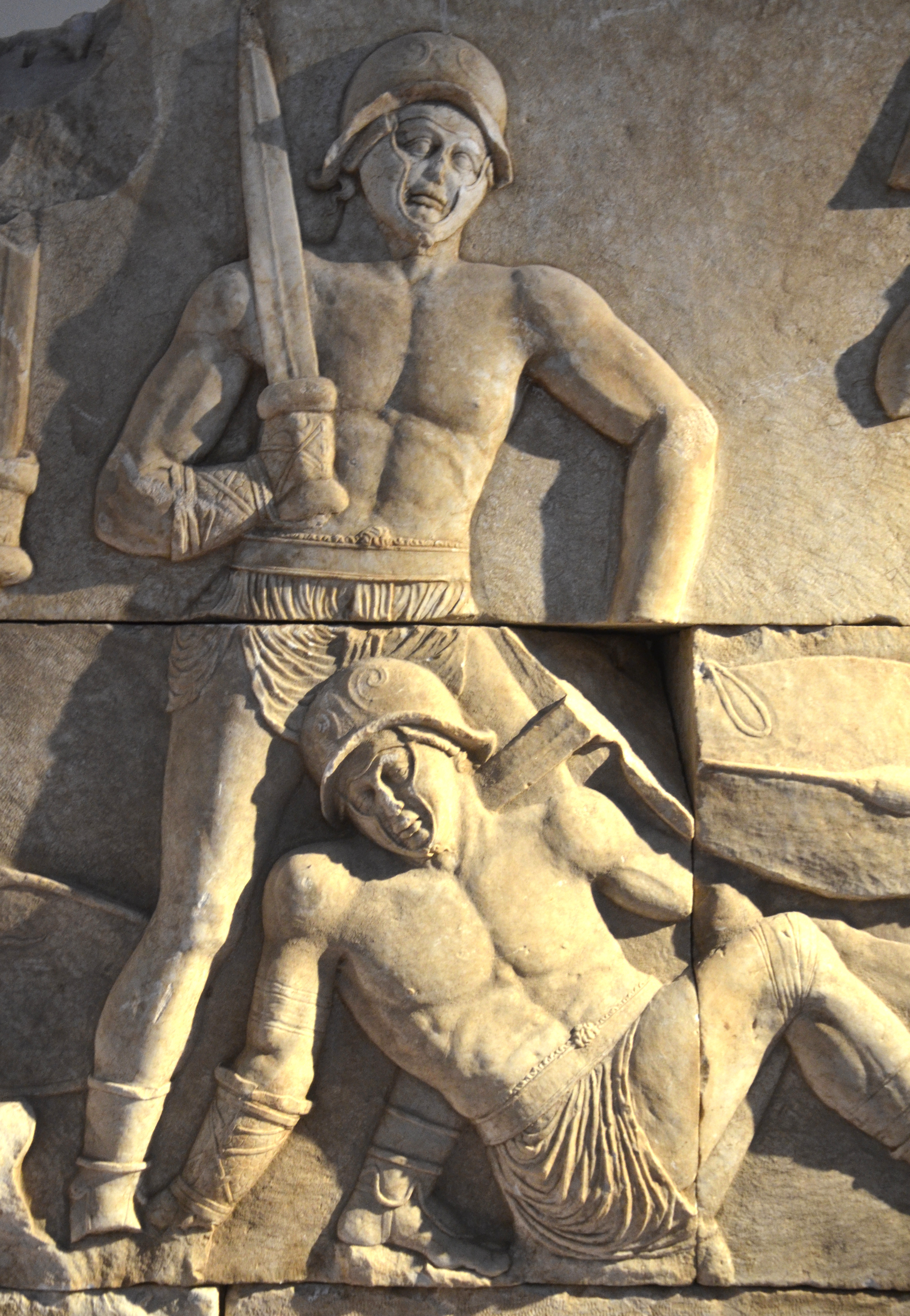
Detail of funerary gladiator relief

The Mausoleum of Fiano Romano (Italian: Mausoleo di Fiano Romano) is a set of thirteen large blocks of Carrara marble decorated in relief of the 1st century BC, approximately 0.60 metres (2.0 ft) x 1.00 metre (3.28 ft) x 0.30 metres (0.98 ft), with scenes of Gladiator fights that originally decorated three sides of an imposing funerary monument tower.

== Discovery ==
In January 2007, an operation by the Carabinieri Command for the Protection of Cultural Heritage (T.P.C.) in partnership with the Guardia di Finanza and coordinated by the Public Prosecutor's Office of Rome led to the recovery in a private plot of land in Fiano Romano of twelve blocks of marble worked in relief, hidden under a modest layer of topsoil and neatly arranged next to each other.

The finds had been found by chance, perhaps even for over sixteen years, during construction works but the discoverers instead of informing the competent authorities had thought of trying to resell them abroad on the clandestine market for works of art, for an initial price that it is thought to have been around 10 billion lire at the time (over 5 million euros).

Together with the blocks, but simply stacked close to them, the lower part of a toga statue, remains of an inscription and numerous elements of frames and decorations were also found.

The news of the discovery, considered immediately very important, was given by the then Vice President of the Council of Ministers and Minister of Cultural Heritage and Activities, Francesco Rutelli, in a meeting with the press at the National Etruscan Museum of Villa Giulia who define it "an extraordinary find".

The subsequent excavations in the area of the discovery, carried out in 2007 by the cultural heritage's office (Sovrintendenza archeologica per l'Etruria Meridionale), allowed to find the base of the imposing tower funerary monument, which according to the inscriptions belonged to a Roman magistrate, on which they were fixed originally the blocks. Furthermore, the fact that part of the base of the sepulcher was made up of splinters from the blocks themselves confirmed that the blocks were worked directly on site.

The ministry, in compliance with the line of keeping the works in the area of origin, immediately decided to place the blocks in the antiquarium of the archaeological site of Lucus Feroniae, a choice that, given the importance of the artwork, did not fail to raise concerns.

In 2018 the Carabinieri T.P.C. managed to recover a further block of the mausoleum, becoming aware of its sale on the foreign market and thus recovering it in the Netherlands.

== Description ==
The blocks decorated three sides of a large tower-like funerary monument, whose remains were found near where the blocks were originally found.

Along the blocks are depicted in relief, without interruption and according to well-attested models, episodes of combat involving six pairs of gladiators, while in the background there are players.

The missing parts do not allow a precise evaluation of the scene represented but various elements, such as weapons and clothes, suggest a single subject depicted in the various episodes.

In particular, in the best preserved blocks it is possible to observe:

- at the end of the central side is represented one of the gladiators, now fallen to the ground, overwhelmed by the opponent who presses his foot on the hand of the enemy who still holds a short curved sword and, having abandoned the shield, raises his left arm in the gesture of the missio (request for pardon);
- on the right side there is a gladiator with one knee on the ground who lowers the shield still holding the sword in his rear right hand, while the opponent stops his impetus and turns his gaze awaiting the final verdict of the editor (organizer of the games);
- at the extremity of the right side a dying gladiator is represented, fallen to the ground and with the oblong shield now definitively abandoned.

The dynamism of the scenes, their realism, the plasticism of the figures, the strong pathos transmitted, the very high quality of the material used and above all of the realization of the relief suggest that it was produced by a leading workshop of the time, capable of engaging in a complex narrative but at the same time cared for down to the smallest detail.

It is estimated that the relief may have been made in the third quarter of the 1st century BC (i.e. between 50 and 25 BC), on the eve of the principality of Augustus.

== Bibliography ==
- "Press release - Rilievo Gladiatorio di Fiano Romano" (in Italian). MiBAC — Minister of Cultural Heritage and Activities. 2007-01-24.
- Hall, Ken (2007). "Ancient marble relief discovered near Rome". Antiques & Collecting Magazine. 112 (2): 27–29.
- Ylomans, Sarah; Merola, Marco (2007). "Victorious Gladiators - Sculptures from a first-century b.c. tomb escape the clutches of looters". Archaeology. 60 (5): 9–68.
