= Umbonia gens =

Ancient Roman family

The gens Umbonia was an obscure plebeian family at ancient Rome. This gens is perhaps best known from Umbonius Silo, governor of Hispania Baetica in AD 44, but several others are known from inscriptions.

== Origin ==
The nomen Umbonius belongs to a large class of gentilicia, chiefly of plebeian origin, formed from cognomina ending in -o. The root of the name would seem to be umbo, referring to an elbow, or the boss of a shield, and belonging either to a type of surname derived from a person's physical features, or from another derived from the names of everyday objects.

== Praenomina ==
The only praenomina known to have been used by the Umbonii are Lucius and Gaius, the two most common names throughout all periods of Roman history.

== Branches and cognomina ==
Several of the inscriptions of this family are from Roman colonies in the provinces of Africa Proconsularis and Numidia.

== Members ==
This list includes abbreviated praenomina. For an explanation of this practice, see filiation.

- Umbonia, mentioned in an inscription from Lilybaeum in Sicily, dating from the latter half of the third century BC.
- Lucius Umbonius, mentioned in an inscription from Lilybaeum, dating from the latter half of the third century BC.
- Gaius Umbonius C. f. Bassus, one of the municipal duumvirs at Lucus Feroniae in Etruria, at some point in the last quarter of the first century BC.
- Umbonia C. l. Zosima, a freedwoman named in an inscription from Rome, dating from the early or mid-first century.
- Umbonius Silo, governor of Hispania Baetica in AD 44, during the reign of Claudius, was expelled from the Roman Senate, ostensibly for failing to provide adequate grain to the soldiers in Mauretania, but in fact because he had offended some freedmen.
- Lucius Umbonius Varus, named in an inscription from Ostia in Latium, dating from the early third century.
- Umbonius Mannachius, a senator honored at Aeclanum in Samnium during the latter half of the fourth century.

=== Undated Umbonii ===
- Umbonius Fuscus, named in an inscription from Carthage in Africa Proconsularis.
- Umbonius Juvas, a man of senatorial rank at Cirta in Numidia.
- Gaius Umbonius Saturninus, dedicated a tomb at Lambaesis in Numidia to his mother, Tiberia Catula, aged eighty-five.
- Umbonia Secundula, buried at Carthage, aged twenty-eight years, seven months, along with her son, Aurelius Felix, aged four years, two months, and ten days, in a tomb built by her husband, also named Felix.
- Gaius Umbonius Tauriscus, dedicated a tomb at Rome to his wife, Numitoria, the freedwoman of Hilarus.

== See also ==
- List of Roman gentes

== Bibliography ==
- Lucius Cassius Dio Cocceianus (Cassius Dio), Roman History.
- Theodor Mommsen et alii, Corpus Inscriptionum Latinarum (The Body of Latin Inscriptions, abbreviated CIL), Berlin-Brandenburgische Akademie der Wissenschaften (1853–present).
- René Cagnat et alii, L'Année épigraphique (The Year in Epigraphy, abbreviated AE), Presses Universitaires de France (1888–present).
- George Davis Chase, "The Origin of Roman Praenomina", in Harvard Studies in Classical Philology, vol. VIII, pp. 103–184 (1897).
- Paul von Rohden, Elimar Klebs, & Hermann Dessau, Prosopographia Imperii Romani (The Prosopography of the Roman Empire, abbreviated PIR), Berlin (1898).
- John C. Traupman, The New College Latin & English Dictionary, Bantam Books, New York (1995).
- Steven L. Tuck, Latin Inscriptions in the Kelsey Museum: the Dennison and De Criscio Collections, Ann Arbor (2005).
- Marina Silvestrini, ed., Le tribù romane, Bari (2010).
