= Feronia (mythology) =

Italic goddess of wilderness and liberty

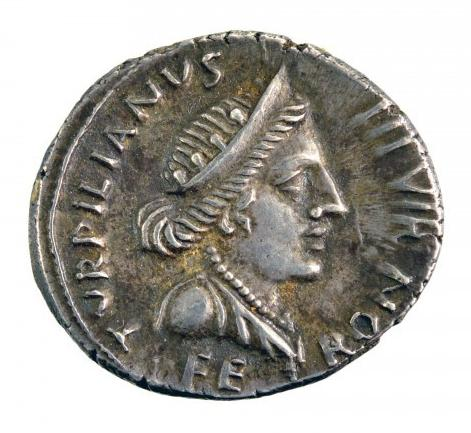
Denarius from the time of Augustus, in silver, minted under the monetary magistrate Petronius Turpillianus. On the right, the bust in profile of the goddess Feronia crowned with a diadem, dressed in a drape, a necklace around her neck. Legend: TURPILLIANUS III VIR FE RON (“Turpillianus being a monetary triumvir magistrate, in Feronia”)

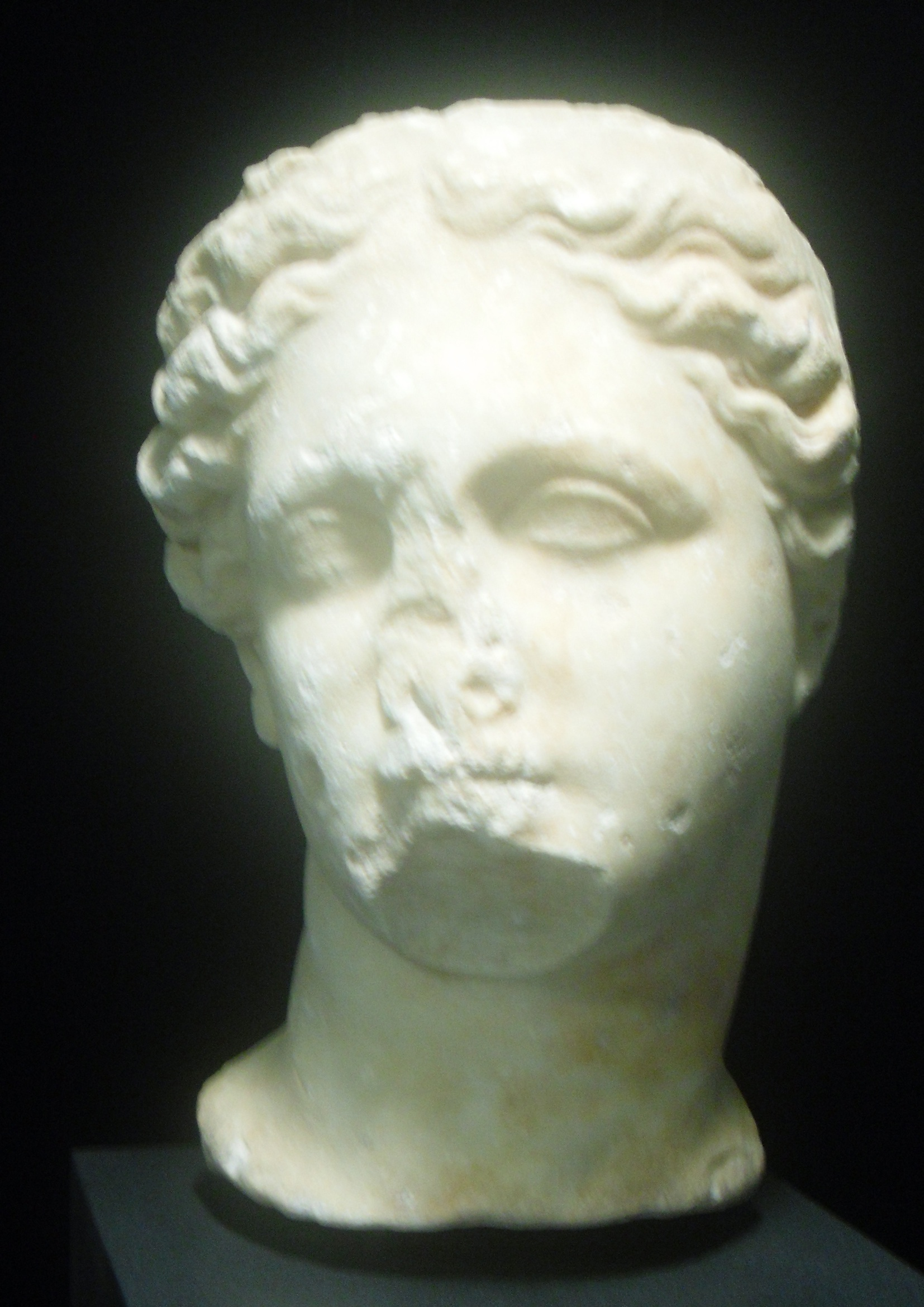
Head identified as Feronia (Archaeologic Museum of Rieti)

In Etruscan and Sabine religion, Feronia was a goddess associated with wildlife, fertility, health, and abundance. She was also venerated by the Faliscans, and later adopted into ancient Roman religion. As the goddess who granted freedom to slaves or civil rights to the most humble part of society, she was especially honored among plebeians and freedmen. Her festival, the Feroniae, was November 13 (the ides of November) during the Ludi Plebeii ("Plebeian Games"), in conjunction with Fortuna Primigenia; both were goddesses of Praeneste.

== Etymology ==
Feronia's name is derived from a Sabine adjective corresponding to Latin fĕrus, but with a long vowel, i.e. Fērōnǐa. The root fer has cognate words in every Indo-European language (e.g. Greek θήρ, θήριον, English feral.) Latin fĕrus means "not cultivated, untamed" (Thesaurus Linguae Latinae), "of the field, wood", "untamed", "not mitigated by any cultivation" (Forcellini Totius Latinitatis Lexicon) which fits the environment of the sanctuaries of Feronia and is very close to rudis (rude).

Feronia is one of the Roman and Italic goddesses whose name is formed by a root ending with the suffix -ona or -onia. This form of a noun denotes a difficult or dangerous state or condition: The deity is a sovereign of that danger, only to help man to best avoid damage or get the greatest advantage, such as Angerona for the angusti dies near the winter solstice.

== Myths and functions ==
Many versions of Feronia's cult have been supposed, and it is not quite clear if she was only one goddess or if she had only one function in ancient times. Some Latins believed Feronia to be a harvest goddess, and honoured her with the harvest firstfruits in order to secure a good harvest the following year.

Festus's entry on the picus Feronius (Note: Festus as cited by Dumézil.) of Trebula Mutuesca testifies the goddess had also prophetic qualities among the Sabines, as did the picus martius of Tiora Matiena ascribed to the Aborigines. Feronia also served as a goddess of travellers, fire, and waters.

=== Freedmen and Libertas ===
Varro identified Feronia with Libertas, the goddess who personified Liberty. (Note: Servius says that Varro called the goddess Liberty Feronia or Fidonia.) According to Servius, Feronia was a tutelary goddess of freedmen (dea libertorum). A stone at the Terracina shrine was inscribed "let deserving slaves sit down so that they may stand up free." Livy notes that in 217 BCE freed women collected money as a gift for Feronia. Some sources state that slaves were set free at her temple near Terracina.

=== Sabine tribal matron ===
She was among the deities that Sabine moneyers placed on their coins to honor their heritage. She may have been introduced into Roman religious practice when Manius Curius Dentatus conquered Sabinum in the early 3rd century BCE. (Note: Coarelli cited by Farney.)

=== Insistence on wild places ===
Two stories about her sanctuary of Terracina highlight the character of Feronia as goddess of the wilderness: Servius writes that when a fire destroyed her wood and the locals were about moving the statues to another location, the burnt wood suddenly turned green. (Note: Servius cited by Dumézil.)

Pliny states that all attempts at building towers in times of war between Terracina and the sanctuary of Feronia have been abandoned because all are without exception destroyed by lightning. (Note: Pliny as cited by Dumézil.) The goddess thus refused any continuity and linkage with the nearby town.

=== Role in the Aeneid ===
In Vergil's Aeneid, troops from Feronia's grove fight on the side of Turnus against Aeneas. The Arcadian king Evander recalls how in his youth he killed a son of Feronia, Erulus, who like Geryon had a triple body and a triple soul; Evander thus had to kill him three times. (Note: Aeneid and Servius's note to that passage.) Vergil identifies Erulus as the king of Praeneste, but he is otherwise unknown in literature.

=== Dumézil's interpretation ===
Dumézil considers Feronia to be a goddess of wilderness, of untamed nature, and of nature's vital forces – but honoured because she offers the opportunity to put those forces to good use in acquiring nurture, health, and fertility. She fecundates and heals, and therefore despite her being worshipped only in the wild, she receives the first-fruits of the harvest. Because she permits the people to domesticate the wild forces of vegetation, she could be seen as favouring the transformation of that which is uncouth into that which is cultivated.

Dumézil compares her to Vedic god Rudra: He and Feronia are similar in that Rudra represents that which has not yet been transformed by civilization – he is the god of the rude, of the jungle; at one time dangerous and uniquely useful: Healer, thanks to the herbs within his domain, protector of the freed slaves and of the outcast. Feronia, though, has only the positive or useful function of putting the forces of wild nature at the service of the people.

== Cult and cult sites ==
Inscriptions to Feronia are found mostly in central Italy. Feronia's shrines were all located in the wild, far from human settlements. Varro, however, places Feronia in his list of Sabine gods who had altars in Rome.

Feronia's cults at Aquileia and Terracina were near springs that were used in her rites. The Augustan poet Horace speaks of the water (lympha) of Feronia, in which "we bathe our face and hands." (Note: Horace as cited by Onians (1951).)

=== Capena, Etruria ===
Her lucus at Capena was a place where everybody was allowed to come for worship and trade, attracting people from different nations, Sabines, Latins, Etruscans, and others from even farther away. The grove provided everybody with a neutral territory in which peace must not be perturbed. (Note: Dionysius cited by Dumézil.)

Feronia's temple at the base of Mt. Soracte which was near Capena. The Lucus Feroniae, or "grove of Feronia" (Fiano Romano) was the site of an annual festival in her honour, which was in the nature of a trade fair. (Note: Müller (1828) identified her as a goddess of the marketplace.) The place, in the territory of Capena in southwestern Etruria, was plundered of its gold and silver by Hannibal's retreating troops in 211 BCE, when he turned aside from the Via Salaria to visit the sanctuary; later it became an Augustan colonia. Its status as a colony is recorded in a single inscription, copied in a manuscript of the rule of the Farfa Abbey as colonia Iulia Felix Lucoferonensis. (Note: Taylor (1920) identifies the site as Nazzano.)

=== Anxur, Terracina ===
Another important site was near Anxur (Terracina, southern Latium), in a wood three Roman miles from the town, where Servius recorded a joint cult of "the boy Jupiter" (puer Iuppiter) under the name of Anxyrus and "Juno the Virgin" (Iuno virgo), whom he identifies as Feronia. According to another tradition, slaves who had just been freed might go to the shrine at Terracina and receive upon their shaved heads the pileus, a hat that symbolized their liberty.

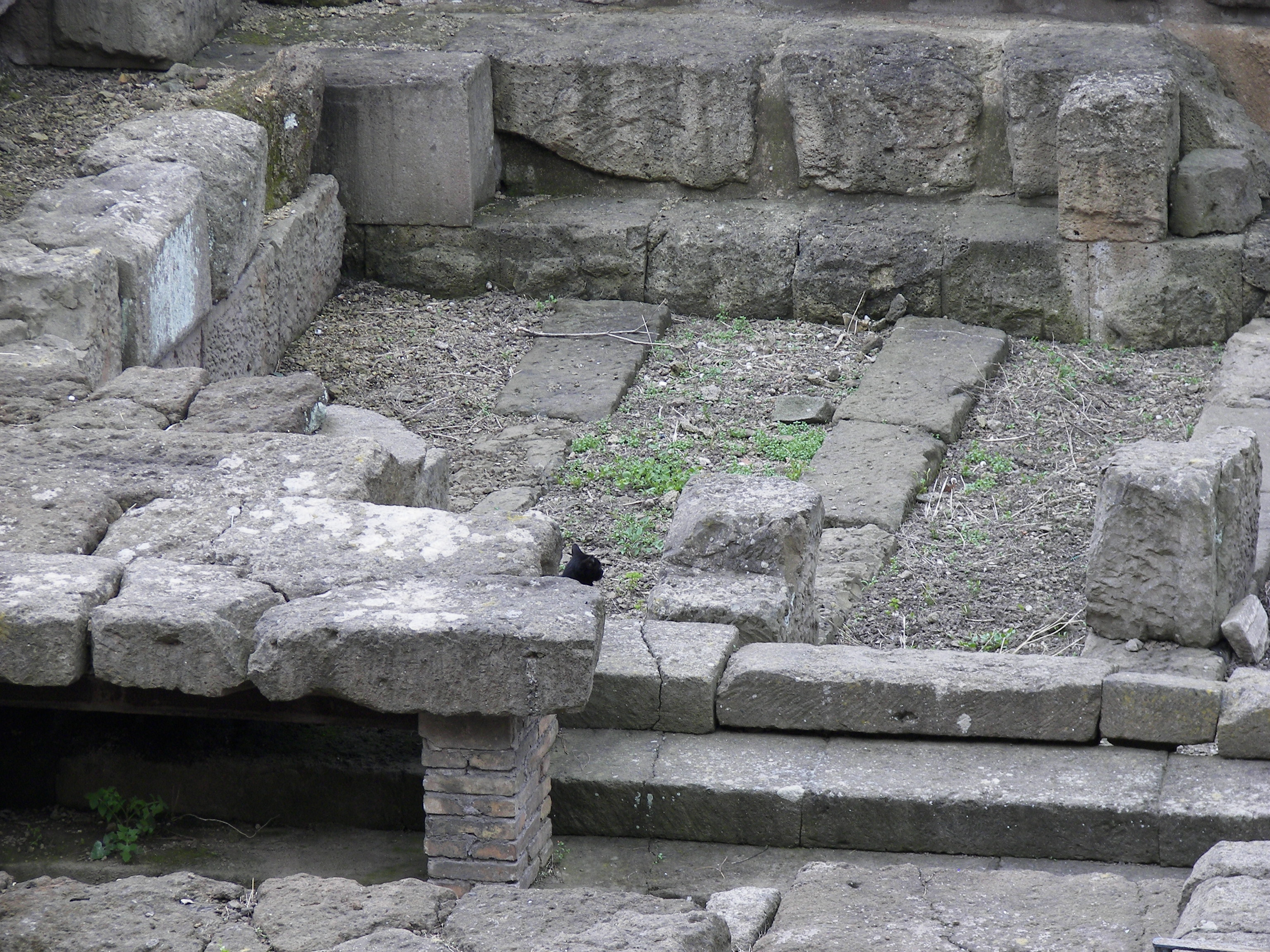
Ruin of the temple of Feronia at Largo di Torre Argentina

=== Campus Martius, Rome ===
Her temple in the Campus Martius, in what is now Largo di Torre Argentina, was probably also located in a grove, according to an inscription found on the site. (Note: Gatti (1905) cited by Dumézil.) It was established before 217 BCE. It may have been dedicated by Curtius Dentatus following his victory over the Sabines. His building program also included the Anio Vetus, a major new aqueduct, and a number of fountains near the temple.

=== Late continuation ===
Charles Godfrey Leland reported surviving traditions of the "witch" Feronia in 19th century Tuscany.

== Namesakes ==
The asteroid 72 Feronia is named for her.
