= Strada statale 4 dir Via Salaria =

Italian state highway

State highway 4 dir Via Salaria
- Strada statale 4dir
- Via Salaria

Route information
- Maintained by ANAS
- Length: 4.5 km (2.8 mi)
- Existed: 1964–present

Major junctions
- From: Strada statale 4 Via Salaria at Passo Corese
- Autostrada A1 at Fiano Romano
- To: Provincial road SP 15/A Tiberina at Fiano Romano

Location
- Country: Italy
- Regions: Lazio

Highway system
- Roads in Italy; Autostrade; State; Regional; Provincial; Municipal
← SS 4	→ SS 5

The strada statale 4 dir Via Salaria (SS 4 dir) is a short Italian state highway, linking Strada statale 4 Via Salaria at Passo Corese to the A1 motorway at Fiano Romano.

It is a dual carriageway highway long only 4.5 kilometres (2.8 mi), made in 1964 and managed by ANAS. It is recognized as a road of national interest.

== Route ==
Strada statale 4 Dir was built to make more fluid traffic between the province of Rieti and Rome, taking advantage to the fact that, in that area, Via Salaria and the A1 motorway are very close (3 kilometres (1.9 mi)) but divided by Tiber river.

In fact, SS 4 Dir allows to travel from Passo Corese to Rome entirely on fast-flowings roads, linking Via Salaria to the A1 motorway northbound branch (A1 Dir) which is connected to Grande Raccordo Anulare and, from this, to Tangenziale Est of Rome. The alternative would be to use the Strada statale 4 Via Salaria that is a single carriage highway, extending travel times and clogging up traffic.

Via Salaria dir
Exit	↓Distance↓	Province
Via Salaria	0.0 km (0 mi)	Rieti
Passo Corese logistics hub Fara in Sabina railroad station	0.8 km (0.50 mi)	Rome
Tiber river	1.1 km (0.68 mi)	Rome
Fiano Romano	2.8 km (1.7 mi)	Rome
A1 northbound branch (Fiano Romano motorway exit) (only entry towards Passo Corese)	3.7 km (2.3 mi)	Rome
A1 northbound branch (Fiano Romano motorway exit) (only exit towards Rome) Provincial road SP 15/A Tiberina- Fiano Romano A1 toolboth	4.5 km (2.8 mi)	Rome
