= Ergastulum =

Roman building used to hold in chains dangerous slaves, or to punish other slaves

An ergastulum (plural: ergastula) was a Roman workhouse building used as a type of factory with slaves held in chains or to punish slaves. The ergastulum was usually built as a deep, roofed pit below ground level, large enough to allow the slaves to work within it, and containing narrow spaces in which they slept. Ergastula were common structures on all slave-using farms (latifundia). The etymology is disputed between two possible Greek roots: ergasterios "workshop" and ergastylos "pillar to which slaves are tethered."

Augustus instituted inspections of ergastula because travelers were being illegally seized and held in them. The ergastulum was made illegal during the reign of Hadrian as part of a series of reforms to improve conditions for slaves.

Columella in his De re rustica states that an underground ergastulum should be as healthful as possible and lit by windows with narrow bars, which are far enough from the ground that it is not possible to reach them by hand. In the Loeb Classical Library 1941 edition H. B. Ash translates a later section in Book 1, Chapter 8 of De re rustica as: "Again, it is the established custom of all men of caution to inspect the inmates of the workhouse [ergastuli], to find out whether they are carefully chained, whether the places of confinement are quite safe and properly guarded, whether the overseer has put anyone in fetters or removed his shackles without the master's knowledge." Ash translates the term ergastulis as "chain-gangs" upon its first appearance in De re rustica in Book 1, Chapter 3.

== Examples ==
- Villa dei Volusii
