= Villa dei Volusii =

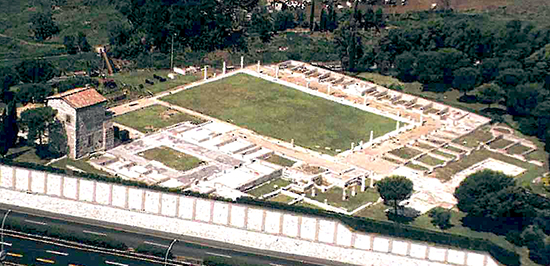
- View of the archaeological site of Villa dei Volusii with the adjacent A1 highway

- Location within Lazio
- 42°07′58.08″N 12°36′2.2″E
- Type: Villa rustica
- Periods: Roman Republic Roman Empire
- Cultures: Ancient Rome
- Location: Fiano Romano
- Region: Metropolitan City of Rome Capital, Lazio, Italy

History
- Built: around 50 BC; (2075–2076 years ago)
- Built by: Volusii-Saturnini Family

Site notes
- Excavation dates: 1962-1972
- Management: Società Autostrade S.p.A.
- Public access: yes
- Website: http://sabap-rm-met.beniculturali.it/it/300/la-villa-dei-volusii

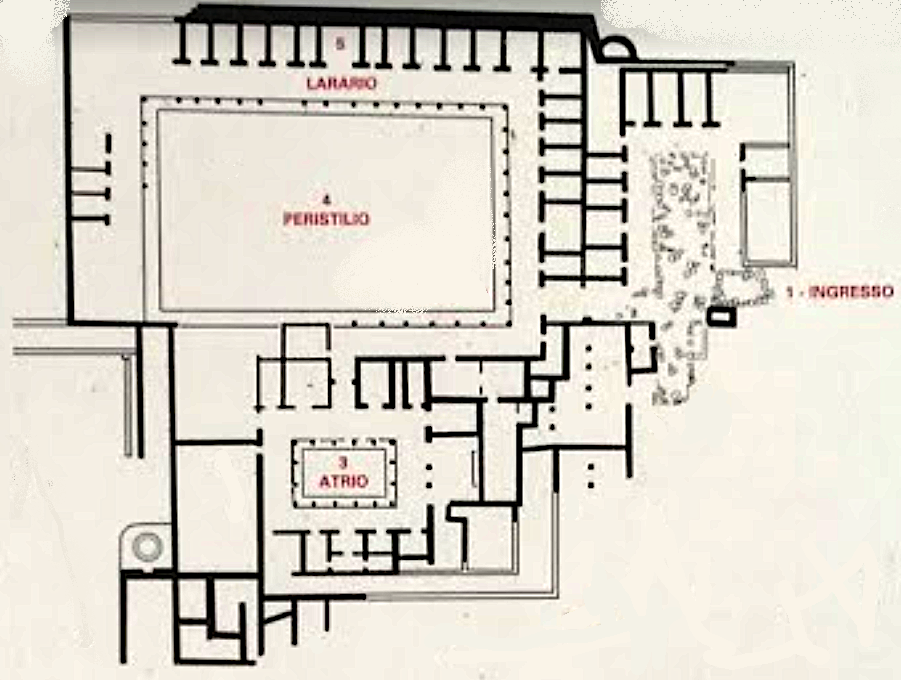
Villa dei Volusii plan

The ancient Roman Villa dei Volusii or Villa dei Volusii-Saturnini is an archaeological site located in the municipality of Fiano Romano, next to the ancient Roman town and sanctuary of Lucus Feroniae, along the route of ancient Via Tiberina.

This villa is a unique example of an almost entirely excavated large senatorial villa in Italy.

It was a luxurious villa owned by the politically powerful senatorial family of the Volusii Saturnini, and one of the largest Roman villas.

== Discovery ==
The discovery of the scale and importance of the site was completely accidental even though a Roman cryptoporticus and related structures in the area were known, and it was very close to the known Lucus Feroniae sanctuary: in 1962 it was found during the construction of the A1 highway at the Fiano Romano tollbooth.

== Excavation ==
The excavation of the complex, cut in two by the highway's access ramp, was done from 1962 to 1971. Renovation continued until the 1990s with the restoration of the mosaic floors, walls, and structures, the setting up of a small antiquarium, and the installation of protective roofs.

== History ==
This villa rustica fits into the group of villas built in the Roman republican age by senatorial families not far from Rome in a fertile area, being not only a country residence but also a large farm.

The villa that can be seen today was largely built around the middle of the 1st century BC by the senatorial family of the Volusii Saturnini, probably on an existing villa that had belonged to the Egnatii family, opponents of Augustus who had their assets seized after their death. From the senator Quintus Volusius, known to Cicero, the villa passed to his son Lucius Volusius Saturninus (consul 12 BC), cousin of Tiberius, who enlarged the building. He adapted it in the style of Hellenistic villas, in vogue in the Augustan age, equipping it with residential and spa facilities, enriching it with new mosaic decorations and expanding the residential part with the construction of a gigantic peristyle and with a lararium with statues of the family's ancestors. The family also owned the more commercial villa-estate at Settefinestre.

On the death of Quintus Volusius Saturninus, who was consul in 56 AD, the villa was probably acquired by the emperor.

Around this date, the villa changed radically from a suburban luxury villa into a large agricultural production centre typical of a latifundium, complete with large slave quarters (ergastulum), and this seems to have continued, with a corresponding deterioration of the quality of the residential part, up to the end of the 4th century AD. The villa was restored between the 3rd and 4th centuries AD. Traces of devastation (including the violent shattering of the statues) and of fires have been revealed by excavations, but the villa was frequented until the 5th century AD, when a small cemetery was set up in the residential part.

Starting from the early Middle Ages, a religious building was first built and then a small fortified centre with towers and, finally, a rustic farmhouse reported in the maps of the area of the 16th century.

== Description ==
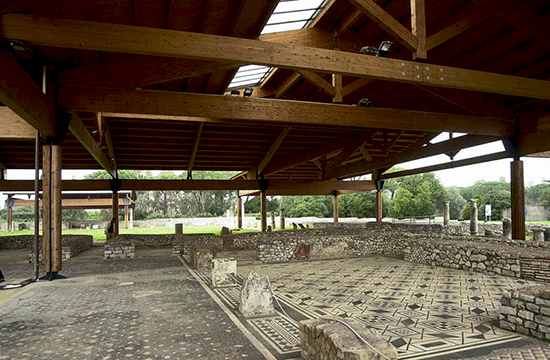
Mosaic floors at Villa dei Volusii

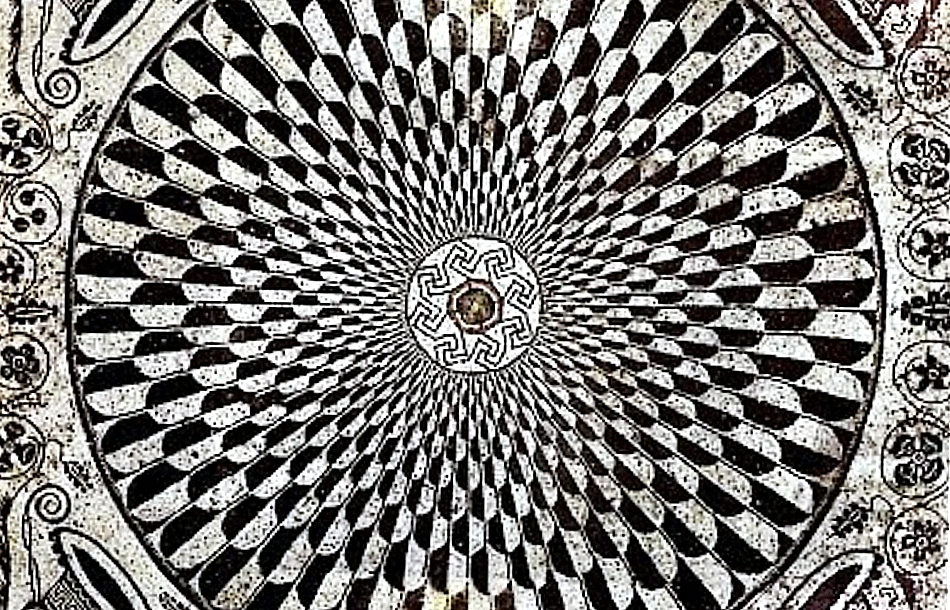
Mosaic in detail

The villa was located about 400 metres (1,300 ft) from Lucus Feroniae alongside the Via Tiberina and was built on an embankment that offered a panoramic view of the lower Tiber Valley.

It was built on two levels, the upper one supported by a cryptoporticus which housed the residential part with an atrium, triclinium, tablinum, with large peristyle, garden and lararium. Overall, around sixty rooms have been identified built in the republican and imperial eras. Some rooms retain polychrome mosaics with beautiful geometric decorations often finished with flowers, birds, and various symbols.

The original phase from about 50 BC consisted of: a large hexastyle atrium with travertine columns surrounded by a beautiful tablinum flanked by side rooms, a series of rooms of various sizes on the long sides of the atrium which include cubicula, a triclinium and living rooms; below was a viridarium with ashlar columns supporting pergolas, while a portico ran externally along the western side, perhaps to connect the villa with the adjacent fields. The eastern side of the villa had very fine geometric mosaics, among which the one decorating room 18 has a polychrome imitation of Hellenistic carpets. The exceptional opus sectile floor in room 23, one of the oldest known examples of such flooring, seems to date back to this period too.

A second phase from the Augustan period is indicated by opus reticulatum in the western part of the "noble" nucleus. In this phase, a series of entrances to the portico were opened, and the new wing was given black and white mosaic floors. Among these, the floors of tablinum 13 and room 8 stand out for their finesse and complexity. During the first century AD, probably in the Flavian age, there was a radical change in the layout and functions of the villa. In the main nucleus, some floors were replaced; the viridarium with pergola was replaced by a complex series of service rooms (kitchens, storerooms, tubs). A grandiose peristyle with Tuscan travertine columns and a series of small rooms on the three sides of the peristyle was built alongside the western side, with the main nucleus. These small rooms - about thirty in all - are generally similar in size with floors of bare rock, except for the central room on the west side which was larger and paved with black and white mosaic and contained an altar, and a marble seat, while a masonry counter in the NW corner of the room bore the long and important eulogy for Lucius Volusius Saturninus (consul of 3 AD) and Q. Volusius Saturninus (consul of 56). In this room (and all around the peristyle) were fragmented portrait statues and marble busts of L. Volusius Saturninus, his wife Cornelia, Q. Volusius Saturninus, and perhaps Volusia Torquata known from an epigraph from the Hadrianic age. The lararium of the slaves with a complex set of furnishings, sculptures, and inscriptions in the great peristyle is remarkable and was related to the ergastulum or slave quarters (for no less than 500 slaves).

Behind the ergastulum peristyle, there is an open corner at the end of a road, evidently used as a point of arrival and parking for wagons from the surrounding countryside. Room 34 at the NW corner of the peristyle is a latrine, and along the south side of the same complex are 50 closets intended for washing and bathing, all part of the slave economy of the imperial-age villa.

The site included a cistern and nymphaeums.

The lower part of the site was the pars rustica, or farm, which included an oil mill and an ergastulum, a building used to keep dangerous slaves in chains or to punish slaves.

== Archaeological site ==
The Villa dei Volusii, as well as Lucus Feroniae, was included in the project of the Virtual Museum of the Tiber Valley.

== Bibliography ==
- Torelli, Mario (1973). Supplemento all'Enciclopedia dell'Arte Antica (in Italian). Rome.
- Tomassetti, Giuseppe (1980). La campagna romana: antica, medievale e moderna (in Italian). Vol. 3. Cassia, Clodia, Flaminia, Tiberina, Labicana, Prenestina.
- Sgubini Moretti, Anna Maria; Moretti, Mario (1977). La villa dei Volusii a Lucus Feroniae (in Italian). Rome.
- Gazzetti, Gianfranco (1997). La villa dei Volusii a Fiano Romano (in Italian). Rome: Quasar.
- Boenzi, Giuliana; Ciccarese, Antonella; Di Giammatteo, Paola; Fei, Francesca; Gazzetti, Gianfranco; Stanco, Enrico Angelo (1997). Terra di Fiano : ricerche di storia, arte, archeologia (in Italian). Quasar.
- Sgubini Moretti, Anna Maria (1998). "La ristrutturazione in età augustea". In Sgubini Moretti, Anna Maria (ed.). Fastosa rusticatio: la villa dei Volusii a Lucus Feroniae (in Italian). L'Erma di Bretschneider.
- Sforzini, Clementina (1998). "Le fasi successive". In Sgubini Moretti, Anna Maria (ed.). Fastosa rusticatio: la villa dei Volusii a Lucus Feroniae (in Italian). L'Erma di Bretschneider.
- De Franceschini, Marina (2005). Ville dell'agro romano (in Italian). Rome: L'Erma di Bretschneider.
- Marzano, Annalisa (2007). Roman villas in central Italy: a social and economic history. Boston: Brill.
- Zanni, Sara (2013). La Villa dei Volusii Saturnini a Lucus Feroniae: ambienti virtuali per la ricerca archeologica (Doctoral Thesis) (PDF) (in Italian). Milan: Milan University.
