= Aqua Augusta (Rome) =

Coordinates: 41°53′12″N 12°28′10″E

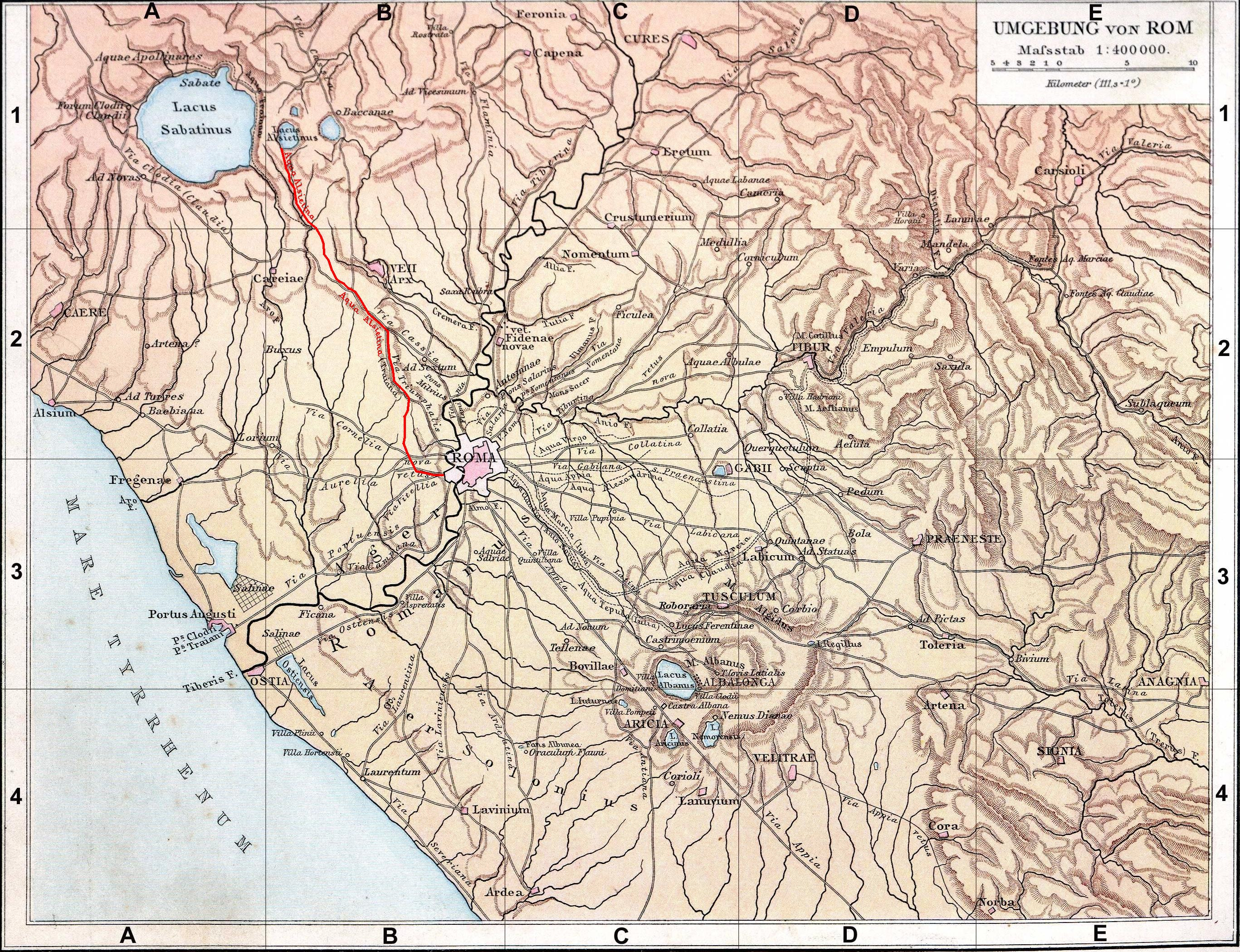
Map of Aqua Augusta

The Aqua Augusta, which was also called the Aqua Alsietina, was an aqueduct supplying ancient Rome.The Emperor Augustus built the Aqua Augusta in order to supplement the Aqua Marcia, and then later the Aqua Claudia when required.

The aqueduct, perhaps via a branch, also fed the town of Feronia as mentioned in inscriptions found there.
