= Fiano Romano =

- Comune
- Comune di Fiano Romano
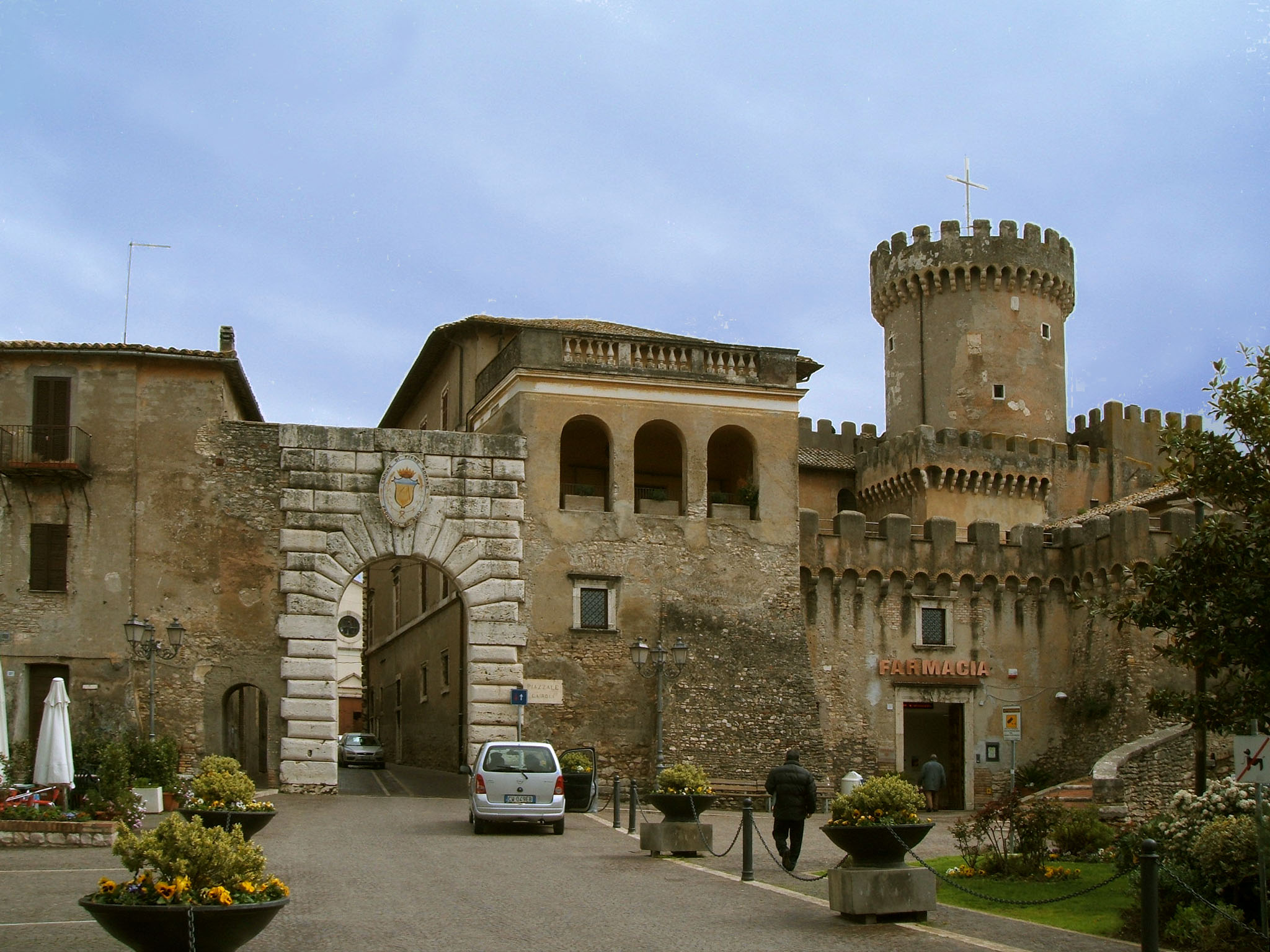
- Ducal Orsini Castle.

- Location within Italy Location within Lazio
- Coordinates: 42°10′N 12°36′E
- Country: Italy
- Region: Lazio
- Metropolitan city: Rome (RM)

Government
  - Mayor: Davide Santonastaso

Area
  - Total: 41 km^{2} (16 sq mi)
- Elevation: 97 m (318 ft)

Population (30 April 2023)
  - Total: 16,255
  - Density: 400/km^{2} (1,000/sq mi)
- Demonym: Fianesi
- Time zone: UTC+1 (CET)
  - Summer (DST): UTC+2 (CEST)
- Postal code: 00065
- Dialing code: 0765
- ISTAT code: 058036
- Patron saint: St. Stephen
- Saint day: August 3
- Website: Official website

Fiano Romano is a town and comune (municipality) in the Metropolitan City of Rome, Italy, approximately 40 kilometres (25 mi) north of the city.

Fiano Romano borders the following municipalities: Capena, Civitella San Paolo, Montelibretti, Montopoli di Sabina, Nazzano.

== Etymology ==
There are multiple hypotheses about the origin of the name Fiano:

- According to some, the toponym could originally be derived from both the root of the Latin word Flavus (yellow, blond), with evident reference to the production of cereals grown or visible in the place; both from the reference to the possessions that the gens Flavia had in the area (from Flaiano, composed of the Latin personal name Flavius and the suffix "anus" which indicates belonging).
- In Virgil's descriptions of the people who inhabited the Faliscan Capenate territory in prehistoric times, the reference to the Flavini fields appears; while in the texts of Silio Italico reference is made to Flavina or "of the Flavini fields" to describe the area where the sanctuary of Feronia was located and where the Capenas river (today's Gramiccia) flowed. The term also returns in Servius's commentary on the Aeneid where there is a reference to the inhabited center of Flavinium.
- A further hypothesis would be that according to which the name of the city derives from Fanum Feroniae, that is the temple of Feronia.
- It is also possible that the name Fiano, already known in the Middle Ages as Flavianum or Flaianum, is the toponym of a landholding dating back to those of the imperial funds of the Constantinian age (the Nomen of Flavus had in fact been assumed by the Emperor Constantine).

In 1872, following a request made by the City Council, the name officially changed in Fiano Romano through a royal decree by Victor Emmanuel II.

== History ==
The territory of Fiano Romano, due to its position close to the Tiber river, has been inhabited since the archaic ages: in fact, ceramics from the 8th century BC have been found, which show the cultural influence in the area of Faliscans, Sabines, Etruscans and Latins.

Between the 7th and 5th centuries BC the area was under the control of the ancient city of Capena, ally of Veii: in this period was the foundation of the nearby sacred grove of Lucus Feroniae.

At the beginning of the 4th century BC Rome completed the conquest of the entire area which passed under its control. Lucus Feroniae remained the main attraction: Hannibal, in 211 BC, went there to plunder the sanctuary, while in 70 BC many lands around the sanctuary were expropriated and awarded to the legionaries of Caesar by Antonio and Octavian (the future Augustus). The construction of the Villa dei Volusii also dates from this period. For the whole Roman imperial period the area was very active in the production of cereals, wine and olive oil.

In the Middle Ages the territory of Fiano passed under the control of the various religious centers and monasteries in the area (a 1081 bull of Pope Gregory VII assigns the possession of the Flaiano fund (Castellum Flaianum) to the Monastery of San Paolo fuori le mure).

In the Renaissance period it was a fief of the Orsini, a powerful noble family, who in 1489, with Niccolò III Orsini, built the castle there. Fiano then passed to the Sforza family who made Fiano as a Duchy (bull of Pope Pius V in 1608), then to the Ludovisi-Ottoboni-Boncompagni family.

In 1897 the last Duke of Fiano Marco Boncompagni Ludovisi Ottoboni sold the entire property to Carlo Menotti, a construction contractors, building contractor, land speculator and politician.

After the Fascist era the lands were entrusted directly to the peasants while part of the castle was donated by Menotti family to a religious order.

In 1993 the Municipality of Fiano Romano bought the entire Ducal Castle.

== Geography ==
=== Location ===
Fiano Romano rises on the right bank of the Tiber river, which separates it from the Sabina. The territory is mostly hilly but there are large flat areas alongside the river. Average height is about 86 metres (282 ft) above sea level, with a minimum height of 17 metres (56 ft) and a maximum of 244 metres (801 ft).

=== Climate ===
The climate is temperate with long, dry summers and generally mild but rainy winters, making Fiano Romano part of the Csa group according to the Köppen climate classification. The proximity of the Tiber is felt, which increases the humidity rate.

The average annual temperature is 4.9 °C (40.8 °F) with August being the hottest month of the year with an average temperature of 25.2 °C (77.4 °F) while the coldest month is January with an average temperature of 5.6 °C (42.1 °F).

During summer, from June to the end of September, daytime temperatures can reach 31 °C (88 °F) and night temperatures are around 15 °C (59 °F), while during heat waves the daytime temperatures can reach even 36 °C (97 °F).

The average annual rainfall is 1,027 millimetres (3.369 ft), with July the driest month (28 millimetres (0.092 ft)) and November the wettest (154 millimetres (0.505 ft)).

== Demographics ==
Historical population

Year	Pop.	±%
1861	-	—
1871	692	—
1881	923	+33.4%
1901	1,363	+47.7%
1911	1,546	+13.4%
1921	1,776	+14.9%
1931	1,988	+11.9%
1936	2,141	+7.7%

Year	Pop.	±%
1951	2,668	+24.6%
1961	2,764	+3.6%
1971	3,267	+18.2%
1981	4,339	+32.8%
1991	6,294	+45.1%
2001	7,924	+25.9%
2011	13,059	+64.8%
2021	16,027	+22.7%

Source: ISTAT

== Main signs ==
=== Orsini Ducal Castle ===
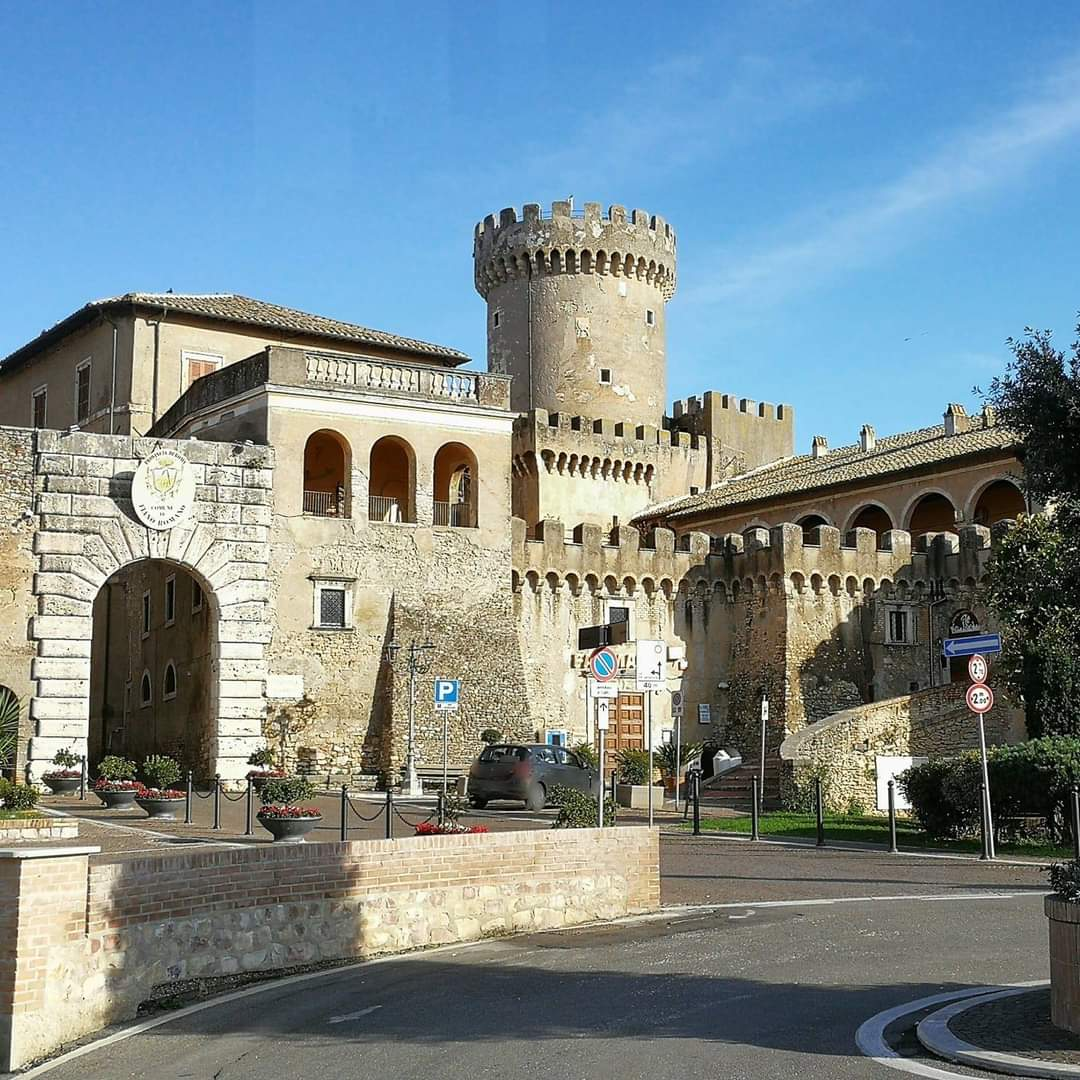
Orsini Ducal Castle at Fiano Romano

It is a renaissance castle committed by Nicola III Orsini in 1489 and terminated in 1493.It became a Ducal castle in 1609 when the Sforza family make Fiano as a Duchy. The castle has a rectangular plan with two defense towers and crenellated walls. The smaller tower is quadrangular with a slope in the lower part. The largest tower, called mastio, is placed in the keep, is circular and is 30 metres (98 ft) high with walls 2.7 metres (8.9 ft) wide. The castle, set in the medieval village, has its entrance on the main square of Fiano in front of the Church of Santo Stefano Nuovo. Inside there is a courtyard with a staircase leading to the main floor and from the terrace, adorned with guelph battlements, you have a view of the surrounding lands that belonged to the fief.

The renaissance wing on the main floor is divided into nine rooms, connected to each other by doors whose jambs bear the inscription Nicolaus Tirtius Ursinus 1493, that is the date on which the works were carried out and, probably, when the frescoes were completed:

- Montefeltro room: decorated with inlaid and carved friezes in wood, it seems like the study of Guido da Montefeltro;
- Orsini Study room: there are frescoes with coats of arms of Niccolò III Orsini, a reliquary where the holy oil was kept and with images of four saints (Saint Jerome, Saint John the Batist, Saint Roch and Saint Catherine of Alexandria);
- Hall of the Guard: in this room, on December 19, 1493 Pope Alexander VI granted indulgences, and a plaque on a staircase commemorate the event;
- Choir room: small frescoed room decorated with architraves;
- Hall of the Zodiac: there are 12 frescoes of the 12 constellations and the coats of arms of families related to the Orsini;
- Room of the Virgins or blue room: have lunettes with four women announcing the birth of Christ;
- Hall of Christ: in the center of the room there is the Sacred Heart;
- Room of Ubaldini: here are presented coats of arms related to Orsini family;
- Pomegranate room: there are floral frescoes with pomegranate and a fireplace dated 1493.

=== Villa dei Volusii ===
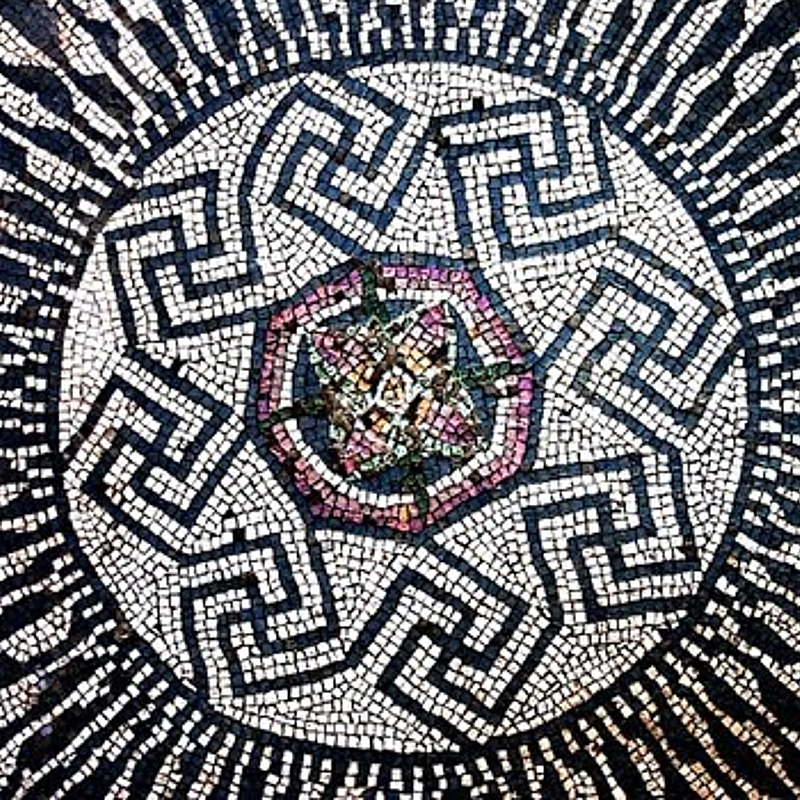
Mosaic of Villa dei Volusii at Fiano Romano

It is a Roman campaign's manor built around the middle of the 1st century BC form the senatorial family of the Volusii Saturnini (well known by Cicero) and used until the 5th century AD. It is a perfect example of villas build in the Roman Republican age by the senatorial families not far from Rome, in a fertile and highly disputed territory from the point of view of the real estate market of the time, being not only a country residence (i.e. villa d'otium) but also headquarters of production facilities (villa rustica).

The villa was built on an embankment that offers a panoramic view of the lower Tiber Valley, extends over two levels with the upper one that housed the noble residence with a polystyle atrium, rooms on the left side, cubicles and triclinium on the right, tablinum on the bottom. The peristyle with the lararium stands on the right side of the elegant district.

The complex was further enlarged during ages of emperors Hadrian and Traian, it underwent restorations in the 3rd-4th century AD and was frequented until the 5th century AD when a small cemetery was set up in the residential part. Then, starting from the early Middle Ages, a religious building was first built and then a small fortified center with towers and, finally, a rustic farmhouse.

It was discovered in 1962 during works for A1 highway construction and it is actually completely bring to light. It features splendid mosaics and the remains of a series of rooms and other spaces.

The villa can be accessed through Lucus Feronia.

=== Mausoleum of Fiano Romano ===
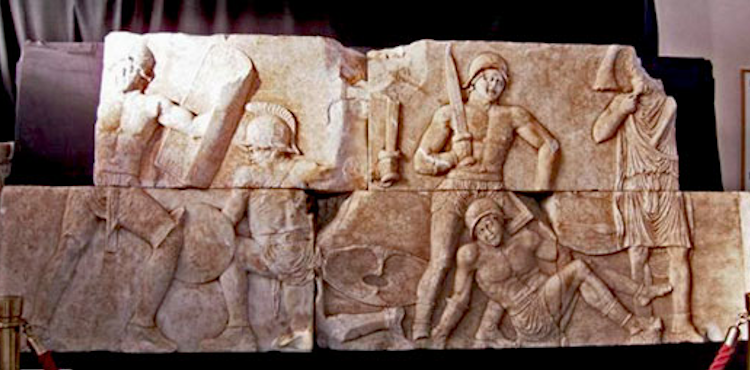
Mausoleum of Fiano Romano exposed in the antiquarium of Lucus Feroniae

It is composed by thirteen blocks of marble finely decorated in relief with scenes of gladiator fights.

Dating back to the 1st century BC blocks originally adorned the tower tomb of a Roman magistrate.

Discovered by Carabinieri Art Squad in 2007 hidden under a thin layer of topsoil in field at Fiano Romano, blocks are exposed in the antiquarium of Lucus Feroniae.

=== Medieval bell ===
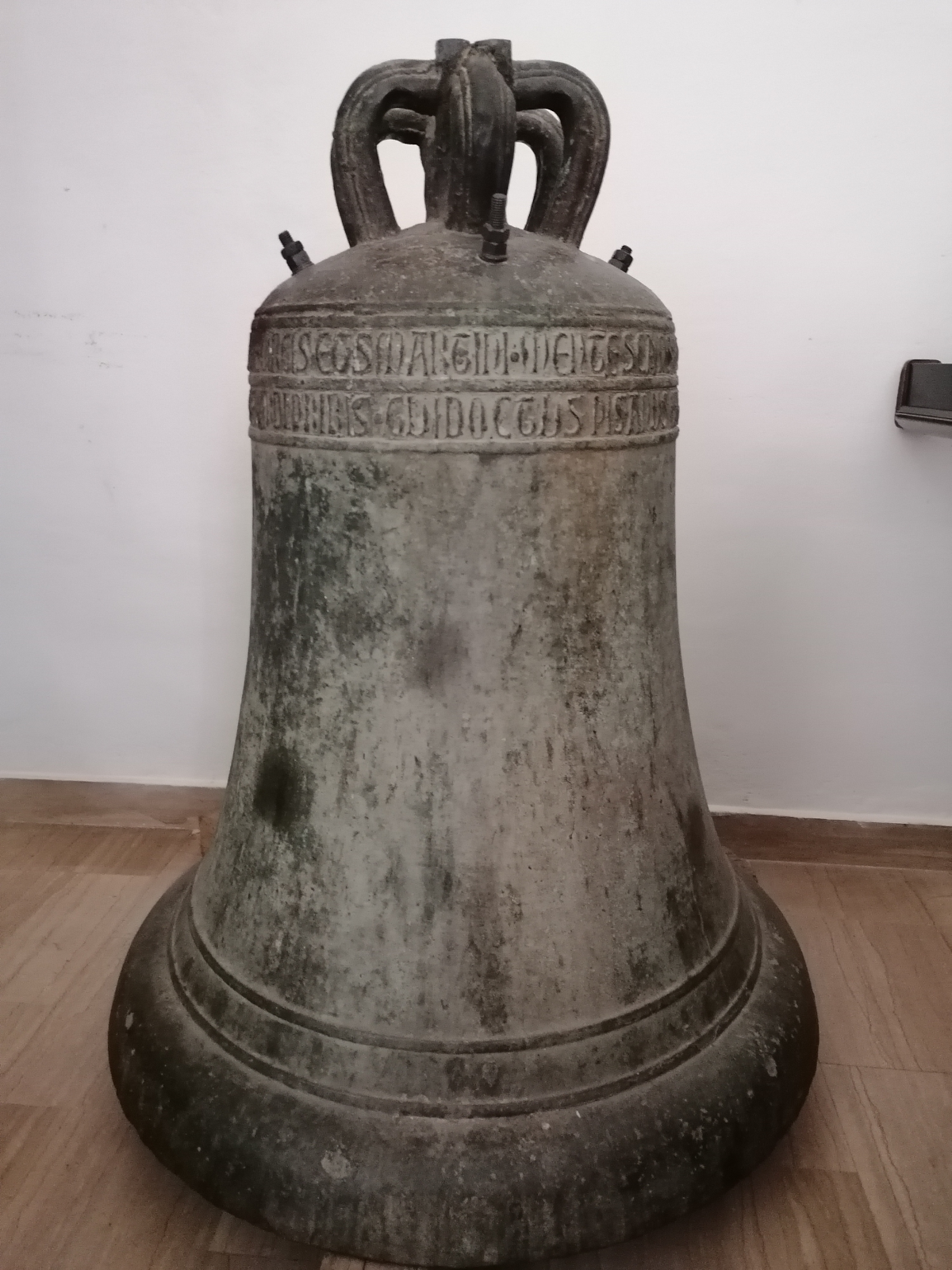
Medieval bell made in 1278 conserved in Fiano Romano

In the side aisle of the Church of Santo Stefano Nuovo in Fiano Romano there is a medieval bell, built in 1278 for the Church of San Biagio, a church that no longer exists and whose exact location is not known today. The bell, made of bronze, is about 94 centimetres (37 in) high with a circumference at the base of about 128 centimetres (50 in) and a diameter of 77 centimetres (30 in). It was made by Guidotto Pisano, a very famous bell caster of the 13th century. Guidotto made, for example, about in 1280 the Campana della Rota bell in Vatican Saint Peter's Basilica and in 1288 one for Santa Maria Maggiore Church. These bells are still currently used.

=== Monument to the Fallen of the Two World Wars ===
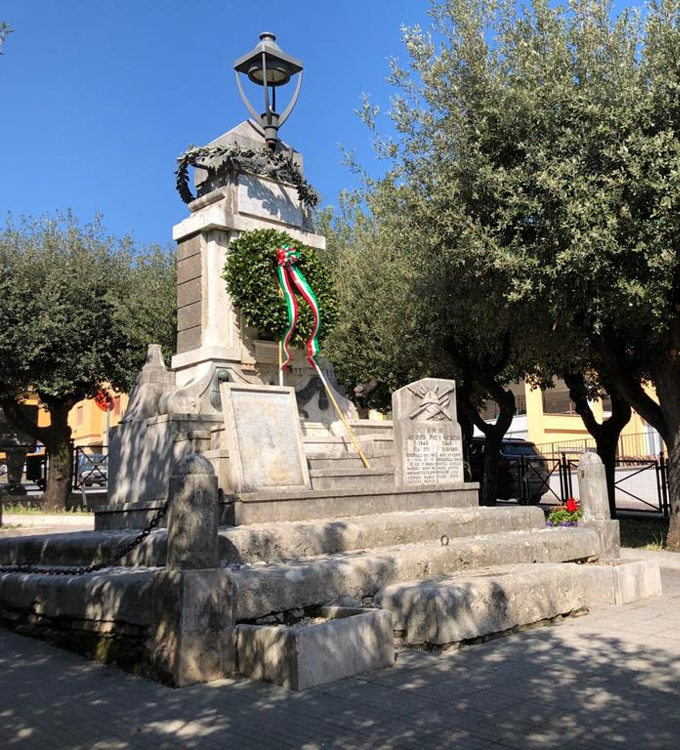
Monument to the fallen of the Two World Wars at Fiano Romano

It is a monument dedicated to the citizens of Fiano Romano, military and civilians, who fell in the two World Wars. Located just outside the medieval village in the Parco delle Rimembranze, it is a travertine pillar which appears, in the front part, in the shape of an altar with a bronze laurel wreath at the top, at the bottom a festoon also in bronze and at its sides two lion protomes and weapons, also in bronze. In the rear part there is the coat of arms of the Municipality of Fiano Romano and below is the basin of a small fountain. In the center of the pillar are engraved the names of the citizens who fell in the First World War, while on the two tombstones, added later, placed in front and on the sides of the pillar, those of the fallen and missing in the Second World War . The monument was designed and built between 1919 and 1924 by the architect Edgardo Negri and the sculptor Enrico Brai, whose names are engraved on it.

=== Statue of Enrico Berlinguer ===
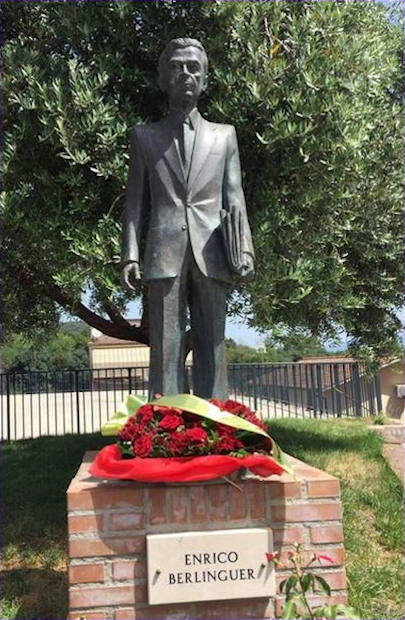
Statue of Enrico Berlinguer at Fiano Romano

The bronze statue of Enrico Berlinguer was commissioned by the Municipality of Fiano Romano and built by the Iranian sculptor Reza Olia after the death of the communist politician, which took place on June 11, 1984. In previous years Berlinguer had visited Fiano Romano many times for his political role but he also had established friendly relationships. The statue, inaugurated on June 15, 1985, is located in the plaza at the entrance of the medieval village.

=== PortaRoma ===
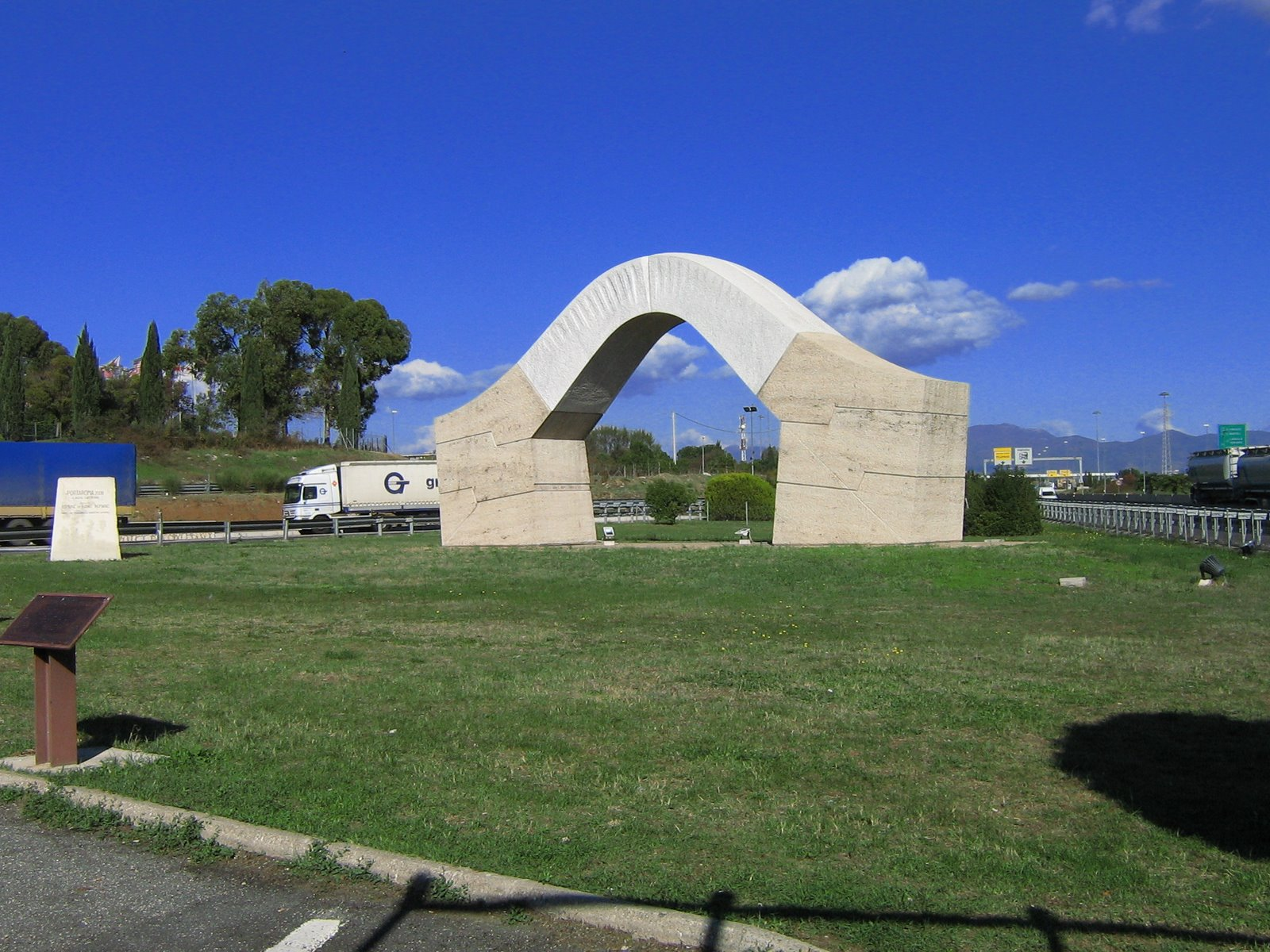
The arch-sculpture PortaRoma nearby the highway entrance at Fiano Romano

it is an arch-sculpture composed of two marble monoliths of 36,000 kilograms (79,000 lb) each which oppose each other and self-sustain without keystone for only mutual contrast of thrust discharged on the two shoulders, made with superimposed blocks of travertine and assembled only in contact with cuttings. The arch-sculpture measures are 15 metres (49 ft) length, 2.2 metres (7.2 ft) depth and 7 metres (23 ft) height and a total weight of 210,000 kilograms (460,000 lb). Made by Claudio Capotondi on the occasion of the Great Jubilee, it was inaugurated on October, 29th 2000. It is located next A1 motorway Roma Nord entrance at Fiano Romano.

=== Santo Stefano Vecchio's Ciborium (at Metropolitan Museum of Art in New York) ===
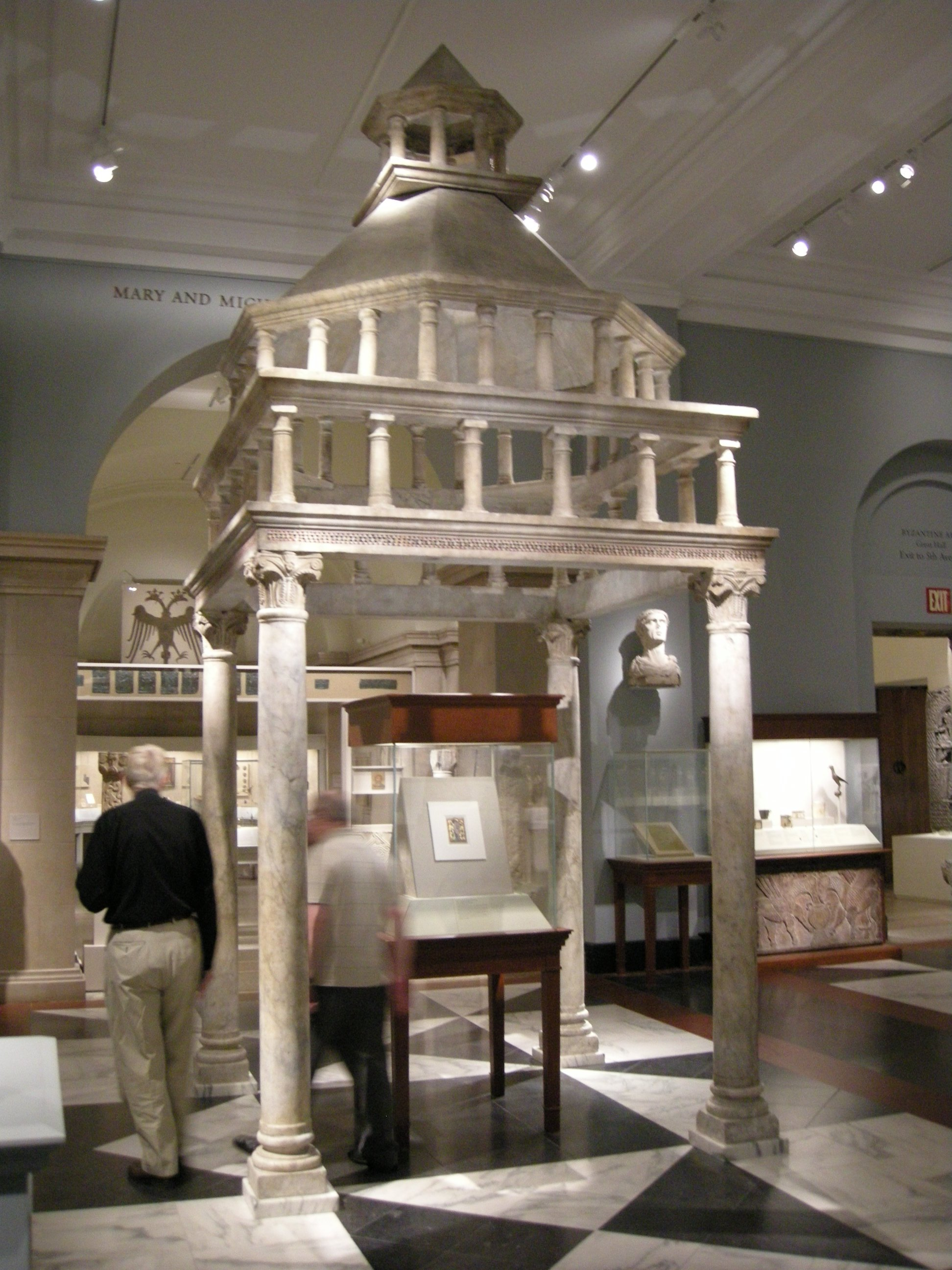
Santo Stefano Vecchio's Ciborium exposed in the Metropolitan Museum of Art of New York

It is a marble canopy made about in 1150 for the church of Santo Stefano Vecchio at Fiano Romano. In 1888, the church was desecrated and in 1889 was sold to private individuals but the ciborium had already disappeared. It reappeared in the maison of New York tycoon Henry William Poor in 1903 and then in 1909 was acquired by the Metropolitan Museum of Art in New York City for 7,100 dollars (equivalent in purchasing power to about 224,000 dollars in 2022).

=== Fiano Romano's Mitra (at Louvre Museum in Paris) ===
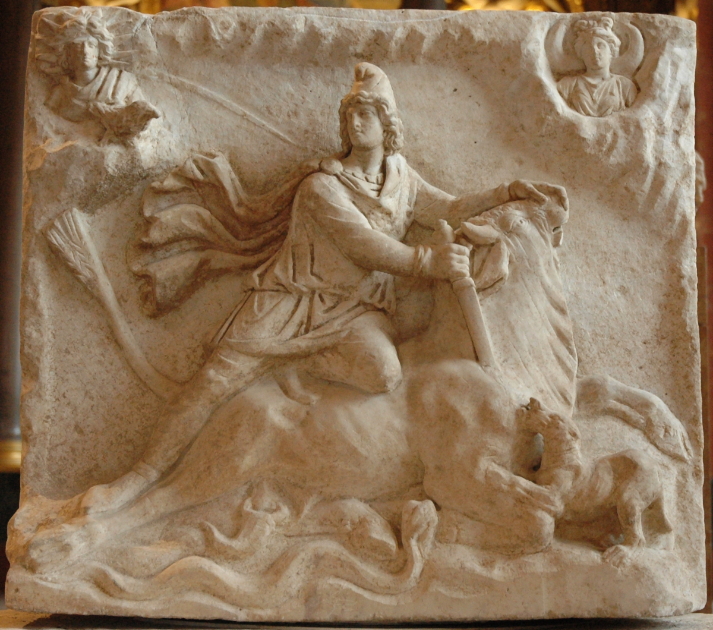
Fiano Romano's Mitra at Louvre Museum of Paris

It is a marble bas-relief on a travertine base (61 centimetres (24 in) x 68 centimetres (27 in) x 23 centimetres (9.1 in)) dated between the 2nd and 3rd centuries AD depicting on both faces typical scenes of Mithraism. It was discovered at Fiano Romano in 1926 and then, in 1939, it was acquired by the Louvre Museum in Paris.

== Culture ==
=== Events ===
==== September Feast in honor of Our Lady of Sorrows ====
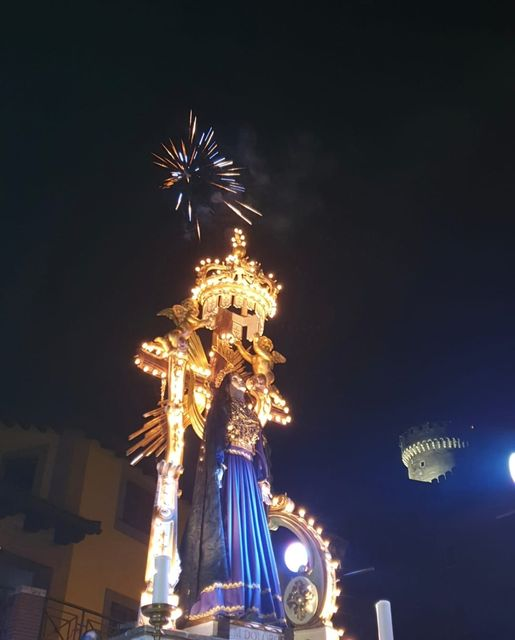
Statue of Our Lady of Sorrows during the procession at Fiano Romano

The September Feast in honor of Our Lady of Sorrows is an event organized on the third Sunday of September in Fiano Romano in which religious traditions are relived and important celebrations and folkloristic activities take place. The 179th edition of the festival was held in 2021.

The roots of the festival date back to 24 March 1842 when the wax image of the Holy Mary of Sorrows, dressed in satin, purchased with the offerings of the Fianesi faithful, was placed in the Church of Santo Stefano Nuovo and the diocesan bishop granted the indulgence of 40 days to all the faithful every time they visited the sacred image. In the same year the Feast of Our Lady of Sorrows was solemnized, entrusted to the women of the Pia Union of Our Lady of Sorrows (only starting from 1933 was also allowed to men to take part in the organization of the feast). After a few years of interruption, the feast was restored at the request of the faithful in 1879 and for the occasion a silk mantle embroidered in gold was purchased to embellish the image of the Madonna and, in the following years, objects were purchased and offered by the faithful of various kinds to adorn the statue. Suspended again for a few years, in 1889 the feast was resumed again and has never been interrupted since then (for example, in 1942 due to the war only religious rites were performed).

From the 1960s the organization of the celebrations passed to the ProLoco Association (association promoting local culture and tourism) and took its current name of September Festival in honor of Our Lady of Sorrows and is organized, together with the Pia Union and the Municipal Administration, every year on the third Sunday of September. The feast begins on Thursday or Friday, the streets of the town are adorned with lights, masses and other religious moments are held in honor of Our Lady of Sorrows and moments of entertainment and socialization are also organized (sports tournaments, performance of singers, cabaret shows, games for children, popular games, horse races, rides, etc...).

The festival culminates with the Procession on Sunday evening in which the statue of Our Lady of Sorrows is taken out of the Church of Santo Stefano Nuovo, once in the year, and is carried through the streets of the town, preceded by the Pia Union, accompanied by the musical band, followed by religious, military and civil authorities as well as by many faithful. Before her return to the Church, Our Lady of Sorrows is celebrated by a grandiose fireworks show in front of the Ducal Castle and the medieval village and, at the end of this show, all the gathered faithful greet her shouting Viva Maria. The feast ends with the blessing of the faithful by the priest in front of the entrance of the Church of Santo Stefano Nuovo before the statue makes its return into it.

== Transport ==
- At Fiano Romano there is the exit of the A1 highway from which the northbound branch (named A1 dir Nord) connects it to the Rome ring-road Grande Raccordo Anulare;
- The municipal territory is crossed by the provincial road SP 15/A Tiberina which starts from Rome and runs through the Tiber valley, on the path of ancient Via Tiberina;
- Immediately beyond the Tiber passes the state highway Strada statale 4 Via Salaria, easily reachable from Fiano Romano via the dual carriageway state highway Strada statale 4 dir;
- The railway station closest to Fiano Romano is that of Fara in Sabina of the FL1 Fiumicino Airport - Orte regional line, about 9 kilometres (5.6 mi) away and connected by shuttle buses.

== Bibliography ==
- Boenzi, Giuliana; Ciccarese, Antonella; Di Giammatteo, Paola; Fei, Francesca; Gazzetti, Gianfranco; Stanco, Enrico Angelo (1997). Terra di Fiano : ricerche di storia, arte, archeologia (in Italian). Quasar.
- Callegari Cavaliere, Paola; Ferilli, Giuliano; Giancamilli, Edgardo (2015). Fiano Romano. Dalla preistoria ai giorni nostri (in Italian). De Angelis.
- Marzano, Annalisa (2007). Roman villas in central Italy : a social and economic history. Boston: Brill.
- Ercoli, Giuseppe (1996). Fiano Romano nella storia (in Italian). Fiano Romano: Pro Loco Fiano Romano.
