= Via Tiberina =

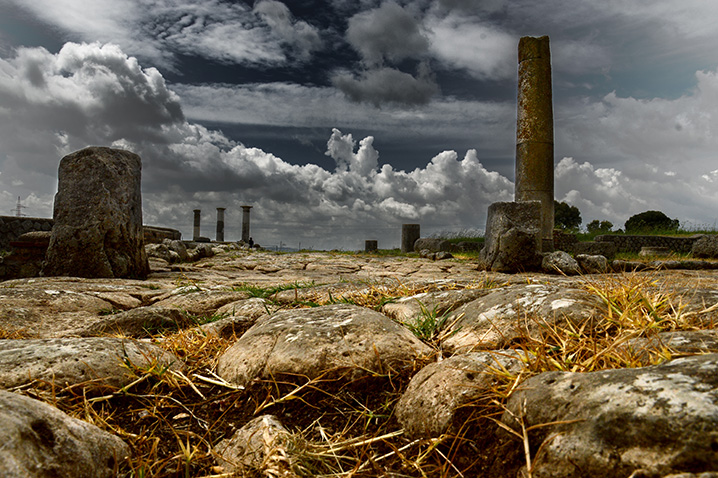
Remains of paved road at Lucus Feroniae.

The via Tiberina was an ancient Roman road, which from the north of Rome, going up the right bank of the Tiber river, crossed the ancient center of Veio, Capena and Falerii Veteres countryside to Tiber Valley and continued towards Ocriculum, today in Umbria. Today, in the metropolitan city of Rome Capital, its route coincides with the provincial road 15 / A Tiberina.

== History ==
The via Tiberina, which owes its name to its path that follows that of the Tiber river, is one of the oldest roads in the area north of Rome: although there are references to it only in documents from the Constantinian era, its use is testified since prehistoric times, as a set of sheep tracks that connected the archaic centers located along the river, thus playing the role of a way of great communication, similarly to what happened on the other side with the Via Salaria.

It is also hypothesized that the Tiberina coincided in the area with the ancient Via Campana, a road used by the Etruscans since the 7th century BC to transport inland the salt extracted to the salt-field at the mouth of the Tiber.

During the 4th century BC Rome, having definitively defeated the city of Veii and its Faliscan and Capenate allies, moved to the permanent and systematic conquest and occupation of the territory of the defeated: the Tiberina was readapted to the new Roman needs, also modifying the ancient layout that in fact, it took the path it has maintained until the modern era. The Roman restructuring work in many points exceeded the limits due to the orography of the territory in favor of direct connections between the centers of greater importance, as evidenced for example by the straight section between the locality of Scorano and the current city of Fiano Romano, completely coinciding with that of the Roman era.

Although it lost part of its importance as a connection with Umbria and the upper Sabina with the construction of the Via Flaminia, around 220 BC, the Tiberina nevertheless remained, both in the republican and in the imperial age, a rapid and safe to transport the products of the surrounding fertile territory to the Roman market, as well as a necessary support for river navigation and with a local viability function.

And this function of connection between the area of the western side of the lower Tiber valley and Rome remained unchanged for the following centuries, thus representing the Tiberina one of the main roads for all the centers of the area up to the modern age.

== Route ==
In the Republican era, the Tiberina departed from the Pons Sublicius which allowed the passage on the right bank of the Tiber, downstream of the Tiber Island.

Later, with the construction of the Flaminia, the route of the two roads was common from Ponte Milvio to Prima Porta (ad gallinas albas): here, immediately after the bridge over the ditch of Prima Porta, the Tiberina branched off continuing to follow the course of the river and crossing the ancient ager capenate arriving at the sanctuary of Lucus Feroniae. From here it continued, always along the Tiber, towards the area of the current Ponzano Romano until it crosses the Treja river near Falerii Veteres (Civita Castellana). Here it was divided in two: one branch joined directly with the via Flaminia near Borghetto, probably while another crossed the Tiber reaching the ancient center of Poggio Sommavilla and Foglia, continuing on the left bank, rejoined the Flaminia just south of Ocriculum.

Along the route of the Tiberina there are many and very significant archaeological sites, such as the sanctuary of Lucus Feroniae and a lot of villas rustica among which the Villa dei Volusii stands out in Fiano Romano, which testify how it connected important centers of primary importance for the history of the area.

== Bibliography ==
- Radke, Gerhard (1981). Viae Publicae Romanae (in Italian). Translated by Sigismondi, Gino. Bologna: Cappelli Editore.
- Gamurrini, Gian Francesco (1972). Carta archeologica d'Italia : 1881-1897 : materiali per l'Etruria e la Sabina (in Italian). Firenze: L.S. Olschki.
- Pani, Giacomo (1995). Capena e il suo territorio (in Italian). Dedalo.
- Jones, G. D .B. (1963). Capena and the Ager Capenas. Vol. 31. Papers of the British School at Rome. Jones.
- Natale, Maria Teresa (1993). Via Flaminia, via Tiberina : da Porta del Popolo a Rignano Flaminio, Lucus Feroniae, Prima Porta (in Italian). Bonsignori.
- Gazzetti, Gianfranco; Gallavotti Cavallero, Daniela; Aiello, Maurizio (1992). Il territorio capenate (in Italian). Quasar.
- Romani, Felice; Peracchi, Antonio (1828). Supplimento al dizionario storico-mitologico compilato dal profes. Felice Romani e dal dot. Antonio Peracchi (in Italian).
