= Lucus Feroniae =

Archaeological site in Capena, Italy

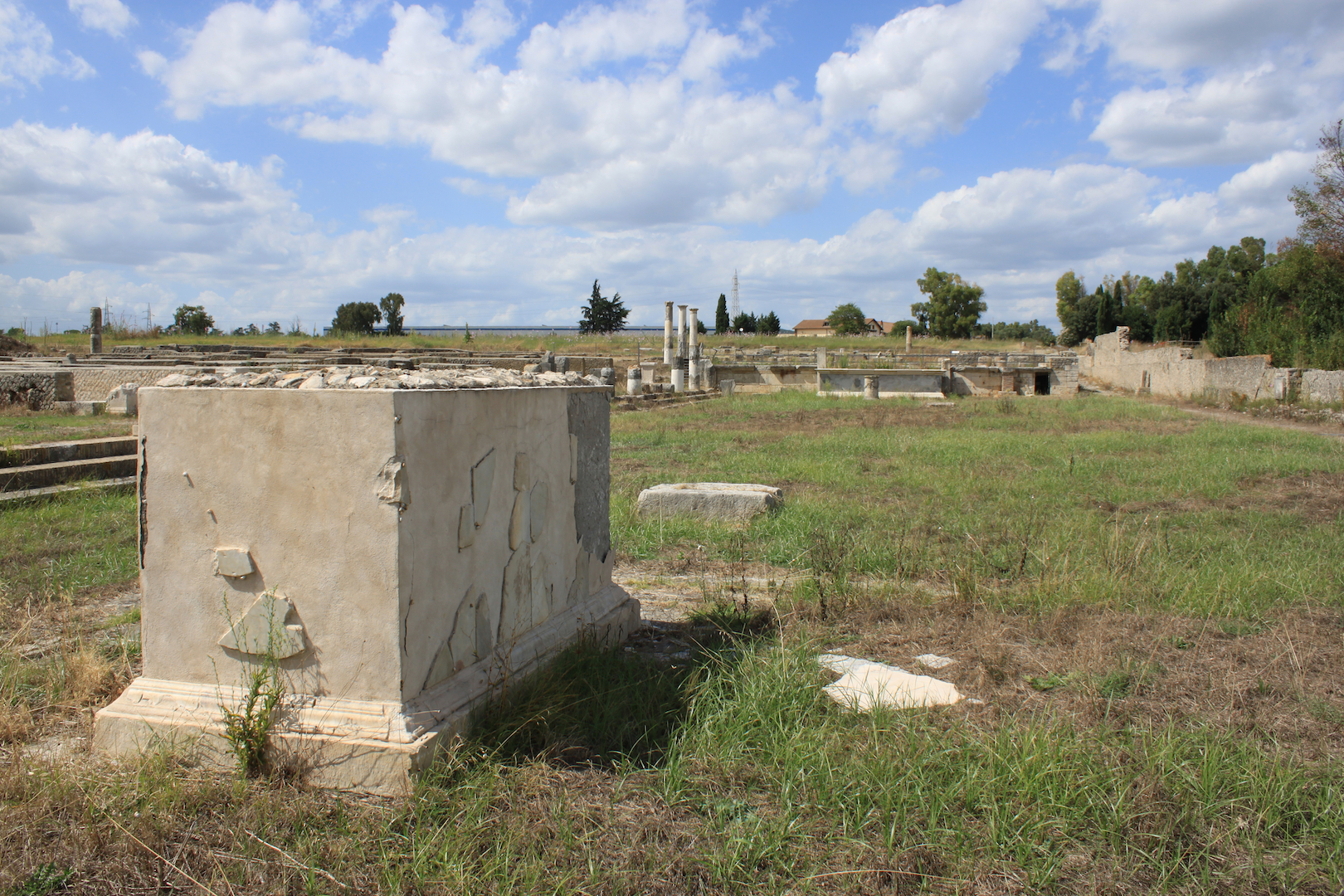
- View of the archaeological site of Lucus Feroniae

- Location within Lazio
- 42°07′48″N 12°35′48″E
- Type: Settlement
- Periods: Roman Republic Roman Empire
- Cultures: Ancient Rome
- Location: Lazio, Italy
- Region: Provincia di Roma

Site notes
- Public access: yes

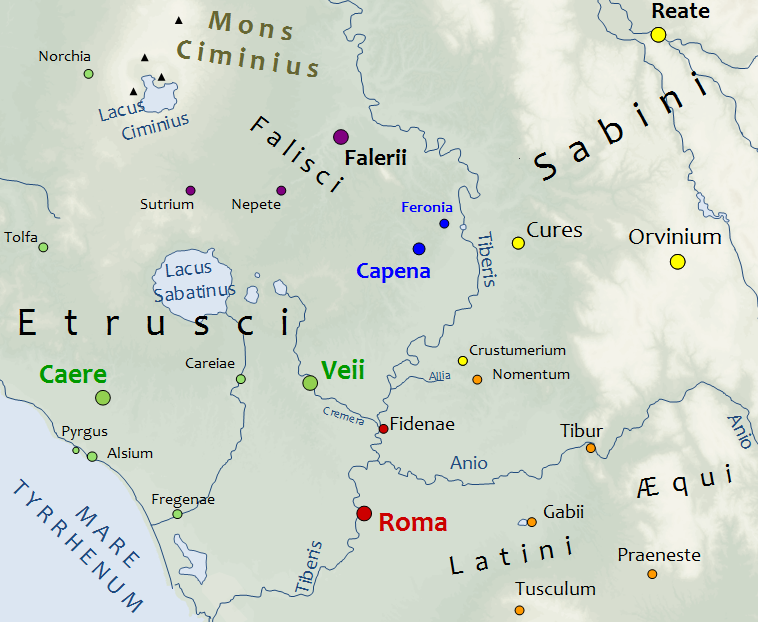
Map of Latium 400 BC

Lucus Feroniae was an ancient sanctuary or, literally sacred grove ("lucus"), dedicated to the Sabine goddess Feronia, protector of freedmen, ex-slaves. It was located near to the ancient town of Feronia in Etruria on the ancient Via Tiberina, in what is now the territory of the modern commune of Capena, Lazio.

It was partially excavated when the A1 Rome-Milan motorway which crosses it was built, and the archaeological site is adjacent to that of the ancient Roman Villa dei Volusii.

The sanctuary was located near the later port on the Tiber, facing the Sabine settlement of Cures nearby. Later the forum was built on its south side.

== History ==
According to the 1st-century BCE Greek historian Dionysius of Halicarnassus, there was a sanctuary dedicated to Feronia that was honored by both the Sabines and the Latins. Dionysius records that there was a festival at this temple, during the days of which many would travel there from surrounding cities with either the religious goal of offering sacrifices or performing vows, or for the commercial goal of selling their goods as merchants, artisans, or farmers. Archaeological excavation at the site has confirmed the presence of rings, seals, numerous coins—many of which originate from Campania—and also pottery, sometimes brought from elsewhere, but also sometimes produced locally either for dedications or trade.

This festival of Feronia is perhaps the very same as the annual ceremony at Soracte honoring the goddess described by the 1st-century BCE geographer Strabo, who claims that the ceremony was attended by a great multitude of people. According to Strabo, individuals possessed by Feronia could perform acts of firewalking, and this feat was supposedly performed at the festival, thus attracting many visitors who wished to view the stunt. It is, however, possible that Strabo merely confused the festival of Feronia with the nearby festival of Apollo Soranus, which was also situated on Mount Soracte, and—according to Pliny the Elder—also the location of a firewalking ritual. There is no inscriptional evidence attesting to worship of Feronia at Soracte, save for possibly one text now stored at Nepi that was—according to the Italian archaeologist Fulvio Orsini—found at this mountain. However, earlier accounts of this same text provide no indication that the artifact was not discovered at Nepi, allowing for the possibility that Orsini simply assumed that the text derives from Soracte on the basis of the connection between the mountain and Feronia in Roman literary sources.

Both Dionysius and Livy, another 1st-century BCE historian, recount a story wherein a diplomatic incident between the Romans and the Sabines occurred at this site, eventually sparking war. According to Livy, Tullus Hostilius, a legendary king of Rome, justified war with the Sabines on the basis of the supposed seizure of Roman merchants at a shrine ("fanum") of Feronia by the site. More specifically, Dionysius writes that the Sabines supposedly imprisoned and seized the wealth of a group of prominent Romans and later refused to release them when a Roman delegation came to address the issue. Both Livy and Dionysius record that, in their defense, the Sabines alleged that their own refugees had been resettled in Rome. Ultimately, this issue provided the necessary pretext for Tullus Hostilius to justify war with the Sabines. In any case, if this story is accurate, then it showcases that the grove existed already in the 7th-century BCE.

Livy records that Hannibal, in the year 211 BC, sacked the grove, which was supposedly renowned for its wealth at the time as the local Capenate populace furnished the site with donations of gold, silver, first fruits, and other offerings. However, the Carthaginian soldiers supposedly left large heaps of bronze behind out of fear of divine retribution. Silius Italicus, a 1st-century CE Roman author, recounts the same story, mentioning in his account that the temple's wealth had allegedly grown steadily over ages purely on the backs of countless gifts and offerings, and the no one had yet dared violate this grove purely on account of fear. Archaeological analysis of the site has unearthed architectural terracottas, providing evidence that the sanctuary was in some way rebuilt or restored during the early 2nd-century BCE.

The rebuilt sanctuary was, according to Livy, struck by lightning in 196 BC. The town surrounding the sanctuary was developed with rectangular insulae and streets probably through Gnaeus Egnatius, governor of Macedonia and builder of the via Egnatia.

Between 143 and 129 BC the sanctuary was rebuilt in stone as a Hellenistic temple of Corinthian order and with porticos surrounding the sacred area. It was later destroyed perhaps in the Social Wars as were many other Italic sanctuaries after 90 BC.

One inscription from the site records an individual named Marcus Silius Epaphroditus, who supposedly funded the construction of an amphitheater at the town. This same inscription also refers to the settlement as Colonia Julia Felix Lucoferonensi, proving that—during the Imperial era, a colony was founded at the site. Given that another known Colonia Iulia Felix (modern Sinop) on the Black Sea was founded by Julius Caesar in the 47 BCE, and that Cicero—in a letter dated to 46 BCE—implies that Caesar was specifically surveying land at Capena for the purpose of resettling his veterans, it is possible that colony was founded by Julius Caesar for this exact reason. Pliny the Elder, a 1st-century CE Roman author, includes the site amongst a list of several other Augustan colonies, potentially implying that Augustus was involved in its establishment, perhaps whilst still a triumvir or whilst reigning as Roman emperor.

Even more specifically, it is probable that the colony was founded around 47-46 BCE, for the aforementioned letter of Cicero and the founding of the colony at Sinop are also dated to that same time frame. Moreover, the appearance of the word Felix in the name of the settlement may connect to the contemporary association between the cult of Felicitas and of Venus, the mythical progenitor of the Julii family to which Caesar belonged. For instance, one coin dated to 47 BCE showcases, on its obverse, the head of Felicitas beneath the Latin word Felicitatis ("of Felicitas"), and—on its reverse—it portrays the goddess Victoria riding a biga. Victoria herself was featured prominently in the Ludi Victoriae Caesaris, a series of games organized by Julius Caesar that are otherwise referred to in ancient sources as the Ludi Veneris Genetricis. The founding of a colony at the site is reflected in the archaeological record by the remains of a small town including numerous civic buildings, such as an aqueduct. One inscription from the 3rd-century CE records a veteran of Augustus and member of the Voltinia tribe whose native town was Lucus Feroniae.

== The site ==
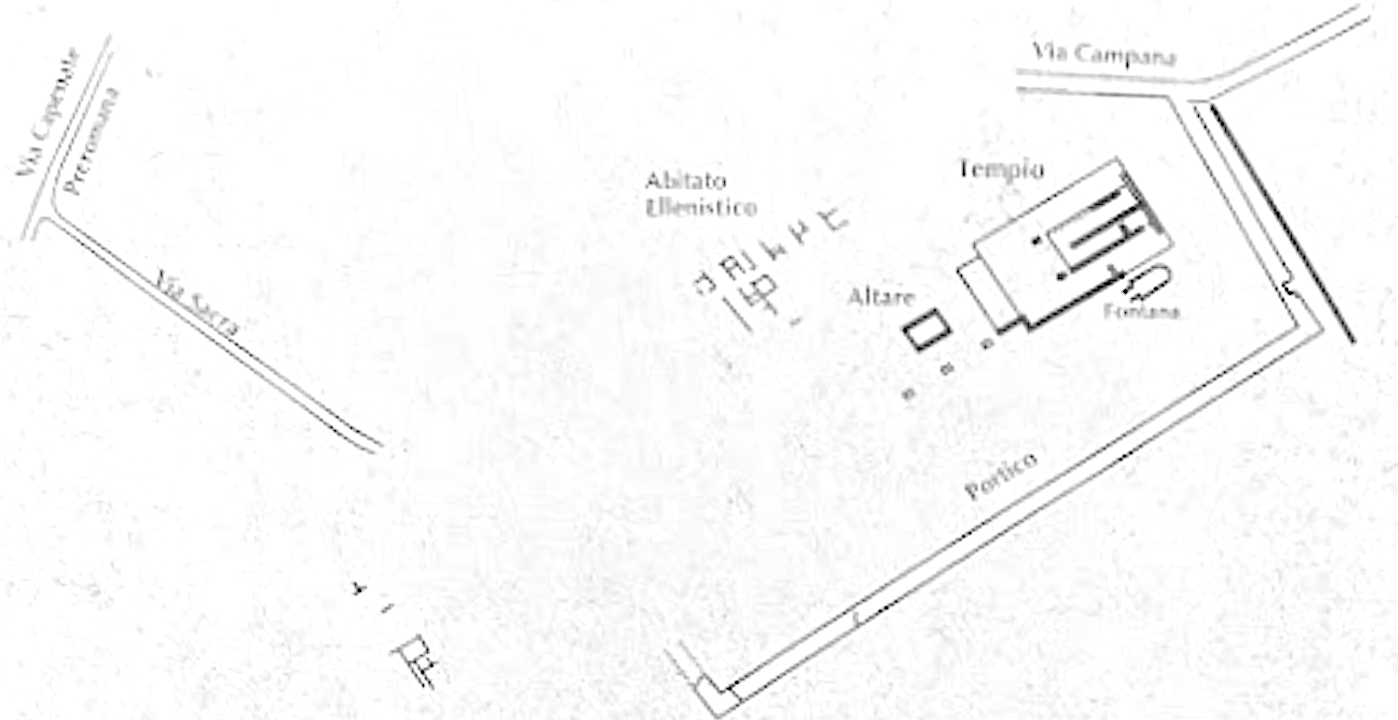
Plan of the sanctuary

The site was first discovered in 1953 and explored by the Soprintendenza Archeologia, Belle Arti e Paesaggio per l’area metropolitana di Roma, la Provincia di Viterbo e l’Etruria Meridionale.

Archaeological excavations at the site unearthed, besides a sanctuary, a small town containing a forum. The forum was unpaved and built on a north-south axis, to the west of which lay a colonnade consisting of Tuscan columns, itself in front of a set of tabernae. East of the forum, there was a reticulate wall supporting a part of the Aqua Augusta. Various sacred buildings were situated to the north of the forum, such as the altar of Feronia, a small Classical temple, an aerarium, a travertine podium connected to a basilica, and an Augusteum. Moreover, in 1961, researchers unearthed evidence of a Republican-period temple to the east of the forum. The town lies at the intersection of two roads, known respectively as the Via Capenate and the Via Tiberina. The Via Tiberina extends westward from the forum, eventually joining with the Via Capenate. In the space between these two roads, west of the forum, there lies an amphitheater dated, on account of its building materials—particularly the usage of opus reticulatum with tufa quoins—to the early 1st-century CE. The amphitheater underwent later repairs during the early 2nd-century CE, as indicated by the presence of brick stamps.

According to a magnetometry survey of the area, there exists, to the east of the Via Tiberina and to the north of the forum, two distinct sets of linear "anomalies." In one group, which is placed slightly closer to the road, the lines are oriented in northeast-southwest fashion, and—in terms of dimensions—are 0.9 metres (35 in) in width and each spaced about 5 metres (16 ft) apart from each other. The area between each of these linear features includes circular cuts, all of which measure around 1 metre (3.3 ft) in diameter. Similarly, the second set of linear anomalies—this one located slightly further to the east, away from the road—also consists of lines interspersed with circular cuts. However, in this case, the lines are oriented northwest-southeast and are instead about 0.6 metres (24 in) wide and are placed about 2.7 metres (110 in) apart from each other. In the second set, the circles are all around 0.8 metres (31 in) in diameter and appear regularly at intervals of 1.5 metres (59 in). Further examples of the exact same parallel linear features appear in the northwest section of the site—more specifically, to the north of the western extension of the Via Capenate. Collectively, the linear features likely all represent cuts in bedrock, itself probably an indication of agricultural activity. However, the archaeologist G.D.B Jones argues that the land by the Lucus Feroniae was likely not fertile in antiquity on account of the thin topsoil, which in some cases is as narrow as 20–30 centimetres (7.9–11.8 in). In modern times, deep ploughing has significantly ameliorated the condition of the topsoil alongside the roads, though the rest of the land remains of poor quality.

Additional evidence of agriculture perhaps appears in the form of the various cisterns present at the sanctuary, some of which are located to the west of the aforementioned third group of linear features. Several of these northwestern cisterns intersect at almost a right angle with another series of linear features that, in this case, may attest to a type of irrigation system. However, according to the archaeologists Stephen Kay, Sophie Hay, and Christopher Smith, since these lines appear to cut across the cultivation area, they may postdate agricultural activity. One particular rectangular structure in the northwestern area, which may represent either a cistern or a building foundation, displays a lower magnetic field at the center, perhaps due to the usage of a different construction material. Another cistern lies in the southeastern part of the site, specifically to the south of a 23-by-127-metre (75 ft × 417 ft) rectilinear structure situated to the east of the forum.

The southern area of the site contains a plethora of rectilinear buildings located beside two separate branching extensions of the Via Tiberina. These structures are identified magnetometrically by positive and negative linear features, of which the positive linear anomalies likely represent fired construction material, such as roof tiles, whereas the strong negative linear features probably reflect walls. Some specific structures located east of the Via Tiberina measure about 11–29 metres (36–95 ft) in length and are marked by open spaces separating the buildings. These structures are similar to another set of buildings from the eastern part of the central area of the site that are also characterized by wide open spaces dividing the constructions. According to Kay, Hay, and Smith, it is therefore possible that, in both parts of the site, these particular structures fulfilled the same function, which was perhaps to section off certain open areas such as courtyards, gardens, or spaces dedicated to production. Within the open spaces of the central area, there is located two dipolar anomalies that may represent kilns, indicating that this area was used for some sort of production.

Inscriptions show that the sanctuary or lucus of Feronia lay behind the eastern wall of the forum and was accessible through a small portico built in the early Augustan period by the duumvir A. Ottavius.

== See also ==
- Lucus Pisaurensis
