= Veii =

Ancient Etruscan city in Isola Farnese, Italy

- Veio
- Veius
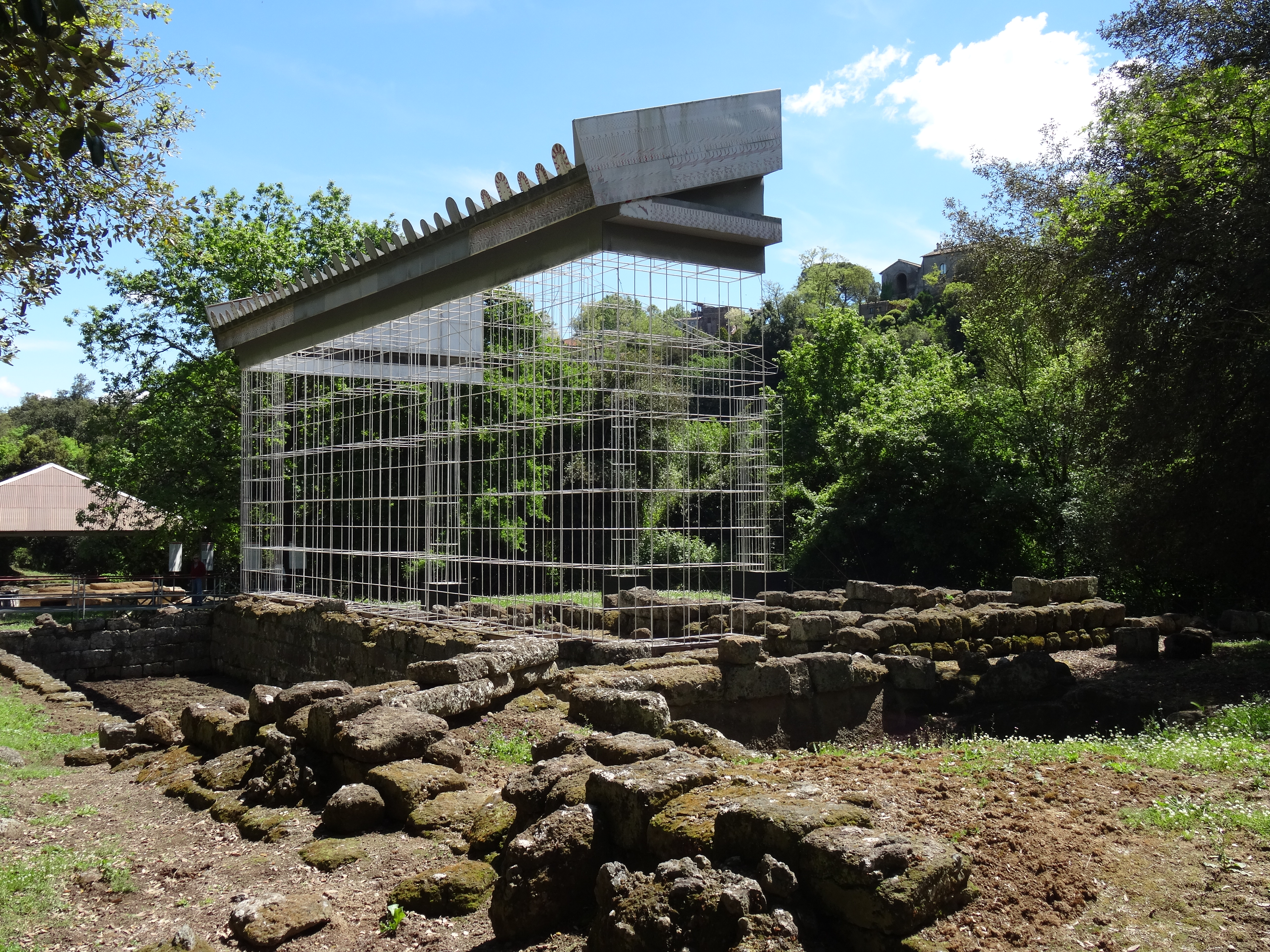
- Ruins of the temple of Veii

- Location within Italy
- 42°01′24″N 12°23′23″E
- Type: Settlement
- Location: Isola Farnese, Metropolitan City of Rome Capital, Lazio, Italy
- Region: Latium

History
- Event: Battle of Veii

Site notes
- Area: 190 ha (470 acres)
- Condition: Ruined
- Owner: Public
- Management: Soprintendenza per i Beni Archeologici dell'Etruria Meridionale
- Public access: Yes
- Website: Area archeologica di Veio (in Italian)

Veii (also Veius; Italian: Veio) was an important ancient Etruscan city situated on the southern limits of Etruria and 16 km (9.9 mi) north-northwest of Rome, Italy. It now lies in Isola Farnese, in the comune of Rome. Many other sites associated with and in the city-state of Veii are in Formello, immediately to the north. Formello is named after the drainage channels that were first created by the Veians.

Veii was the richest city of the Etruscan League. It was alternately at war and in alliance with the Roman Kingdom and later Republic for over 300 years. It eventually fell in the Battle of Veii to Roman general Camillus's army in 396 BC. Veii continued to be occupied after its capture by the Romans.

The site is now a protected area, part of the Parco di Veio established by the regional authority of Lazio in 1997.

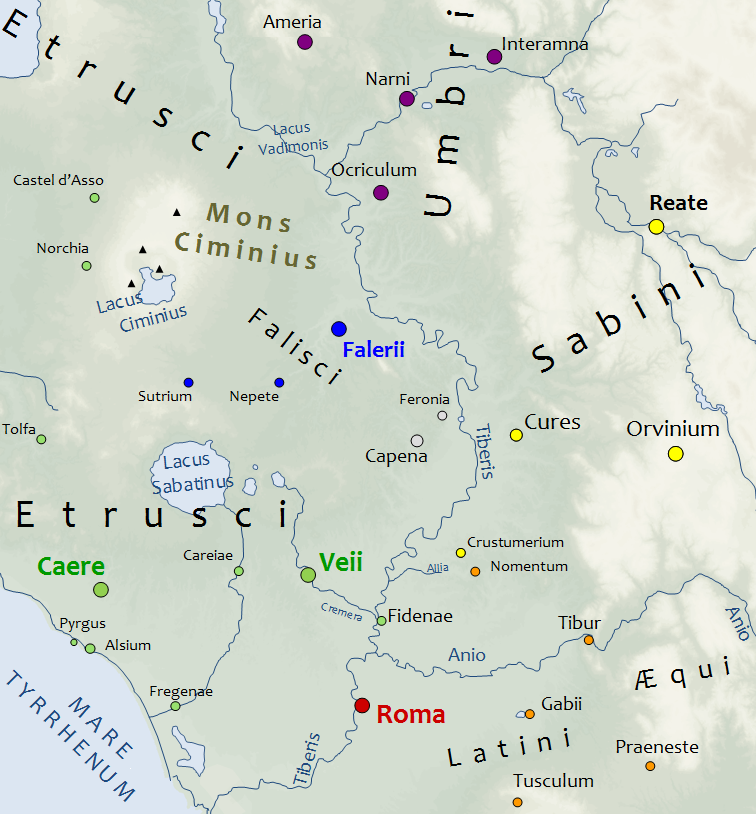
Neighbourhood of Veii in 450 BC

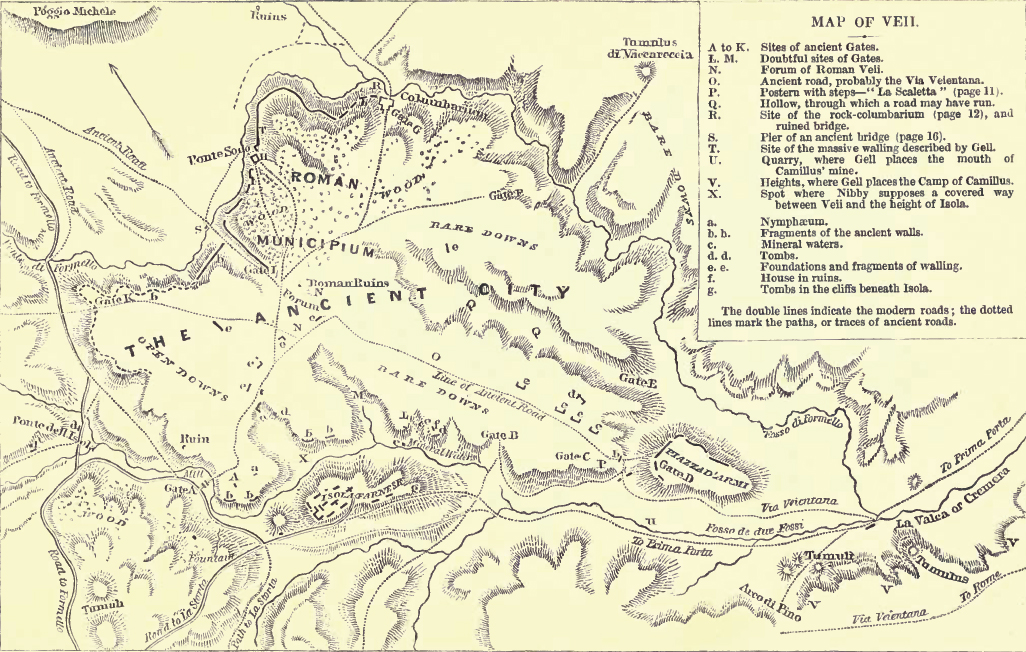
Site of Veii

== Site ==
=== City of Veii ===
The city of Veii lies mainly on a tuff plateau 190 hectares (470 acres) in area.

The Valchetta flows a few miles eastward to join the Tiber River on the south side of Labaro along the Via Flaminia and Veii's territory included this area.

Its proximity to the Tiber and the trade route to the interior, which became the Via Flaminia, augmented its prosperity. The Veiians were known to trade with the Greeks and Phoenicians. Many Grecian pottery shards have been found throughout the site, dating from as far back as the 8th century BC. Although the river brought wealth and affluence to Veii, it also placed it in competition with Rome for the domination of Latium.

The temple of Juno was the greatest and most honoured in the city.

The largest visible monument is the sanctuary of Minerva from the 7th c. BC, situated along an important route just outside the city (at modern Portonaccio). Prior to their influx of wealth around the 7th century BC, the people of Veii preferred to worship their gods and goddesses in the open air. Early "temples" consisted of small shrines surrounded by foliage. Due to their affinity to the stars, many Veiians preferred to worship under the night sky. Once the city began to prosper, an official temple was built of wood and stone. The sanctuary was one of the oldest and most revered in Etruria, standing out for its sumptuous polychrome terracotta decorations, many of which can be seen today in the Villa Giulia. The sanctuary included the temple of Apollo of about 510 BC to which belonged the Apollo of Veii (now in the National Etruscan Museum).

The impressive thermal baths and the forum built under Augustus have been partially excavated in recent years.

Many rich Tumuli and chamber tombs have been found. The most famous is the Grotta Campana uncovered in 1843, a chamber tomb with the oldest known Etruscan frescoes.

There are also long tunnels leading into the plateau of the city, which may corroborate Livy's account of the Roman victory in the Battle of Veii.

The walls of Veii, of which small sections remain, bordered the two intersecting streams using the streambeds as a ditch, with a wall across the plateau closing the triangle.

=== Piazza d'Armi ===
Every Etruscan stronghold was built on an elevation, and Veii was no exception. Its arx, or citadel, was placed on a bluff delineated by cliffs within the angle of confluence of the two streams, nearly separated from the main ridge by a gully, through which ran a road in the Roman period. An archaeological site, Piazza d'Armi ("military square"), marks the location today.

=== Etruscan League ===
Veii was the southeasternmost city of the Dodecapolis, the 12 cities of central Etruria commonly referred to as the Etruscan League. The league allowed the leaders of each city to come together and discuss a variety of topics. The city-states shared common religious practices, as well as different variations of the same language. The leaders met on a yearly basis at the Fanum Voltumnae Sanctuary in Velzna, or Volsinii near modern Orvieto.

=== Art ===
Veii's sculptures and statues were made of terracotta. Most ceramic vessels were decorated with intricate details. Depictions of the everyday life of Etruscans were very common. Many uncovered vases and bowls portray images of farmers harvesting crops and raising animals, as well as blacksmiths in the midst of working in a raging fire. Battle victories, as well as other accomplishments, were very popular subjects in funerary ceramics.

As population and wealth flourished within the city, the use of bronze became more and more common. The people of Veii first used metal for horse harnesses, weapons, fans, jewelry, and mirrors.

=== Burial practices ===
The use of burial and cremation altered depending on the stability of the settlement. In the early years, most citizens were cremated. As affluence increased, individuals were freer to bury their loved ones close by in order to visit them regularly. Burial sites dating back to the 9th century BC have been uncovered. As inhumation became more and more popular, the sarcophagi became more and more intricate. Through the use of terracotta, local sculptors began using their talents to add adornments around the coffins, creating detailed accounts of the deceased's life, as well as the deities that meant the most to them. Tombs were commonly decorated with sentimental objects, as well as items they may need in the afterlife.

During times of war or economic difficulty, the use of cremation rose. Unlike their ancestors, however, the people of Veii continued the tradition of burial by keeping the urns of their loved ones in miniature tombs. Like the sarcophagi, the urns were made of terracotta and depicted varying scenes important to the deceased individual. Items were still placed in the small tombs; however, the value of the objects steadily dropped as times of financial crisis continued.

=== Etruscan language ===
Over 10,000 Etruscan written pieces are known. Varying examples of Etruscan script have been uncovered all over the ancient world.

== History ==
=== Early history ===
The earliest evidence of occupation by demographic analysis, including that of the cemeteries, dates from the 10th century BC in the Late Bronze Age. Small settlements were scattered over a wider area than the plateau, and the population of the plateau at Veii is estimated to have been stable at about 1,000. In the 9th century BC, the Early Iron Age (Villanovan culture), the finds are localized to the plateau but appear to be associated with independent settlements, each with its own cemetery. Occupation gradually intensified in the 8th (remainder of Villanovan) and 7th (Orientalising period) centuries BC, by conurbation of the settlements as the site assumed an urban appearance with city blocks in a grid pattern arranged around a central square containing a water cistern. That evidence suggests that the city of Veii was shaped into its classical form in the 7th century BC by a population, presumably Etruscan, first settling there in the 10th century BC. During the settlement's early years, many homes were built in spherical shapes out of wood over a shallow trench and topped with a thatched roof. Up until the 7th century BC Veii had to depend on itself for the majority of its resources and goods. Many artisans found work in the textile industry, creating intricate wool designs for clothes and blankets. Further supporting their self-sufficiency, many yarn spools and loom weights have been discovered in the area.

The population of the early Veii practiced both inhumation and cremation within the same family. The proportion was 50% in the 9th century BC, after a predomination of cremation (90%) earlier. In the 8th century, inhumation rose to 70%, which may be attributable to an influence from Latium, where inhumation prevailed in the 9th century BC.

During the 9th and 8th centuries BC, the population density and grave goods were on the increase: more and wealthier people and also more of a disparity in wealth: the rise of a wealthier class. In the 8th century BC, both the potter's wheel and writing were introduced from Greece. During the entire period, the settlements translocated around the plateau; however, a settlement (Casale del Fosso) maintained a cemetery to the north of the plateau continuously from the late 9th century BC to the early 6th century BC.

=== Conflict with Rome ===
The documented history of Veii, like that of all Italian cities in their early centuries, is sparse and unreliable.

According to Livy (writing 700 years later) the Fidenates and the Veientes were defeated in a war with Rome during the reign of Rome's mythical first king, Romulus, in the 8th century BC.

Plutarch (writing even later in the 1st C. AD) says of them:

The first (to oppose Romulus) were the Veientes, a people of Tuscany (the site is now in Lazio), who had large possessions, and dwelt in a spacious city; they took occasion to commence a war, by claiming Fidenae as belonging to them....

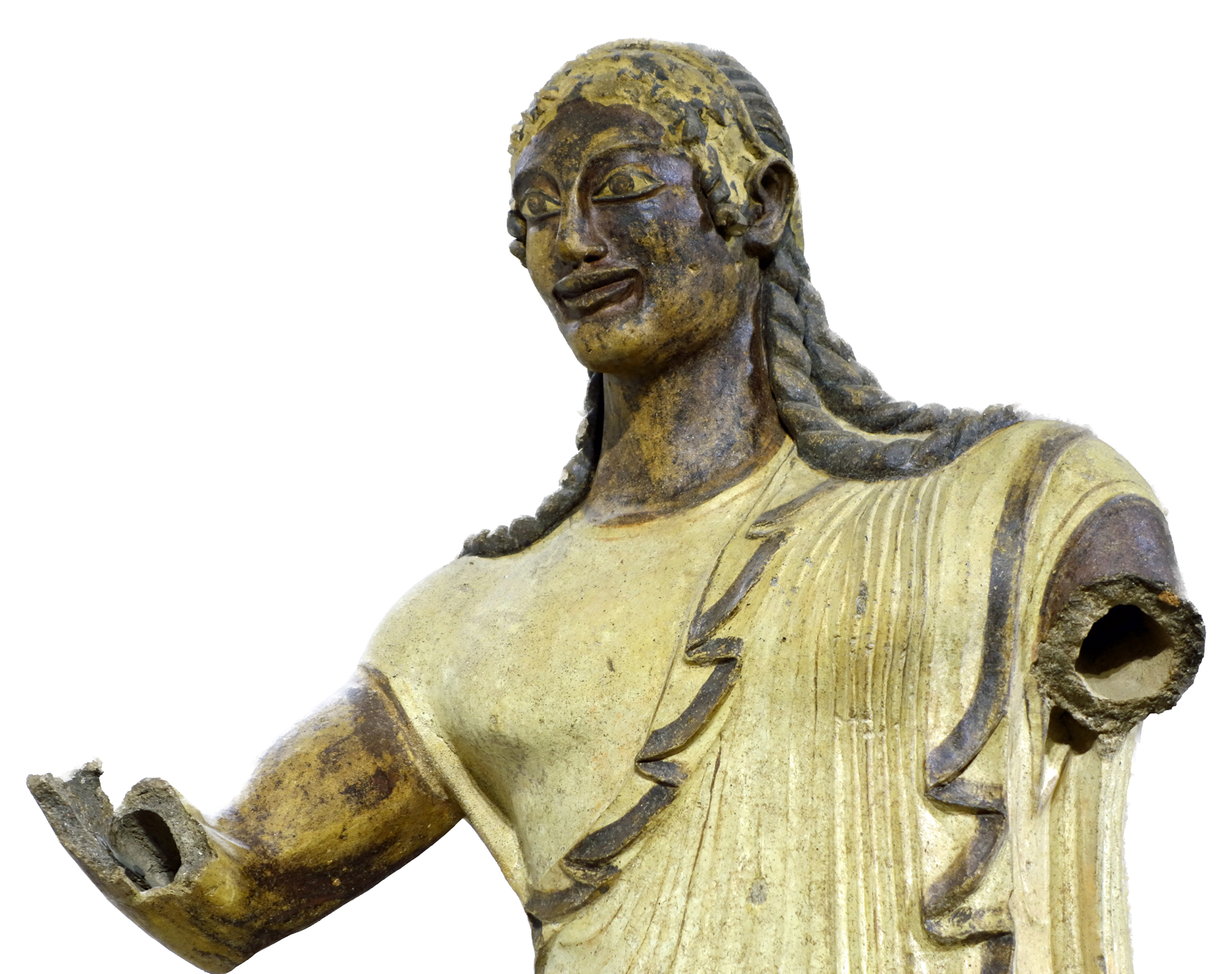
Apollo of Veii, dating from around 510 BC, in the Villa Giulia museum of Rome.

Fidenae and Veii were said to have again been defeated by Rome in the 7th century BC during the reign of Rome's third king Tullus Hostilius.

In the 6th century BC Rome's sixth king Servius Tullius warred against Veii (after the expiry of an earlier truce) and the Etruscans. He is said to have shown valour in the campaign, and to have routed a great army of the enemy. The war helped him to cement his position at Rome.

In 509 BC, after the overthrow of the Roman monarchy, the family of Tarquinius Superbus went into exile in Caere in Etruria. Tarquin sought to regain the throne, at first by the Tarquinian conspiracy and, when that failed, by force of arms. He convinced the cities of Tarquinii and Veii to support him, and led their armies against Rome in the Battle of Silva Arsia. The Roman army was victorious, and it is recorded by Livy that although the forces of Tarquinii fought well on the right wing, initially pushing back the Roman left wing, the Veientes on the left wing faltered and fled the battle, because they were accustomed to defeat at the hands of the Romans. After the loss of the battle the forces of Veii returned home. Livy writes that later in 509 BC, consul Publius Valerius Publicola returned to fight the Veientes.

In the 5th century BC, the Fabians, an aristocratic Roman family, moved into an Etruscan town just outside of Fidenae. Due to the sudden increase of wealth in the community, many Etruscan citizens began to worry about the impending fall of the economy. Soon, battles broke out on both sides, eventually leading to war. The sequence of events following the initial conflicts is widely considered to be a legend; it is said that the Veiian warriors murdered 300 Fabii, leaving all but one dead in order to incite fear in the rest of the community.

The most famous king of Veii was Lars Tolumnus whose family was part of the Veientine aristocracy and who instigated a war with Rome in 438 BC. The nearby Roman colony of Fidenae revolted against Rome and allied itself with Veii, giving Tolumnus control of the Fidenate army. The Romans sent four envoys to demand an explanation but they were murdered. Rome declared war against Veii and sent Lucius Sergius with an army who won the battle of Fidenae but the Roman losses were so high that a state of emergency was declared. A subsequent fiercely-fought battle with Veii in 437 BC reinforced by a contingent from Falerii was indecisive until the tribune Aulus Cornelius Cossus unhorsed Tolumnus and killed him with his spear.

In 406 BC, Rome declared war against Veii, still powerful and well-fortified, and her allies Falerii and Capena which required the Romans to commence a siege lasting many years. As Plutarch says:

Veii had been the capital of Etruria, not inferior to Rome, either in number of arms or multitude of soldiers, so that relying on her wealth and luxury, and priding herself upon her refinement and sumptuousness, she had engaged in many honourable contests with the Romans for glory and empire .......... as the city was furnished with all sorts of weapons, offensive and defensive, likewise with corn and all manner of provisions, they cheerfully endured a siege

After ten years, in 396 BC, the Romans appointed Camillus as dictator. After defeating both Falerii and Capena at Nepete, Camillus commanded the final strike against Veii (Battle of Veii). He dug into the soft tuff rock below the walls whilst distracting the Veiians with attacks on the walls and infiltrated the city's drainage system to emerge in the citadel, leading to their defeat. Not interested in surrender but only in Veii's complete destruction, the Romans slaughtered the entire adult male population and made slaves of all the women and children. The plunder was very rich and extensive, including the statue of Juno taken to Rome. The statue was dedicated to the Temple of Juno Regina (Aventine).

Camillus supported the patricians in opposing the plebeian plan to populate Veii with half of the city of Rome designed to resolve poverty and space issues. Camillus deliberately protracted the project until its abandonment.

=== Roman and later history ===
The city was soon assimilated under Roman control and is termed "Roman Veii" as opposed to "Etruscan Veii" by scholarly literature. Under the empire the Romans called the city the Municipium Augustum Veiens. The city never recovered its former wealth or its population after the Roman conquest. Nevertheless, after Rome's defeat in the battle of the Allia, many Roman soldiers fled there, and a project was proposed for abandoning Rome for Veii; this project was successfully opposed by Camillus.

The Romans built wealthy villas in the region and Livia had an estate there, according to Suetonius.

Veii was eventually abandoned after Roman times, and everything of value or utility was removed by anyone with access to the site. Finally it was filled and smoothed for ploughland and was forgotten until its rediscovery in the 17th century by the antiquarian Raffaello Fabretti.

=== Ager Veientanus ===
The territory of a city-state anywhere within the Roman domain was, in Roman legal terminology, an ager. The law made a number of fine distinctions, but by ager it meant primarily ager publicus, "public territory", the land belonging to the state, which in those times was primarily agricultural (ager is "field"). The ager Veientanus (i.e. of Veii) covered the entire region between the right bank of the lower Tiber river and the coast; that is all of southern Etruria. The northwest border was probably as far west as the Monti Sabatini and Lake Bracciano in the north. In Etruscan times the ager Veiantanus shared the countryside with the Silva Ciminia, the remnant of an ancient forest, of which the Romans stood in superstitious dread.

The ager Veiantanus remained for the most part agrarian until it became evident after World War II that the city of Rome was going to expand into and develop that area as a suburb. Moreover, a new method of ploughing was turning over the soil a metre deep, destroying all surface evidence. John Bryan Ward-Perkins, then Director of the British School at Rome, set into motion the South Etruria Survey (1954–1968), which cataloged all the visible antiquities in the ager Veientanus. It was published in 1968.

Nearly 30 years later, in 1997, the Italian government moved to protect a part of that area, creating the Veio Regional Natural Park of 14,984 hectares (37,030 acres) between the Via Cassia on the west, the Via Flaminia on the east, the Via Campagnanese on the north and the city of Rome on the south. Within the park are the comuni of Campagnano di Roma, Castelnuovo di Porto, Formello, Magliano Romano, Mazzano Romano, Morlupo, Riano, Sacrofano and Municipio XX of the city of Rome.

== See also ==
- Apollo of Veii
- Etruscan Civilization
- Lars Tolumnius
- Portonaccio (Veio)
- Roman Republic
- Silva Ciminia
- Roman-Etruscan Wars
- Archaeological area of Poggio Sommavilla
- Tiber Valley

== Bibliography ==
- Dennis, George (2009) [1848]. "Chapter I Veii – The City". The Cities and Cemeteries of Etruria. London, Chicago: John Murray, LacusCurtius.
- "The Park of Veio: Our concern" (PDF). Parco Regionale di Veio. Archived from the original (PDF) on 22 July 2011.
- Hemphill, Patricial (Winter 1970). "An Archaeological Survey of Southern Etruria" (PDF). Expedition. Archived from the original (PDF) on 28 May 2022.
- Quilici, L., S. Quilici Gigli, R. Talbert, T. Elliott, S. Gillies (3 May 2021). "Places: 423116 (Veii)". Pleiades.
