= Capena =

- Comune
- Comune di Capena
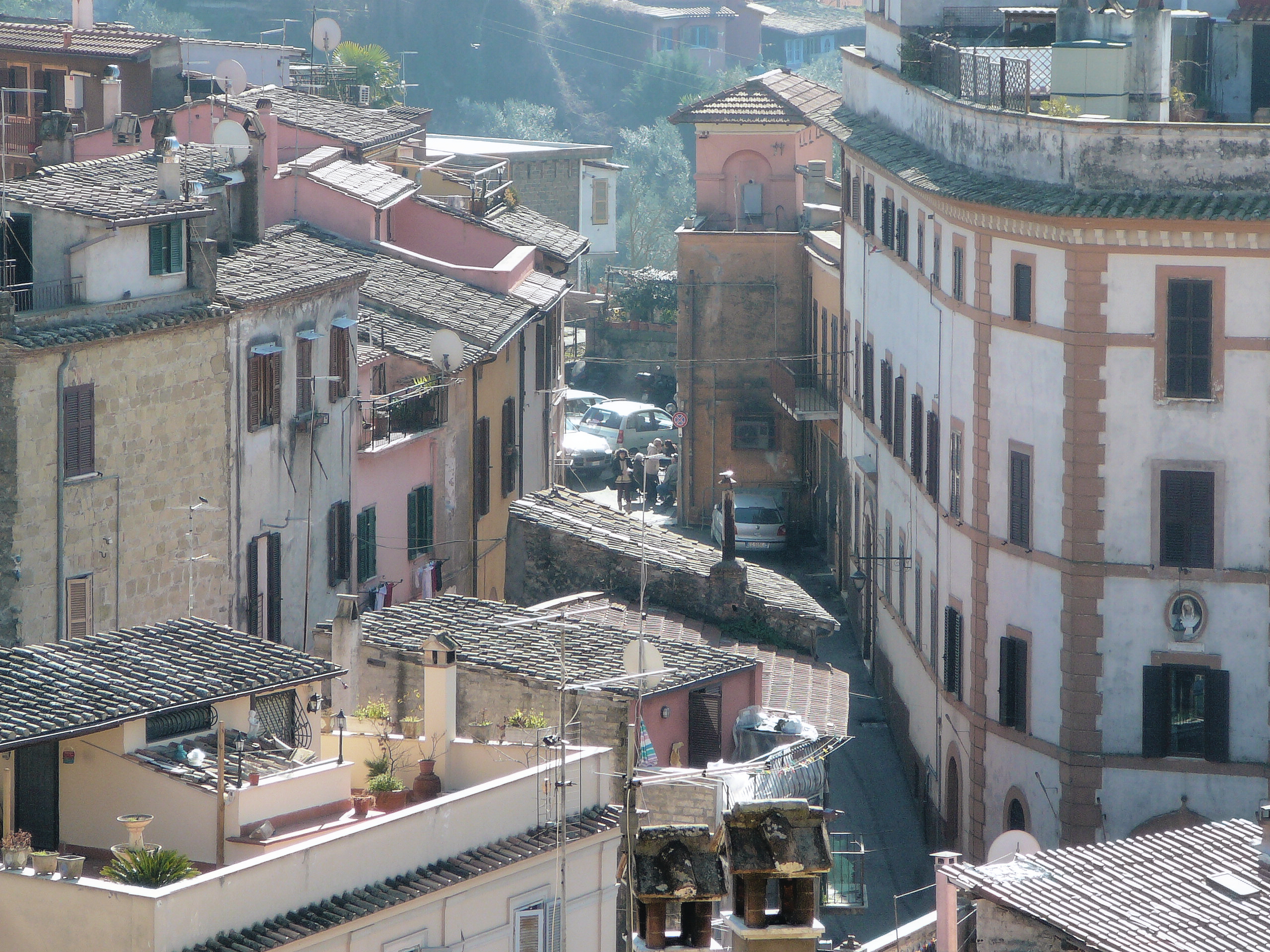
- View down Via Fausto Cecconi

- Coat of arms

- Location within Italy Location within Lazio
- Coordinates: 42°08′25″N 12°32′25″E
- Country: Italy
- Region: Lazio
- Metropolitan city: Rome

Government
  - Mayor: Roberto Barbetti

Area
  - Total: 29.51 km^{2} (11.39 sq mi)
- Elevation: 160 m (520 ft)

Population (31 May 2017)
  - Total: 10,699
  - Density: 362.6/km^{2} (939.0/sq mi)
- Demonym: Capenati
- Time zone: UTC+1 (CET)
  - Summer (DST): UTC+2 (CEST)
- Postal code: 00060
- Dialing code: 06
- Patron saint: St. Luke
- Saint day: October 18
- Website: Official website

Capena (until 1933 called Leprignano) is a town and comune in the Metropolitan City of Rome, Lazio region (central Italy). The town has borrowed its modern name from a pre-Roman and Roman settlement that was 3 kilometres (1.9 mi) to its north.

== Geography ==
Capena is located 26.2 kilometres (16.3 mi) north of Rome (as the crow flies), above the valley of the Tiber. The old quarter stands on a hill overlooking the valley of the Fosso di Morlupo to the west, while the modern district extends into the eastern plain.

The neighbouring towns are Castelnuovo di Porto, Civitella San Paolo, Fiano Romano, Monterotondo, Morlupo and Rignano Flaminio.

== History ==
=== Ancient era ===
The original Capena occupied the plateau of a nowadays uninhabited hill called La Civitucola, which is about 4 miles (6.4 km) northeast of a post station on the ancient Via Flaminia. Its territory was known in ancient times as the Ager Capenas, which was a Faliscan area adjacent (and culturally allied) to Etruria. It is frequently mentioned alongside of Veii, Falerii and Lucus Feroniae.

Ancient Capena seems to have been ruthlessly sacked by the Romans sometime around 390 BC, following a long campaign of resistance by the Capenates to the ever-growing influence of Rome in the area. In later republican times the city itself is hardly mentioned, but under the empire a municipium Capenatium foederatum is frequently mentioned in inscriptions. Of these several were found upon the Civitucola hill.

The settlement continued to exist until the collapse of the Western Roman Empire, after which all traces of it were lost. It was not until the pioneering work of Pierluigi Galletti in the mid-18th century that Capena's former location was identified. Even then, it took more than a hundred years for other historians to reach a consensus that Galletti had been correct.

Recent archaeological studies have revealed that ancient Capena may have retained a vibrant urban life and some degree of regional significance for longer than had previously been believed.

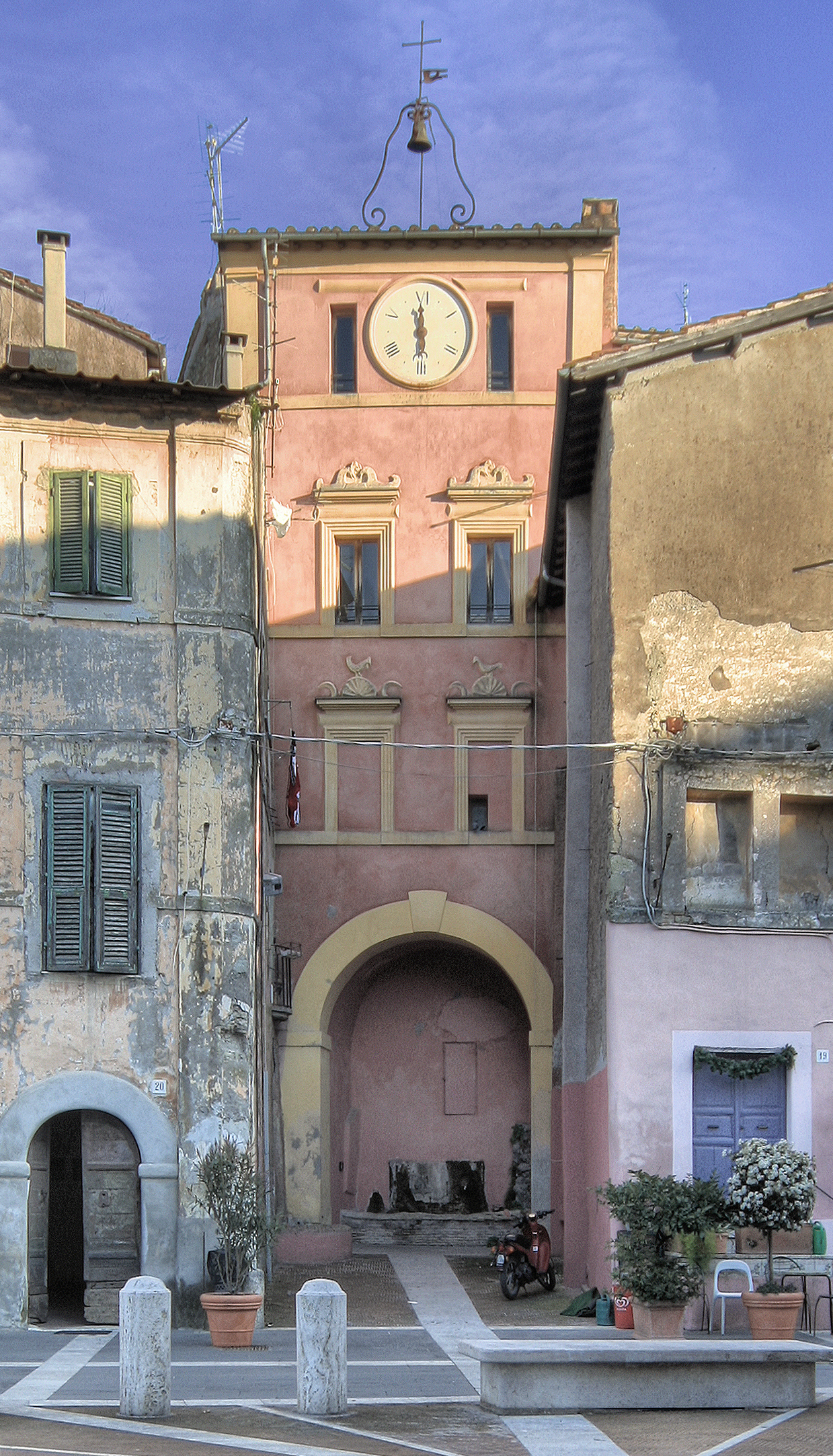
16th-century clock tower

=== Medieval and modern ages ===
The site of present-day Capena has been inhabited intermittently since prehistoric times and archaeological finds dating from the seventh century BC indicate that the inhabitants used a distinctive alphabet (now called the Capena-Leprignano alphabet by philologists) for inscriptions written in the Faliscan language. Continuous habitation began in the 11th century AD, when the Benedictine monastery of Saint Paul – now usually referred to as the Palazzo dei Monaci (Palace of the Monks) – was established on the tuff outcrop known as ‘la Rocca’ (the Rock).

The main frontage of the palazzo faces the Piazza del Popolo, the largest public space in Capena. Originally simply called the ‘Piazza’, the square was laid out in the 16th century, when its extant clock tower was erected on the north side. The surviving monastery complex dates primarily from the Renaissance era, with extensive modifications in 1851.

Despite occasional popular uprisings, the entire village remained under monastic jurisdiction until the fall of the Papal States in 1870, when Leprignano (now Capena) broke away and became an independent municipality.

The palazzo continued to be occupied by monks until the end of the 19th century. The former monastery was subsequently used for municipal purposes and as a school until 1930, and was later subdivided and sold to individuals.

Capena's population has grown rapidly in recent years, as a result of new residential developments on its outskirts. However, the centro storico (the old quarter in the west of the built-up area) has remained little changed in many decades, as can be observed from a comparison between contemporary images and the scenes filmed around the Fontana di Porta Nuova in the 1952 movie Totò a colori. and more widely around Capena in the following year's musical film Saluti e Baci.

== Main sights ==
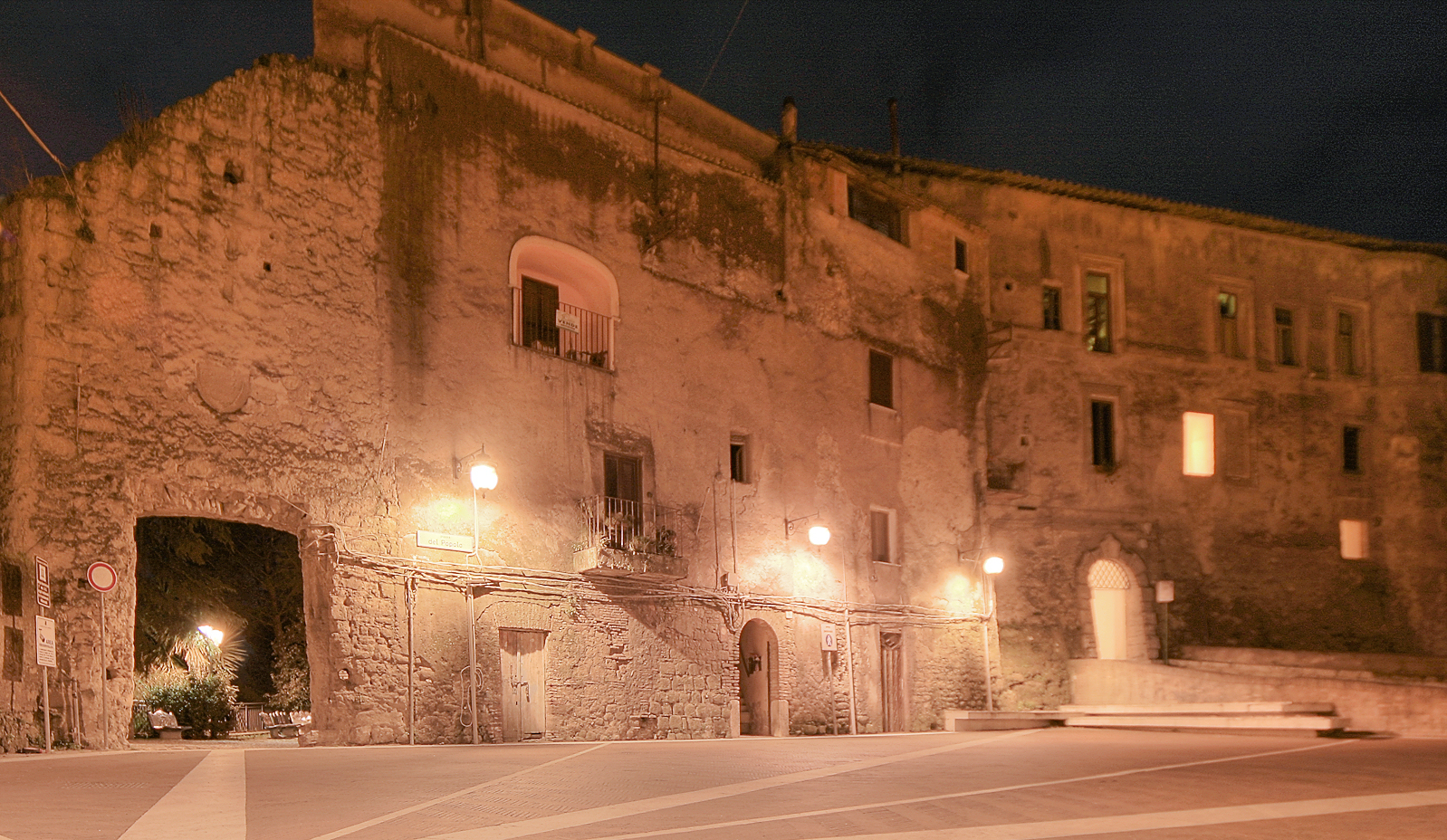
Frontage of the former monastery at night

- former Palazzo dei Monaci (Palace of the Monks)
- medieval Clock Tower, remodelled in the 18th century
- Church of San Leone, which dates from the Lombard era
- Lucus Feroniae archaeological site

== Transport ==
The closest practicable motorway and rail links with Rome lie around 5 and 8 kilometres (3.1 and 5.0 mi) to the east, respectively, on opposites sides of the Tiber. Via Provinciale Capena Bivio (SP17a) connects the E35 Class-A road with Capena.

== Culture ==
=== Art ===
The Lazio region has proclaimed Capena a città d'arte in recognition of its history and its many archaeological finds (most of which are now scattered to museums near and far).

The town is home to a small community of artists, notably Rosina Wachtmeister, who has frequently depicted the old quarter – and particularly its cats – in her work. Wachtmeister's daughter Gabila is also a resident artist and her grandson Battista is a ceramicist who has recently led a project to install mosaic benches and sculptures at various locations around the old quarter.

The Art Forum Würth Capena opened in 2006, on the Via della Buona Fortuna, which runs parallel with the E35 near the eastern end of the Via Provinciale Capena Bivio.

=== Cuisine ===
Capena has a large number of restaurants for a town of its size, both in the centre and on the outskirts. Pizza is the most commonly served dish but a few of the establishments specialise in the cuisines of other parts of Italy, such as Sardinia.

Various local specialities are traditionally prepared for some of the feasts listed in the Events section below, including serpentone, pangiallo, lepericchio and sposatella.

The locally produced bianco Capena (denominazione di origine controllata) is a "slightly bitter wine that is straw yellow with a lightly fruity aroma." It is made with grapes from the Malvasia del Lazio, Trebbiano Toscano, Bellone and Bombino vines.

=== Events ===
All the main recurring events in Capena are ostensibly Roman Catholic religious celebrations. They include the following:

The feast of Saint Anthony the Abbot, on the Sunday after 17 January, which consists of a procession in the saint's honour, the blessing of animals and much smoking by residents of all ages, formerly of dried rosemary in pipes but nowadays of cigarettes, although attempts have been made to discourage this practice. On the eve of this festival local children carry the altar of Saint Anthony from house to house, singing a traditional refrain and collecting donations.

The Procession of the Dead Christ, on Good Friday, with participants wearing traditional black surplices and hoods and carrying the symbols of the Passion on silver plates in a procession.

The feast of Saint Mark the Evangelist, on 25 April, at which the children of Capena traditionally receive their first communion. At the end of the religious ceremony, the participants proceed from the parish church to the little church dedicated to San Marco some distance from the village. The priest blesses the fields in the sacristy of the chapel, and also some special sweets made for the occasion known as lepericchio and sposatella.

The festival of Our Lady of the Assumption (Santa Maria Assunta), which takes place on 13–15 August and is Capena's main annual event. The celebration takes a different form in Capena from that observed in most parts of Italy as it is based on a symbolic re-enactment of the story that Mary lost her Son and searched for him for three days before the pair were emotionally reunited.

The feast of Saint Michael the Archangel, on 29 September, which had its origins in the celebration of farming and agricultural trade, and as a market for livestock.

Harvest festival, on the first Sunday of October, which in Capena primarily celebrates the grape harvest (vendemmia) and is accompanied by parades, floats, sideshows, carnival rides and vinous carousing.

Luke the Evangelist, Capena's patron saint, is honoured on 18 October with the administration of the sacrament of confirmation and a solemn procession with the participation of the Confraternity of the Blessed Sacrament. The feast of Saint Luke has been held here since the early 18th century.

=== Sports ===
Capena has a football team, the Polisportiva Comunale Capena, which who plays in the second categoria level.

== See also ==
- Etruria
- Porta Capena
