= Campagnano di Roma =

- Comune
- Comune di Campagnano di Roma
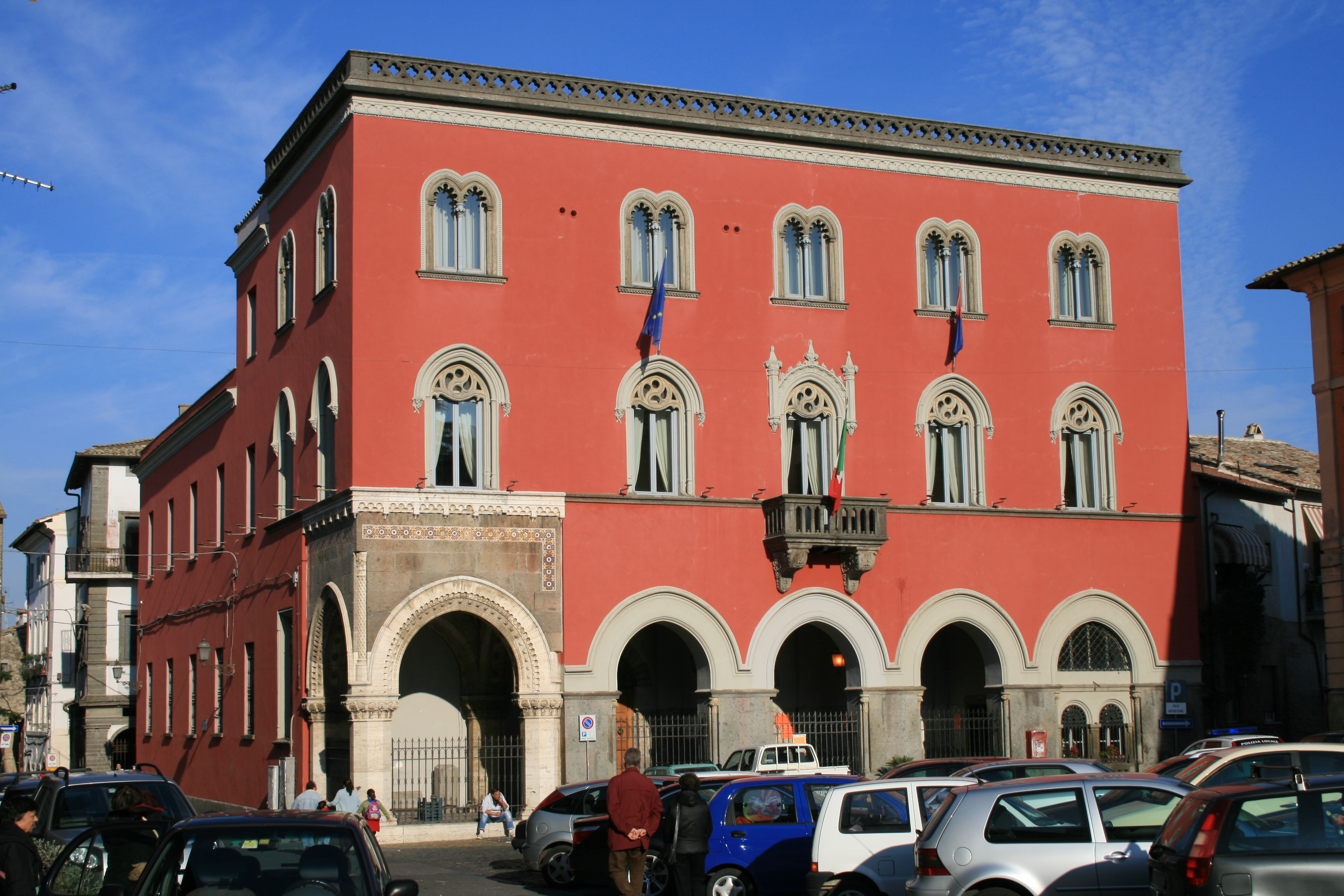
- Town Hall.

- Coat of arms

- Location within Italy Location within Lazio
- Coordinates: 42°8′N 12°23′E
- Country: Italy
- Region: Lazio
- Metropolitan city: Rome (RM)

Government
  - Mayor: Fulvio Fiorelli

Area
  - Total: 46.94 km^{2} (18.12 sq mi)
- Elevation: 270 m (890 ft)

Population (30 April 2017)
  - Total: 11,586
  - Density: 246.8/km^{2} (639.3/sq mi)
- Demonym: Campagnanesi
- Time zone: UTC+1 (CET)
  - Summer (DST): UTC+2 (CEST)
- Postal code: 00063
- Dialing code: 06
- Patron saint: Sts. John the Baptist and Celestine
- Saint day: August 29
- Website: Official website

Campagnano di Roma is a comune (municipality) in the Metropolitan City of Rome in the Italian region of Latium, located about 30 kilometres (19 miles) northwest of Rome. It was first mentioned in 1076, having been carved out of the great estate assembled on the Roman pattern by Pope Adrian I, ca. 780, his Domusculta Capracorum. In medieval times, Campagnano di Roma was on the via Francigena. Here, Sigeric, Archbishop of Canterbury, sojourned on his return journey from Rome about 990.

Campagnano di Roma borders the following municipalities: Anguillara Sabazia, Formello, Magliano Romano, Mazzano Romano, Nepi, Rome, Sacrofano, Trevignano Romano.

The Archaeological Park of Veii is nearby.

The town hosts the ACI Vallelunga Circuit racing circuit.
