= Sacrofano =

- Comune
- Comune di Sacrofano
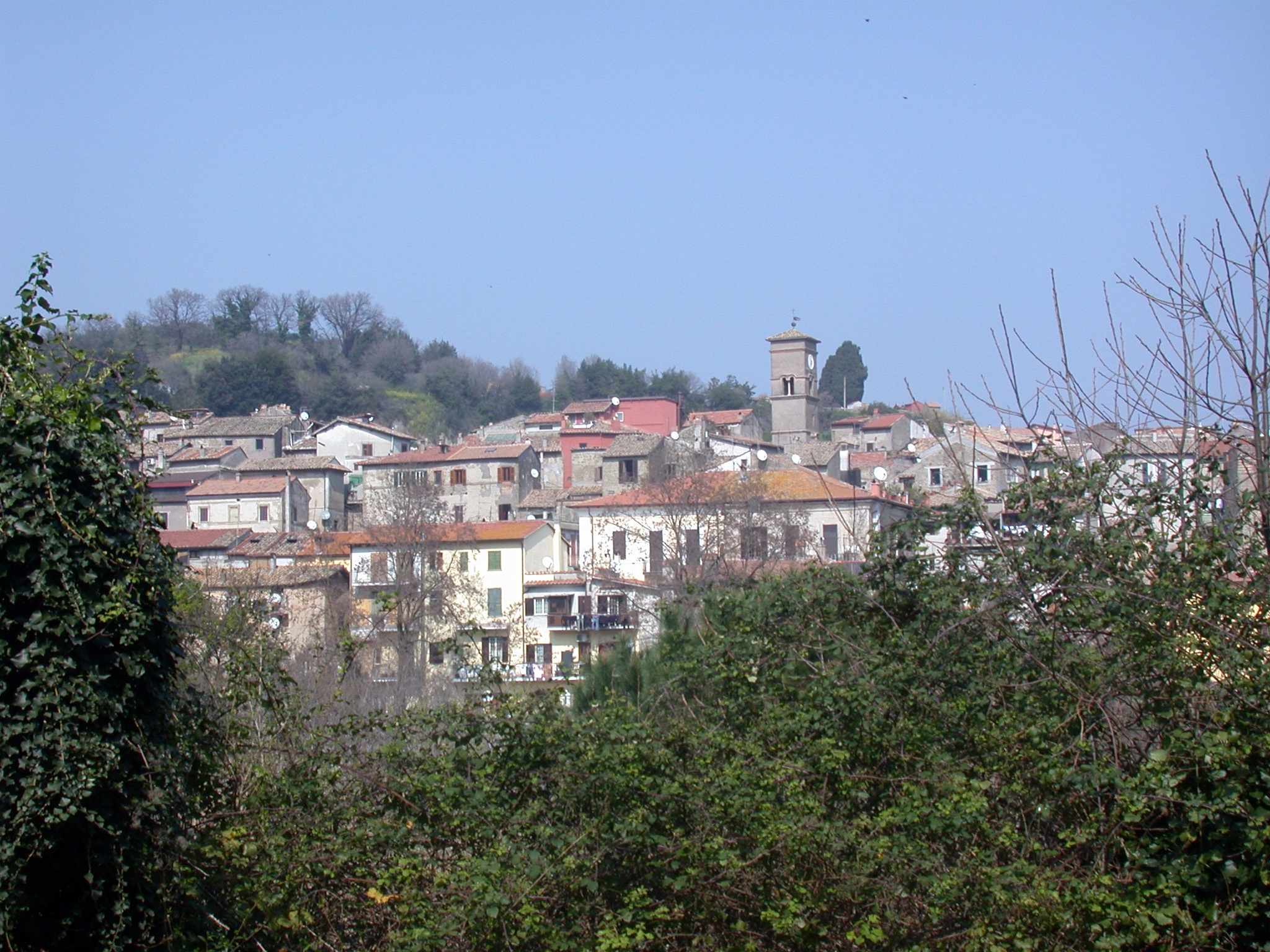
- View of Sacrofano

- Location within Italy Location within Lazio
- Coordinates: 42°6′N 12°27′E
- Country: Italy
- Region: Lazio
- Metropolitan city: Rome (RM)

Government
  - Mayor: Patrizia Nicolini

Area
  - Total: 28.43 km^{2} (10.98 sq mi)
- Elevation: 260 m (850 ft)

Population (31 October 2015)
  - Total: 7,725
  - Density: 271.7/km^{2} (703.8/sq mi)
- Demonym: Sacrofanesi
- Time zone: UTC+1 (CET)
  - Summer (DST): UTC+2 (CEST)
- Postal code: 00060
- Dialing code: 06
- Patron saint: St. Blaise and Geminianus
- Saint day: February 3
- Website: Official website

Sacrofano is a comune (municipality) in the Metropolitan City of Rome in the Italian region of Latium, located about 25 kilometres (16 mi) north of Rome. Located near the Monti Sabatini, at the feet of an extinct volcano, it is included in the Regional Park of Veii.

Sacrofano borders the following municipalities: Campagnano di Roma, Castelnuovo di Porto, Formello, Magliano Romano, Riano, Rome.

== History ==
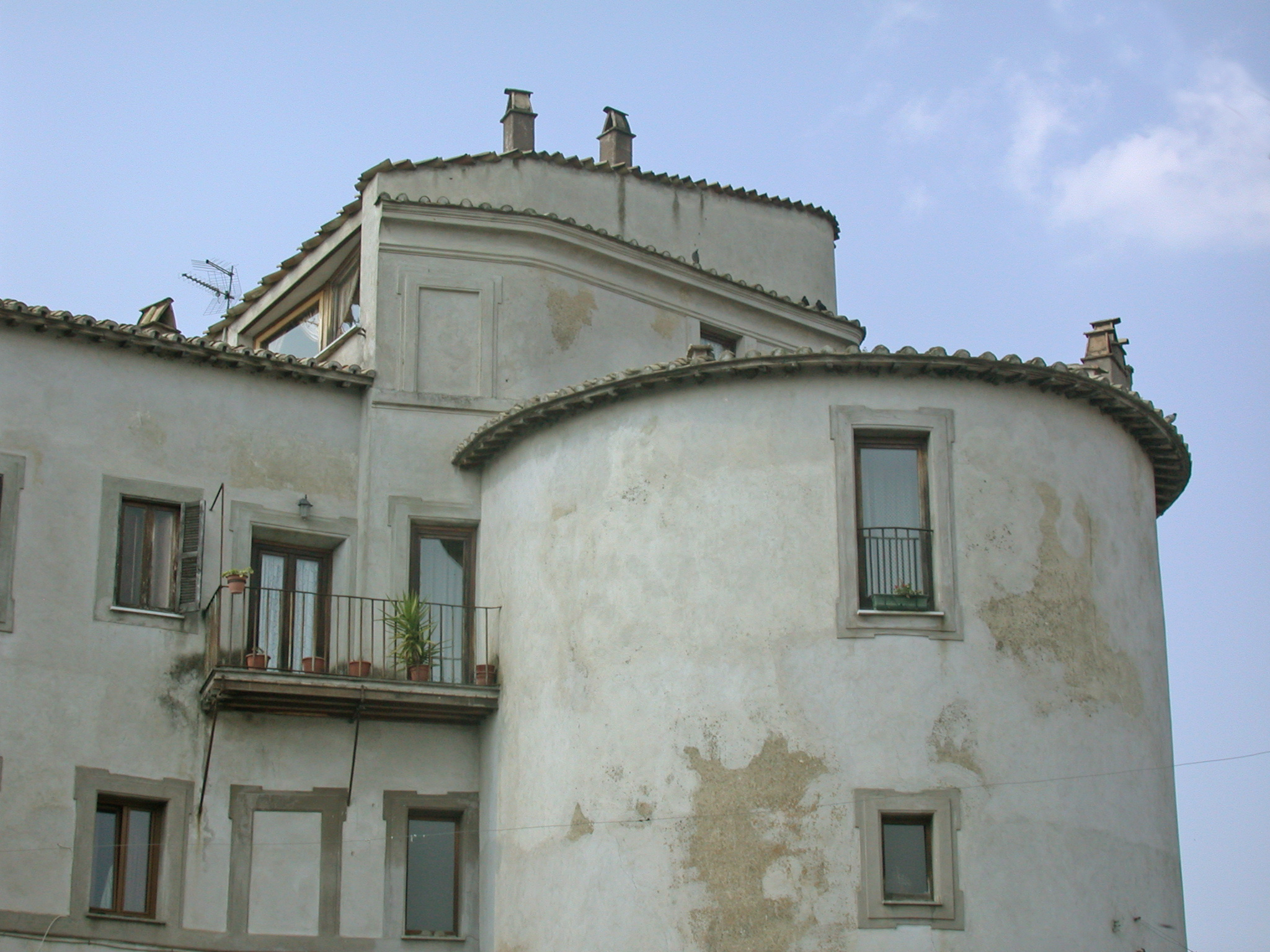
An ancient tower in Sacrofano

They were originally part of the territory of the Etruscan city of Veii. Later it was home to numerous Roman villas, which were abandoned in the 5th-6th centuries. A fundus Scrofanum is mentioned for the first time in 780. A castle was built here probably in the 10th-11th century; in the 13th century it was a possession of the Prefetti di Vico, and later of the Savelli and the Orsini, who acquired it under the reign of Pope Gregory XI (1370–1377). Apart a short conquest by Cesare Borgia (1503–1516), they kept Sacrofano for nearly three centuries: in 1560 it was included in the Duchy of Bracciano. In 1662 the Orsini ceded it to the Chigi family.

== Main sights ==
- The Rocca (castle)
- The church of San Giovanni Battista, dating from the 12th century but restored in the 15th century. It has a tuff bell tower from the 14th century. The church has an irregular plan, with a single nave. The 1515 altar, in polychrome marbles, houses the relic of St. Justin Martyr.

== Transportation ==
Sacrofano has a station on the Roma-Civitacastellana-Viterbo regional railway. It can be reached by car from Rome in c. 20 minutes through the Via Flaminia and the Via Sacrofanese.
