= Names of European cities in different languages (M) =

Different names for European cities in neighbouring languages

The names used for some major European cities differ in different European and sometimes non-European languages. In some countries where there are two or more languages spoken, such as Belgium or Switzerland, dual forms may be used within the city itself, for example on signage. This is also the case in Ireland, despite a low level of actual usage of the Irish language. In other cases where a regional language is officially recognised, that form of the name may be used in the region, but not nationally. Examples include the Welsh language in Wales in the United Kingdom, and regional languages in parts of Italy and Spain.

There is a slow trend to return to the local name, which has been going on for a long time. In English Livorno is now used, the old English form of Leghorn having become antiquated at least a century ago. In some cases, such as the replacement of Danzig with Gdańsk, the official name has been changed more recently. Since 1995, the government of Ukraine has encouraged the use of Kyiv rather than Kiev.

English name	Other names or former names
(Belgium) Maaseik	Maaseik (Dutch*, French*), Masecense (Latin), Maseikas (Lithuanian), Maseyk (alternative French*), Mezeik (Limburgish*)
(Netherlands) Maassluis	Maassluis (Dutch*), Maasslûs (Western Frisian*), Maassloes (Low Saxon*), Maessluus (Zeelandic*), Masleisas (Lithuanian)
(Netherlands) Maastricht	Li Traik (alternative Walloon), Maast'rikht'i – მაასტრიხტი (Georgian*), Maast'rixt' – Մաասթրիխթ (Western Armenian*), Maasthreekhth – ماستریخت (Pashto*), Maastrich – मास्ट्रिच (Hindi), Maastricht (Dutch*), Maastricht – Μάαστριχτ (Greek*), Maastriht – Маастрихт (Bulgarian*, Russian*, Ukrainian*), Maastrikht – Маастрихт (Bashkir*, Mongolian*, Ossetic*), Maastrikht – मास्ट्रिख्ट (Marathi*, Nepali), Maastrixt (Azerbaijani*), Maastrycht – Маастрыхт (Belarusian*), Maestricht (Zeelandic*), Maseuteuriheuteu – 마스트리흐트 (Korean*), Mastrakht – ماستریخت (Persian*), Mastrichtas (Lithuanian*), Mastricum (alternative Latin), Mastriht – Мастрихт (Macedonian, Serbian*), Mastrique (Portuguese*, Spanish*), Mastrixt – Մաստրիխտ (Armenian*), Mastriĥto (Esperanto*), ma tomo Mase (Toki Pona), Maëstricht (French*), Mât thrítth – มาสทริชท์ (Thai*), Mestreech (Limburgish*), Màstrit (Venetian*), Máhsīdahkléihhāakdahk – 馬斯特里赫特 (Cantonese*), Mâstrèct (Arpitan*), Måstrek (Walloon*), Māstrihta (Latvian*), Māstryẖt – ماستريخت (Arabic*, Egyptian Arabic*), Māsutorihito – マーストリヒト (Japanese*), Māsṭrichṭ – මාස්ට්‍රිච්ට් (Sinhala), Mǎsītèlǐhètè – 马斯特里赫特 (Chinese*), Mʾsṭrkṭ – מאסטריכט (Hebrew*), Traiectum ad Mosam (alternative Latin), Traiectum Mosae (Latin*)
(Spain) Madrid	Madrid (Afrikaans, Asturian, Azeri, Croatian, Czech, Danish, Dutch, Estonian, Finnish, French, German, Hungarian, Interlingua, Italian, Maltese, Spanish, Portuguese, Romanian, Scottish Gaelic*, Swedish, Tagalog*, Turkish), Mǎdélǐ - 馬德里 (Traditional Chinese), Mǎdélǐ - 马德里 (Simplified Chinese), Madeurideu/Madŭridŭ - 마드리드 (Korean), Madhríti - Μαδρίτη (Greek), Madorīdo - マドリード (Japanese)*, Madri (Brazilian Portuguese), Madrid - Мадрид (Bulgarian, Russian), Madridas (Lithuanian), Madridi – მადრიდი (Georgian*), Madride (Latvian), Madrido (Esperanto), Madril (Basque), Madrit (Old Catalan), Madryd - Мадрыд (Belarusian), Madryt (Polish), Maidrid (Irish), مدريد (Arabic), मद्रीद (Hindi), مادرید (Persian), মাদ্রিদ - Madrid (Bengali),
(Belarus) Mahilyow	Mahiloŭ - Магілёў (Belarusian), Mogilew or Mohylew (Polish), Mogiļeva or Mahiļova (Latvian), Mogilyov - Могилёв (Russian), Molev - מאָלעװ (Yiddish), Movilău (Romanian), Moghilău (Romanian variant), Mogiliavas (Lithuanian), Mohyliov - Могильов (Ukrainian), Mohyliv - Могилів (Ukrainian variant)
(Germany) Mainz	Määnz (local dialect), Mentz (early modern English), Maghentía - Μαγεντία (Greek), Magonza (Italian), Maguncia (Spanish), Maiența (old Romanian), Mainca (Latvian), Maincheu/Mainch'ŭ - 마인츠 (Korean), Maintsu - マインツ (Japanese)*, Mainz (Dutch, Finnish, German, Romanian, Swedish), Majnc (Serbian), Mayence (French), Meenz (former local dialect), Měiyīncí - 美因茨 (Traditional and Simplified Chinese), Mogúncia (Portuguese), Moguncja (Polish), Moguntiacum (Latin), Mohuč (Czech, Slovak)
(Hungary) Makó	Macău (Romanian), Makó (Hungarian), Makov (Slovak), Makov - מאַקאָוו (Yiddish), Makowa (German)
(Sweden) Malå	Maalege, (Southern Sami), Malå (Swedish), Máláge (Ume Sami)
(Slovakia) Malacky	Malacka (Hungarian*), Malackai (Lithuanian*), Malacki (Latvian*), Malacky (Slovak*), Malacky – Малацки (Serbian*), Mаlаtski (Azerbaijani*), Malatzka (German*)
(Spain) Málaga	Malaca (Latin), Málaga (German, English, Basque, French, Galician, Interlingue, Italian, Portuguese), Màlaga (Catalan), Malaga (Kabyle, Ladino, Polish), Malago (Esperanto), Malaca (Latin), مالقة (Arabic), Málaga - מאלגה (Hebrew), Mǎlājiā - 马拉加 (Chinese), Mallaga - 말라가 (Korean)*, Maraga - マラガ (Japanese)*, Mlkʾ - 𐤌𐤋𐤊𐤀 (Punic)
(Poland) Malbork	Malborg (Romanian), Malbork (Polish), Marienburg (German)
(Belgium) Malmedy	Malmedy (French* German*), Malmédy (Cebuano*), Malmundaria (Latin), Malmund (Anglo-Saxson*) Malmünde (former German*) Måmdiy (Walloon*)
(Sweden) Malmö	Ellenbogen (former German), Malme – მალმე (Georgian*), Malme (Latvian), Malmo (Portuguese) Malmø (Danish),Málmey (Icelandic) Malmö (Azeri, Finnish, German, Swedish, Turkish), Malmő (Hungarian), Malmoe - 말뫼 (Korean), Malmogia (Latin), Marume - マルメ (Japanese)*, MǎěrMò - 马尔默 (simplified) 馬爾默 (traditional) (Chinese), Malme - מאלמה (Hebrew), মালমা - Malma (Bengali)
(United Kingdom) (England) Manchester	Manchain (Irish, Scottish Gaelic*), Maencheseuteo/Maench'esŭt'ŏ - 맨체스터 (Korean), Mamucium (Latin), Manceinion (Welsh), Mančestra (Latvian), Manĉestro (Esperanto), Mančesteris (Lithuanian), Mançester (Albanian), Mànchèsītè - 曼彻斯特 (simplified) 曼徹斯特 (traditional) (Chinese), Mánchester (Spanish) Manchéster (Portuguese), Manchest'eri – მანჩესტერი (Georgian*), Manchesutā - マンチェスター (Japanese)*, Manchuin (Manx)*, Mankhestría - Μαγχεστρία (Greek), منچستر (Persian), ম্যানচেস্টার - Mencheshtar (Bengali)
(Italy) Mantua	Mantoue (French), Mantova (Italian, Finnish, Hungarian, Czech, Maltese, Romanian, Slovak), Mantobha (Scottish Gaelic), Mantua (Dutch, German, Latin, Spanish), Màntua (Catalan), Mântua (Portuguese), Mantoba/Mant'oba - 만토바 (Korean)
(Belgium) Marche-en-Famenne	Marca in Falmana (Latin*), Marche-en-Famenne (French*), Marš an Famenas (Lithuanian), Måtche-el-Fåmene (Walloon*)
(Slovenia) Maribor	Marburg an der Drau (German), Marburgo (Portuguese, Italian), Maribor (Azeri, Finnish, Romanian, Croatian, Slovene), Maribori – მარიბორი (Georgian*), Morpurgo (old Italian), Марибор (Russian, Serbian, Macedonian, Ukrainian)
(Finland) (Åland) Mariehamn	Maarianhamina (Finnish), Mariehamn (Swedish), Maríuhöfn (Icelandic)
(Germany) Marktredwitz	Marktredwitz (German), Ředvice (Czech)
(France) Marseille	Marselha* (Occitan), Marselha (Portuguese)*, Marseille (Finnish*, French*, Swedish*, Scottish Gaelic*), Marsiglia (Italian)*, Marseilla (Basque)*, Marsella (Catalan*, Spanish*, Tagalog*), Mạc Xây or Mac-xây (Vietnamese), Marcel - Մարսել (Armenian), Mareuseyu/Marŭseyu - 마르세유 (Korean), Marsey - מרסיי (Hebrew)*, Marseilles (English variant)*, Marsejlo (Esperanto)*, Marsel (Azeri*, Marsel’ - Марсель (Russian)*, Marseļa (Latvian)*, Marselis (Lithuanian)*, Marselj (Serbian), Marseya (Ladino)*, Marsigghia (Sicilian)*, Marsigla (Romansh), Marsilha/Marselha (Breton*), Marsilia (Romanian)*, Marsilja (Maltese), Marsīliyā - مارسيليا (Arabic)*, Marsilya (Turkish*), Marsylia (Polish)*, Maruseiyu - マルセイユ (Japanese)*, Masalía - Μασσαλία (Greek)*, Massilia (Latin)*, مارسی (Persian), MǎSài - 马赛 (simplified) 馬賽 (traditional) (Chinese)
(Slovakia) Martin	Martin (Slovak*), Martina (Latvian*), Martinas (Lithuanian*), Martinopolis (Latin), Masin (Toki Pona), Sanctus Martinus (alternative Latin), Turčiansky Svätý Martin (archaic Slovak), Turócszentmárton (Hungarian*), Turz-Sankt Martin (German*)
(Italy) Mazzano Romano	Mazzano Romano (Italian), Narce (Etruscan)
(Belgium) Mechelen	Malinas (Spanish), Malines (French, Romanian), Mechelen (Dutch, Finnish), Mecheln (German), Mechlin (older English name), Mekeln (Gronings)
(Slovakia) Medzev	Mecenzéf (Hungarian*), Medzev (English, Slovak*), Medzev – Медзев (Serbian*), Medzeva (Latvian*), Metzenseifen (American English, German*)
(Slovakia) Medzilaborce	Medzilaborce (Slovak*), Medzilaborcė (Lithuanian*), Medschylabirzi – Медзилаборце (Russian*) Medzhilabirtsi – Меджилабірці (Ukrainian*), Mezőlaborc (Hungarian*), Midzhilabirtsyi – Міджілабірцї (Rusyn*)
(Germany) Meißen	Maisen - マイセン (Japanese)*, Meisene (Latvian), Meißen (German), Meissen (Dutch, English, French, Romanian), Míšeň (Czech), Misnia (Italian), Miśnia (Polish)
(Austria) Melk	Medlík (Czech), Melk (German), Mölk (former German)
(Belgium) Menen	Mêende (alternative West Flemish*), Mêenn (West Flemish*), Meên'n (Zeelandic*), Menen (Dutch*), Menenas (Lithuanian), Menin (French*, Occitan*), Monena (Latin)
(France) Menton	Mantona (Latvian, Polish), Menton (Catalan, English, French, Lombard, Occitan, Piedmontese, Sardinian, Spanish, Venetian), Mentonas (Lithuanian), Mentone (Italian), Mentonum (Latin), Mentun (Ligure)
(Netherlands) Meppel	Mepel – Մեպել (Armenian*), Mepelis (Lithuanian), Mepeol – 메펄 (Korean*), Meppel (Dutch*), Meppel – Меппел (Russian*), Meppel" – Меппель (Ukrainian*), Mepperu – メッペル (Japanese*), Mopol – مپل (Persian*), Mpl – מפל (Hebrew), Mybl – ميبل (Arabic*, Egyptian Arabic*), Myepyel – Мепел (Belarusian*), Méipòěr – 梅珀爾/梅珀尔 (Chinese*), Möppelt (Drèents, Low Saxon*, Low German*)
(Belgium) Mesen	Mêesn (West Flemish*), Meês'n (Zeelandic*), Mesen (Dutch*), Messene (Walloon*), Messina (Latin), Messines (archaic English*, French*, Occitan*)
(Italy) Messina	Missina (Sicilian), Messina (Azeri, Catalan, Dutch, Finnish, Irish, Italian, Maltese, Portuguese, Romanian, Scottish Gaelic, Turkish), Mesīna (Latvian), Mesina (Spanish), Mesíni - Μεσσίνη (Greek), Messana (Latin), Messēnē - Μεσσήνη (Ancient Greek), Messhīna - メッシーナ (Japanese)*, Messine (French), Messyna / Mesyna (Polish), Micina (Old Spanish), Zánklē - Ζάγκλη (Ancient Greek alternate)
(France) Metz	Divodurum (Latin), Meca (Latvian), Mec - Мец (Bulgarian, Russian, Serbian), Méty (Czech), Metz (Dutch, Finnish, French, German, Italian, Portuguese, Romanian)
(Ukraine) Medzhybizh	Medschybisch (German), Medžibož - Меджибож (Russian), Medžybiž (Finnish), Medžybiž - Меджибіж (Ukrainian), Mezbizh - מעזביזש (Yiddish), Międzybórz (Polish)
(Slovakia) Michalovce	Großmichel (German*), Michalovce (Slovak*), Michalovcė (Lithuanian*), Mihalovce (Latvian*, Serbo-Croatian*), Mihalovce – Михаловце (Serbian*), Mihalya (Romani), Mikhaylovets or Mykhaylovyts – מיכאלאָווצע (Yiddish*), Mixalovtse (Azerbaijani*), Nagymihály (Hungarian*)
(Netherlands) Middelburg	Madl‌bwrkh – میدل‌بورخ (Persian*), Medioburgum (Latin*), Middelbourg (French*), Middelbowrg – Միդդելբուրգ (Armenian), Middelburch (Western Frisian*), Middelburg (Dutch*), Middelburg – Мидделбург (Ossetic*, Russian*), Middelburh – Мідделбург (Ukrainian*), Midelburg – Мідэлбург (Belarusian*), Midelburga (Latvian*), Midelburgas (Lithuanian*), Midelburgo (Spanish*, Portuguese*), Midelbwireuheu – 미델뷔르흐 (Korean*), Midelbyorg – Миделбьорг (Bulgarian*), Mideruburufu – ミデルブルフ (Japanese*), Midyelboorgu – Миделбург (Macedonian, Serbian*), Mintelmpoerch – Μίντελμπουρχ (Greek*), Mydlbwrk – מידלבורך (Hebrew*), Mydylbwrẖ – ميديلبورخ (Arabic*, Egyptian Arabic*), Mítdeērnbèūk – มิดเดิลบืร์ค (Thai*)
(Romania) Miercurea-Ciuc	Miercurea-Ciuc (Romanian), Csíkszereda (Hungarian), Szeklerburg (German)
(Finland) Mikkeli	Mikkeli (Finnish), Sankt Michel (Swedish)
(Italy) Milan	Milano (Croatian, Danish, Esperanto, Finnish, Irish, Italian, Romanian, Scottish Gaelic*, Serbian, Swedish, Tagalog*, Turkish), Mailand (Former Danish, German), Majland (Old Hungarian), Mediolan (Polish), Mediólana - Μεδιόλανα (former Greek), Mediolānum (Latin), Milà (Catalan), Milaan (Afrikaans, Dutch, Frisian), Milan (Azeri, French, Friulian, Maltese, Milanese, Slovene), Milán (Czech, Galician, Spanish), Mǐlán - 米兰 (simplified) 米蘭 (traditional) (Chinese), Milāna (Latvian), Milanas (Lithuanian), Milani – მილანი (Georgian*), Milano - Милано (Bulgarian), Miláno - Μιλάνο (Greek), Milánó (Hungarian), Miláno (Slovak), Mīlānū (Arabic), Milão (Portuguese), Milaun (Romansh), Millano - 밀라노 (Korean), Mirano - ミラノ (Japanese)*, میلان (Persian)
(Belarus) Minsk	Miensk - Менск (classical Belarusian), Minseukeu/Minsŭk'ŭ - 민스크 (Korean), Minsk (Azeri, Dutch, Finnish, French, German, Romanian, Scottish Gaelic*, Turkish), Minsk - Мінск (Belarusian), Minsk - Минск (Bulgarian, Russian, Serbian), Minsk - מינסק (Yiddish), Mińsk (Polish), Mins'k - Мінськ (Ukrainian), Minska (Latvian), Minskas (Lithuanian), Minsk'i – მინსკი (Georgian*), Minsko (Esperanto), Minsque (Portuguese)*, Minsuku - ミンスク (Japanese)*, Minxcơ (Vietnamese), Minszk (Hungarian), مینسک (Persian), MíngSīKè - 明斯克 (simplified) 明斯克 (traditional) (Chinese), Mionsc (Irish, alternate Scottish Gaelic*)
(Italy) Mirandola	La Miràndla or La Miràndula (Emilian*), Mǐlándoulā - 米兰多拉 (semplified) 米蘭多拉 (traditional) (Chinese*), Mirándola (Galician, Portuguese, Spanish) - Μιράντολα (Greek), Miràndola (Catalan), Mirandole (French), Mirandora - ミランドラ (Japanese*), Mirandula (Latin*)
(Hungary) Miskolc	Miskolc (Hungarian, Finnish), Miškolc (Serbian), Miškovec (Czech, Slovak), Miszkolc (Polish), Mișcolț (Romanian)
(Italy) Modena	Modena (Dutch, English, German, Irish, Italian, Scottish Gaelic), Modène (French), Módena (Galician, Portuguese, Spanish), Mòdena (Catalan), Mutina (Latin), MōDiǎnNà - 摩德納 (simplified) 摩典納 (traditional) (Chinese)
(Slovakia) Modra	Modern (German*), Modor (Hungarian*), Modra (Slovak*), Modur (Latin)
(Slovakia) Modrý Kameň	Blauenstein (German*), Modri Kameņa (Latvian*), Modri Kamenj (Serbo-Croatian*), Modri Kamenj – Модри Камењ (Serbian*), Modrý Kameň (Slovak*), Kékkő (Hungarian*)
(Romania) Moinești	Moinești (Romanian), Mojnest (Hungarian)
(Slovakia) Moldava nad Bodvou	Moldau (an der Bodwa) (German*), Moldava na Bodvi (Serbo-Croatian*), Moldava nad Bodvou (Slovak*), Moldava nad Bodvu – Молдава над Бодву (Serbian*), Moldava pie Bodvas (Latvian*), Szepsi (Hungarian*)
Monaco	Munegu (Monegasque), Monaco (Danish, Dutch, Estonian, Finnish, French, German, Hungarian, Interlingua, Italian, Romanian, Scottish Gaelic*, Swedish, Welsh), Monacó (Irish), Monacô (Arpitan), Mónaco (Portuguese, Spanish), Mônaco (Brazilian Portuguese), Mónàgē - 摩納哥 (Traditional Chinese), Mónàgē - 摩纳哥 (Simplified Chinese), Monakas (Lithuanian), Monako (Azeri, Basque, Bosnian, Breton, Croatian, Esperanto, Frisian, Latvian, Maltese, Polish, Serbian, Slovak, Slovene, Turkish), Monak'o – მონაკო (Georgian*), Monakó - (Hungarian) Monakó - Μονακό (Greek), Mónakó (Icelandic), Monegue (Occitan), Monoecus (Latin), Manaka - Манака (Belarusian), Monako - モナコ (Japanese)*, Monako - Монако (Bulgarian), Monako/Monak'o - 모나코 (Korean), Mònec (Old Catalan), Mònaco (Catalan)
(Italy) Monfalcone	Tržič (Slovene), Falkenberg (German)
(Netherlands) Monnickendam	Manikendamas (Lithuanian), Monnickendam (Dutch), Monnikendam – Моннікендам (Ukrainian), Monnikkendam – Монниккендам (Russian), Mwnqndʾ– מוניקנדאם (Hebrew)
(Belgium) Mons	Berg (Limburgish), Bergen (Afrikaans*, Dutch, German, Northern Frisian*, Western Frisian*, Zeelandic*), Bergena (alternative Latvian*), Bergenas (alternative Lithuanian*), Bergn (West Flemish*), Berĥeno (Esperanto), Mon (Picard*), Mons (alternative Afrikaans*, French, Romanian), Monsa (Latvian*), Monsas (Lithuanian*), Mont (alternative Picard*, Walloon), Montes (Latin*)
(Germany) Monschau	Monschau (German), Montjoie (French)
(France) Montbéliard	Mömpelgard (former German), Montbéliard (French, Romanian)
(Netherlands) Montfoort	Montfoort (Dutch), Montfoort – Монтфоорт (Bulgarian), Montfort – Մոնտֆորտ (Armenian), Montfort – Монтфорт (Russian, Ukrainian), Montfortas (Lithuanian), Montoforuto – モントフォールト (Japanese), Mwntfwrt – مونتفورت (Arabic, Egyptian Arabic), Mόntfoort – Μόντφοορτ (Greek)
(Netherlands) Montfort	Mofert (Limburgish), Montfort (Dutch), Montfort – Монтфорт (Russian, Ukrainian), Montofoto – モントフォート (Japanese), Moquvdi – ᎼᏋᏗ (Cherokee), Mόntfort – Μόντφορτ (Greek)
(Italy) Monza	Montsch (former German), Montsa - モンツァ (Japanese)*, Monza (Italian, Maltese)
(Poland) Morąg	Mohrungen (German), Morąg (German, Polish)
(Belgium) Mortsel	Mortensella (Latin*), Mortsel (Dutch*), Mortselis (Lithuanian)
(Russia) Moscow	Moskva (Azeri, Bosnian, Croatian, Czech, Danish, Estonian, Hebrew, Icelandic, Norwegian, Slovak, Slovene, Swedish), Moskva - Москва (Bulgarian, Russian, Serbian, Ukrainian), Maskava (Latvian), Maskva (Lithuanian), Maskva - Масква (Belarusian), Mosca (Italian), Moscau (Romansh), Moscó (Irish), Moscou (Arpitan, Catalan, French, Brazilian Portuguese), Moscova (Galician, Romanian), Moscovo (European Portuguese), Moscú (Spanish), Mosgo/Moscobha (Scottish Gaelic) *, Moska (Maltese), Mosekao (Hawaiian), Mòsīkē - 莫斯科 (Traditional and Simplified Chinese), Moskau (German), Móskha - Μόσχα (Greek), Moskou (Afrikaans, Dutch, Frisian), Moskova (Finnish, Turkish), Moskva - Մոսկվա (Armenian), Moskve - מאָסקװע (Standard written Yiddish), Moskiv - מאָסקעװ (spoken Southeastern Yiddish), Moskeve - מאָסקעװע (spoken Central Yiddish), Mosku (Tagalog*) Moskvo (Esperanto), Moskwa (Indonesian, Polish), Mosukuwa - モスクワ (Japanese)*, Moszkva (Hungarian), موسكو Mūskū (Arabic), Matxcơva or Mạc Tư Khoa (Vietnamese, the latter is old-fashioned), Moseukeuba/Mosŭk'ŭba - 모스크바 (Korean), مسکو (Persian), Moskë (Albanian)
(Hungary) Mosonmagyaróvár	Mosonmagyaróvár (Hungarian), Wieselburg-Ungarisch Altenburg (German), Uhorský Starhrad (Slovak)
(Croatia) Motovun	Montona (Italian), Motovun (Bosnian, Croatian, Serbian)
(Belgium) Mouscron	Moeschroen (alternative West Flemish*), Moeskroen (Dutch*, Western Frisian, West Flemish*, Limburgish*, Zeelandic*), Moscrum (alternative Latin*), Moucron (Picard*, Walloon*) Mouscron (French*), Muskrona (Latvian*), Mukronas (Lithuanian*), Musera (Latin*), Muskrono (Esperanto*)
(Belarus) Mstsislaw	Amścisłaŭ - Амсьціслаў (Taraškievica Belarusian*), Mscisłaŭ – Мсціслаў (Belarusian*), Mścisłaŭ - Мсьціслаў (alternative Belarusian), Mscislav - Мсцислав (Serbian*), Mscislava (Latvian*), Mscislavas (Lithuanian*), Mścisław (Polish)*,^{[KNAB]} Mstislav - Мстислав (alternative Serbian), Mstislavǎl – Мстиславъл (Bulgarian*), Mstislavl′ – Мстиславль (Russian*),^{[KNAB]} Mstislavlis (archaic Lithuanian), Mstsislau (Finnish*), Mstyslavl′ – Мстиславль (Ukrainian*), Mszislau (German*), Mǔsīqísīlāfū – 姆斯齊斯拉夫 (Mandarin Chinese*), Musutsisurau – ムスツィスラウ (Japanese*)
(Netherlands) Muiden	Maowden – Մաուդեն (Armenian), Mauden – マウデン (Japanese), Mejden – Мејден (Macedonian), Mejden – Мейден (Ukrainian), Mjojden – Мёйден (Russian), Mojden – Мойден (Bulgarian), Muden (Low Saxon), Muiden (Dutch), Muidenas (Lithuanian), Mạwdn – ماودن (Arabic, Egyptian Arabic)
(Ukraine) Mukachevo	Moukatchevo (French), Mucacevo (Romanian), Mukačevo (Czech, Slovak), Mukačava - Мукачава (Belarusian), Mukaçevo (Crimean Tatar), Mukacheve - Мукачеве (Ukrainian variant), Mukachevo - Мукачево (Ukrainian, Bulgarian, Serbian, Russian), Mukachiv - Мyкaчiв (Ruthenian), Mukaczewo (Polish), Minkatsh - מינקאַטש (Yiddish), Muncaci (Romanian variant), Munkács (Hungarian), Munkatsch (German)
(France) Mulhouse	Milhüse or Milhüsa (Alsatian), Mülhausen (German), Mulhouse (Finnish, French, Romanian), Mylhúzy (Czech), Miluza (Polish), Milouzi - Μυλούζη (Greek)
(Germany) Munich	Minca (Romansh), Minga (Bavarian), Minhen (Bosnian, Serbian), Minhene (Latvian), Minkhn - מינכן (Yiddish, Hebrew); Miunchenas (Lithuanian), Miunkheni – მიუნხენი (Georgian*), Miyūnikh (Arabic), Myunkhen - Мюнхен (Belarusian, Bulgarian, Russian, Ukrainian), Mnichov (Czech), Mníchov (Slovak), Monachium (Polish), Mnichów (old Polish), Monaco di Baviera (Italian), Mónakho - Μόναχο (Greek), Monakovo (old Slovene), München (Afrikaans, Croatian, Danish, Dutch, Estonian, Finnish, Frisian, German, Hungarian, Norwegian, Romanian, Low Saxon, modern Slovene, Swedish, Scottish Gaelic *), Munĥeno or Munkeno (Esperanto), Múnic (Galician), Munic (Catalan), Múnich (Spanish), Münih (Turkish), Mùníhēi - 慕尼黑 (Traditional and Simplified Chinese), Munique (Portuguese), Mûnik (Walloon), Munikh (Armenian), Muunsjen (Gronings), Myunhen - ミュンヘン (Japanese)*, Mwinhen - 뮌헨 (Korean), مونیخ (Persian), Mynih (Albanian)
(France) Munster	Munster (French *, German*), Münster im Elsaß (German*)
(Germany) Münster	Minstere (Latvian), Monastério (Portuguese)*, Münster (German, Romanian, Turkish), Meuster (Walloon), Monastyr (Polish),뮌스터 (Korean)
(Spain) Murcia	Murcia (Spanish, English, German), Múrcia (Portuguese, Catalan), Murcie (French), Mursiya (Arabic), Mursyah (Hebrew)
(Russia) Murmansk	Moermansk (Afrikaans, Dutch, Frisian), Mureumanseukeu/Murŭmansŭk'ŭ - 무르만스크 (Korean), Mourmansk (French), Murmanska (Latvian), Murmansk - Мурманск (Belarusian, Bulgarian, Russian, Serbian), Murmansk (Finnish, Italian, Romanian), Múrmansk (Icelandic), Murmańsk (Polish), Murmanskas (Lithuanian), Murmansko (Esperanto), Murumansuku - ムルマンスク (Japanese)*, Muurmanni or Muurmanski (former Finnish), Muurmansk or Murmansk (Finnish), Muurman or Murmánska (Sami), Romanov-on-Murman (former name)
(Slovakia) Myjava	Miava (Hungarian*, archaic Slovak), Miawa (German*), Mijava – Мијава (Serbian*), Myjava (Slovak*)
(Ukraine) Mykolaiv	Mikałajeŭ - Мікалаеў (Belarusian), Mik'olaivi - მიკოლაივი (Georgian*), Mikołajów (Polish), Mikolajiv (Hungarian), Mıkolayiv (Crimean Tatar, Turkish), Mîkolaiv or Nicolaev (Romanian), Mykolaiv - Миколаїв (Ukrainian, Rusyn), Mykolaïv (French, Italian), Mykolajiv (Czech, Finnish, Slovak, Swedish), Mykolajiw (German), Nikolayev - Николаев (Bulgarian, Russian), Balaban (Crimean Tatar historic name)
