= Morlupo =

- Comune
- Comune di Morlupo
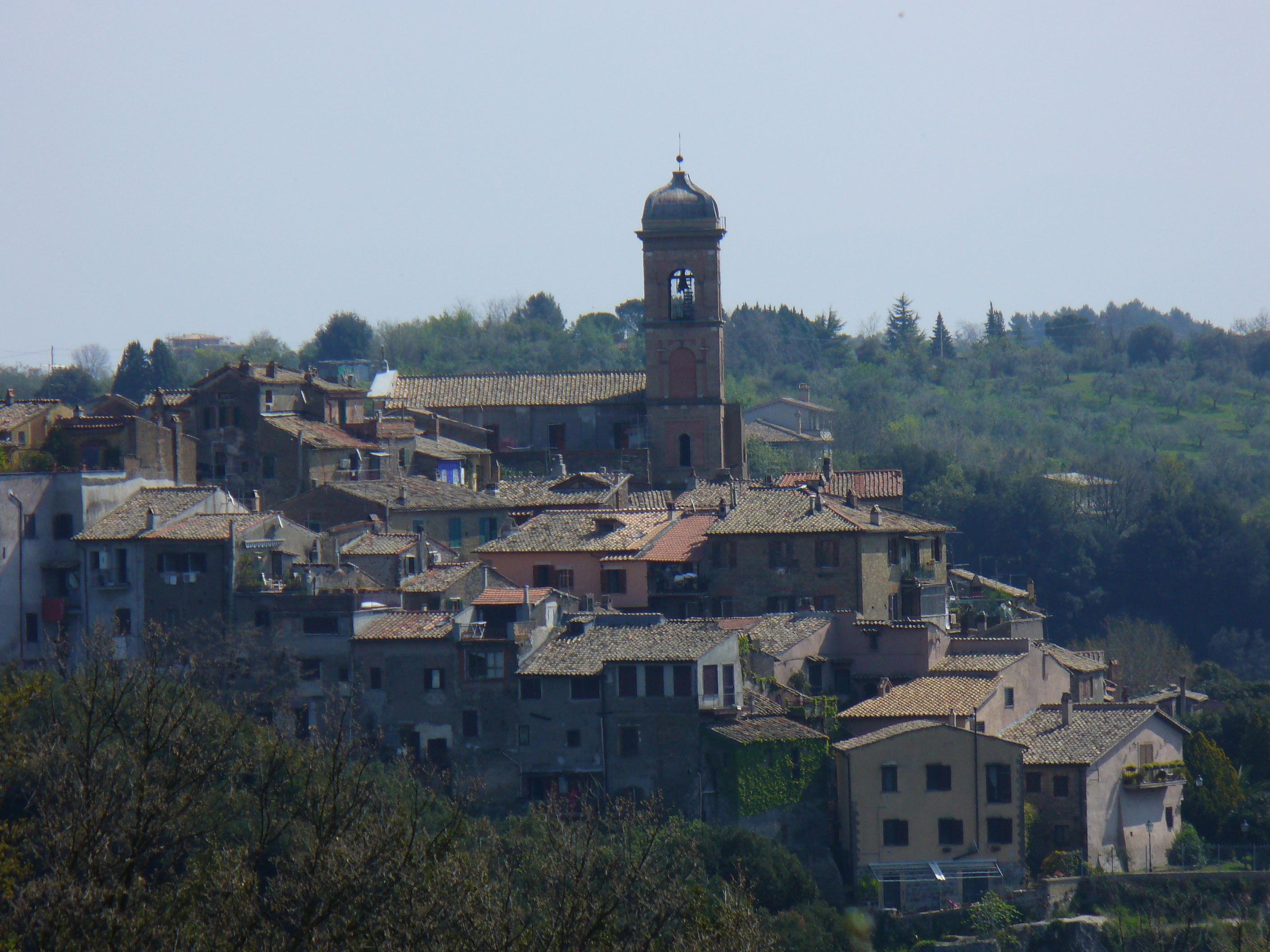
- Morlupo view from West (April 2007)

- Coat of arms

- Location within Italy Location within Lazio
- Coordinates: 42°9′N 12°30′E
- Country: Italy
- Region: Lazio
- Metropolitan city: Rome (RM)

Government
  - Mayor: Ettore Iacomussi

Area
  - Total: 24.08 km^{2} (9.30 sq mi)
- Elevation: 207 m (679 ft)

Population (30 November 2017)
  - Total: 8,679
  - Density: 360.4/km^{2} (933.5/sq mi)
- Demonym: Morlupesi
- Time zone: UTC+1 (CET)
  - Summer (DST): UTC+2 (CEST)
- Postal code: 00067
- Dialing code: 06
- Patron saint: St. Mary the Assumpted
- Saint day: August 15
- Website: Official website

Morlupo (Romanesco: Morlopu) is a comune (municipality) in the Metropolitan City of Rome Capital, in the Italian region of Latium, located about 30 kilometres (19 mi) north of Rome.

Morlupo borders the following municipalities: Capena, Castelnuovo di Porto, Magliano Romano, Rignano Flaminio.
