= Rignano Flaminio =

- Comune
- Comune di Rignano Flaminio
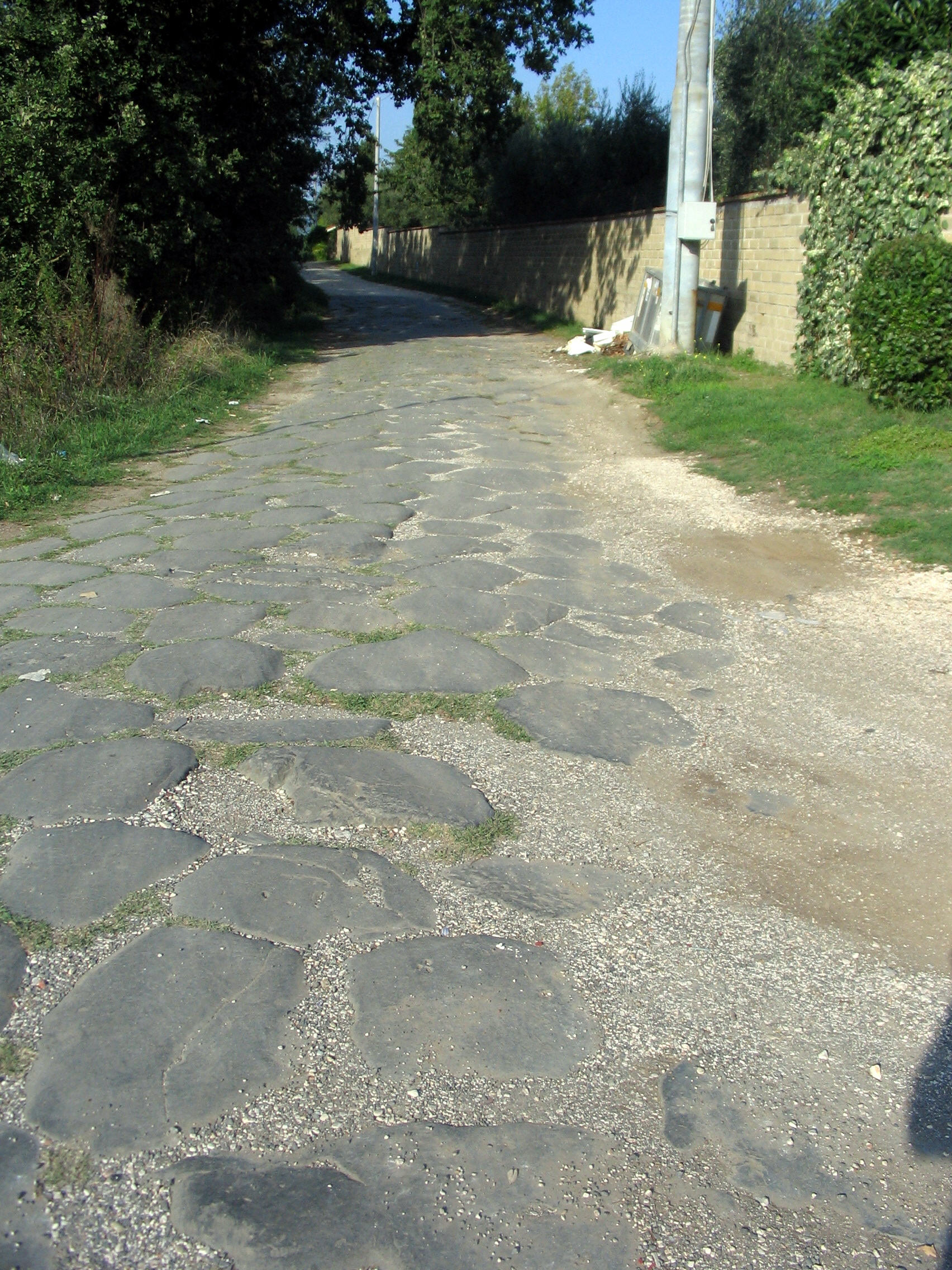
- The ancient Via Flaminia

- Location within Italy Location within Lazio
- Coordinates: 42°12′N 12°29′E
- Country: Italy
- Region: Lazio
- Metropolitan city: Rome (RM)
- Frazioni: Capannacce, Case Morolo, Montelarco, Santo Sisini, Valle Spadana

Government
  - Mayor: Fabio Di Lorenzi

Area
  - Total: 38.56 km^{2} (14.89 sq mi)
- Elevation: 250 m (820 ft)

Population (30 November 2016)
  - Total: 10,237
  - Density: 265.5/km^{2} (687.6/sq mi)
- Demonym: Rignanesi
- Time zone: UTC+1 (CET)
  - Summer (DST): UTC+2 (CEST)
- Postal code: 00068
- Dialing code: 0761
- Website: Official website

Rignano Flaminio is a comune (municipality) in the Metropolitan City of Rome in the Italian region of Latium, about 35 kilometres (22 mi) north of Rome. It is across the Via Flaminia.

Rignano Flaminio borders the municipalities of Calcata, Capena, Civitella San Paolo, Faleria, Magliano Romano, Morlupo, and Sant'Oreste.

It has a station on the Roma-Viterbo railway.

== History ==
Agricultural settlements of the Capenati and Falisci in the area are attested from the 5th or 4th centuries BC. In the 6th century AD a popular pilgrimage church, entitled to St. Abondius and Abondantius, was created here; the saints' relics were moved to Rome, on the Tiber Island, in 999. In 1159 Pope Adrian IV died at Rignano.

Rignano was first a possession of Santa Maria in Trastevere and then of the Savelli family, who were shortly ousted by Pope Alexander VI. After the fall of the Borgia, the Savelli regained it and held the fief until 1607, when they sold it to the Borghese. It later passed to the Muti, the Cesi and the Massimo families.
