= Civitella San Paolo =

- Comune
- Comune di Civitella San Paolo
- Location within Italy Location within Lazio
- Coordinates: 42°12′N 12°35′E
- Country: Italy
- Region: Lazio
- Metropolitan city: Rome (RM)

Government
  - Mayor: Basilio Rocco Stefani

Area
  - Total: 20.53 km^{2} (7.93 sq mi)
- Elevation: 195 m (640 ft)

Population (30 June 2017)
  - Total: 2,048
  - Density: 99.76/km^{2} (258.4/sq mi)
- Time zone: UTC+1 (CET)
  - Summer (DST): UTC+2 (CEST)
- Postal code: 00060
- Dialing code: 0765
- Patron saint: St. James
- Saint day: 20 March
- Website: Official website

Civitella San Paolo is a comune (municipality) in the Metropolitan City of Rome in the Italian region of Lazio, located about 35 kilometres (22 mi) north of Rome.

== Physical geography ==
The municipal territory of Civitella San Paolo borders the municipalities of Capena to the south, Fiano Romano to the east, Sant'Oreste and Rignano Flaminio to the west, and Ponzano Romano and Nazzano to the north. It is about forty-five kilometers from Rome, ten from Capena, and seven from Fiano Romano.

The territory, mainly hilly, reaches its maximum altitude with the 288 m of the hill of Monte Cucolo.
