= Magliano Romano =

- Comune
- Comune di Magliano Romano
- Location within Italy Location within Lazio
- Coordinates: 42°9′N 12°26′E
- Country: Italy
- Region: Lazio
- Metropolitan city: Rome (RM)

Government
  - Mayor: Francesco Mancini

Area
  - Total: 20.52 km^{2} (7.92 sq mi)
- Elevation: 270 m (890 ft)

Population (30 September 2017)
  - Total: 1,372
  - Density: 66.86/km^{2} (173.2/sq mi)
- Demonym: Maglianesi
- Time zone: UTC+1 (CET)
  - Summer (DST): UTC+2 (CEST)
- Postal code: 00060
- Dialing code: 06
- Patron saint: St. John the Baptist
- Saint day: June 26
- Website: Official website

Magliano Romano is a comune (municipality) in the Metropolitan City of Rome in the Italian region of Latium, located about 30 kilometres (19 mi) north of Rome.

Magliano Romano borders the following municipalities: Calcata, Campagnano di Roma, Castelnuovo di Porto, Mazzano Romano, Morlupo, Rignano Flaminio, Sacrofano.
