= Mazzano Romano =

- Comune
- Comune di Mazzano Romano
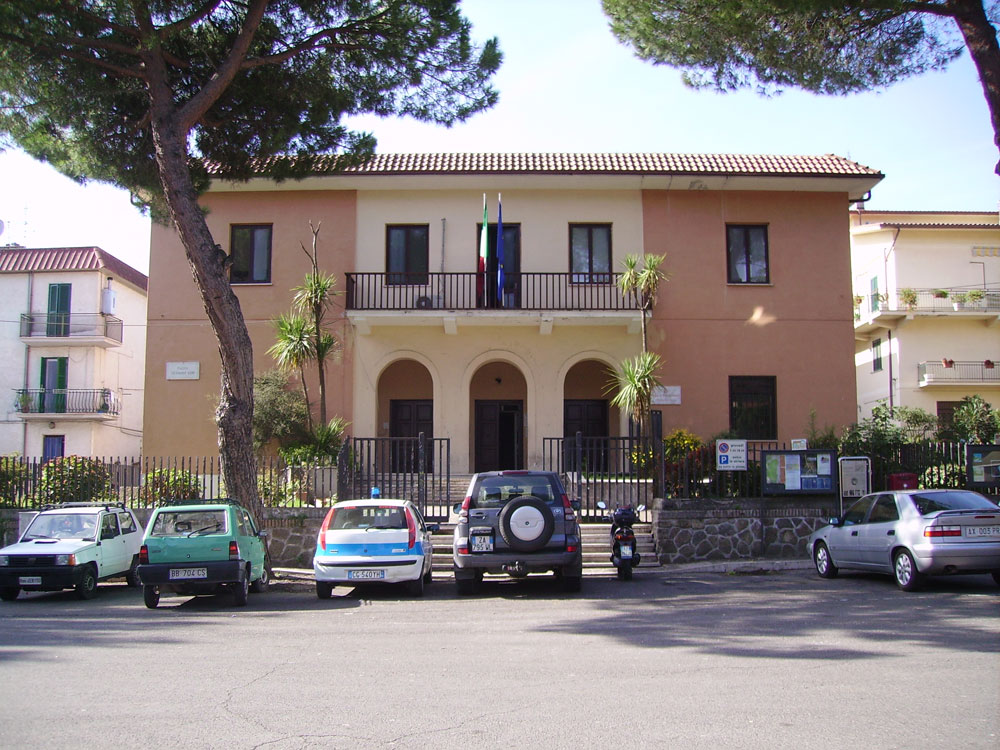
- Town Hall.

- Coat of arms

- Location within Italy Location within Lazio
- Coordinates: 42°12′N 12°24′E
- Country: Italy
- Region: Lazio
- Metropolitan city: Rome (RM)

Government
  - Mayor: Nicoletta Irato

Area
  - Total: 29.07 km^{2} (11.22 sq mi)
- Elevation: 200 m (660 ft)

Population (31 October 2017)
  - Total: 3,120
  - Density: 107/km^{2} (278/sq mi)
- Demonym: Mazzanesi
- Time zone: UTC+1 (CET)
  - Summer (DST): UTC+2 (CEST)
- Postal code: 00060
- Dialing code: 06
- Patron saint: St. Nicholas
- Saint day: September 7
- Website: Official website

Mazzano Romano is a comune (municipality) in the Metropolitan City of Rome in the Italian region of Latium, located about 35 kilometres (22 mi) north of Rome.

Mazzano Romano borders the following municipalities: Calcata, Campagnano di Roma, Castel Sant'Elia, Faleria, Magliano Romano, Nepi.

First mentioned in 945, it is one of the villages that formed from the great estate assembled by Pope Adrian I about 780, his Domusculta Capracorum. It includes the Regional Park of Veii.
