= Calcata =

- Comune
- Comune di Calcata
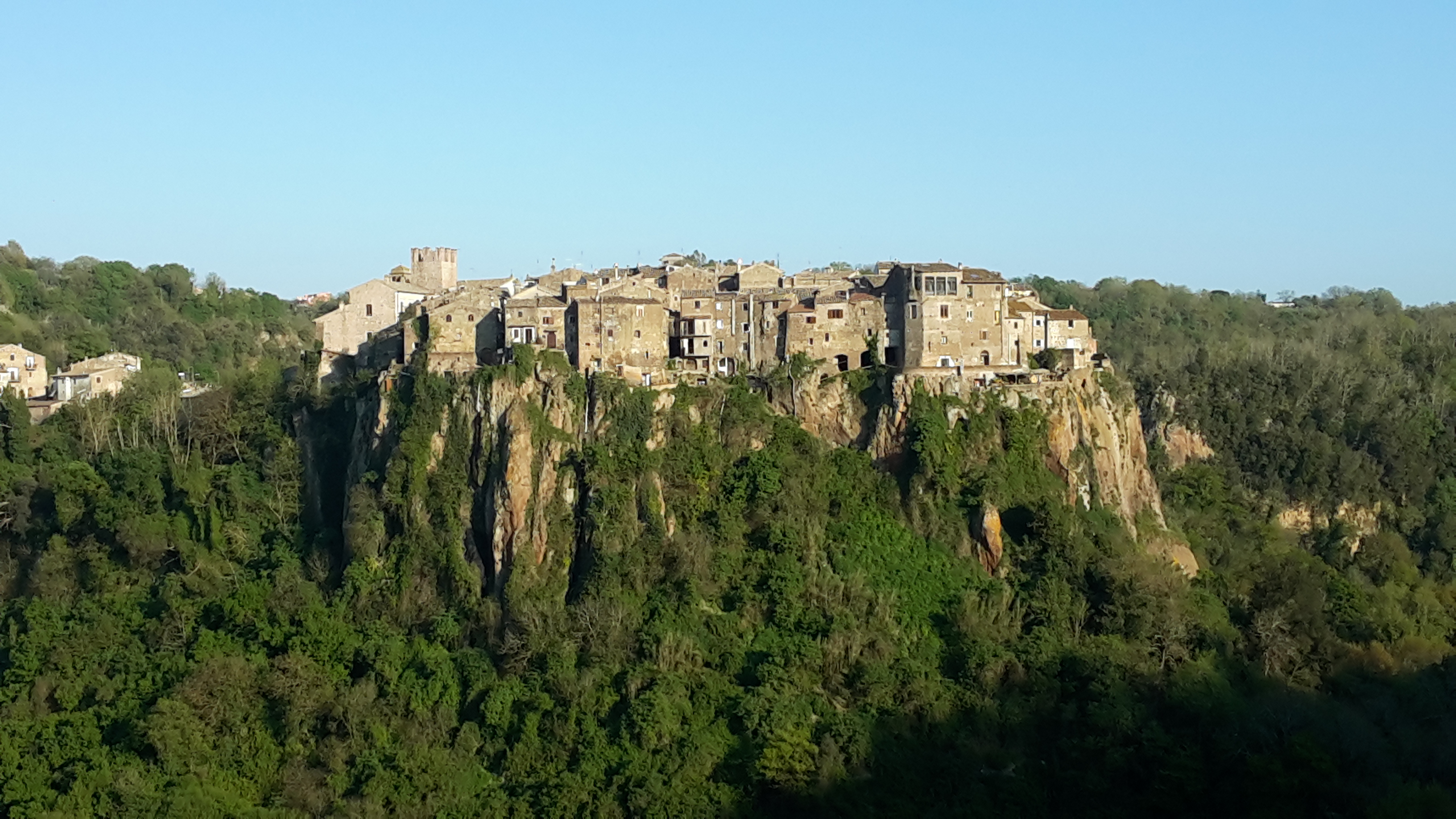

- Location within Italy Location within Lazio
- Coordinates: 42°13′N 12°25′E
- Country: Italy
- Region: Lazio
- Province: Viterbo (VT)

Government
  - Mayor: Sandra Pandolfi

Area
  - Total: 7.67 km^{2} (2.96 sq mi)
- Elevation: 172 m (564 ft)

Population (30 April 2017)
  - Total: 906
  - Density: 118/km^{2} (306/sq mi)
- Demonym: Calcatesi
- Time zone: UTC+1 (CET)
  - Summer (DST): UTC+2 (CEST)
- Postal code: 01030
- Dialing code: 0761
- Website: Official website

Calcata (locally Cargàta) is a comune and town in the Province of Viterbo in the Italian region Lazio, located 47 km (29 miles) north of Rome by car, overlooking the valley of Treja river.

Calcata borders the following municipalities: Faleria, Magliano Romano, Mazzano Romano, Rignano Flaminio.

In the 1930s, the hill town's fortified historic centre was condemned by the government for fear that the volcanic cliffs the ancient community was built upon would collapse. Local residents moved to nearby Calcata Nuova. In the 1960s, the emptied historical centre began to be repopulated by artists and hippies who squatted in its medieval stone and masonry structures. Many of the squatters eventually purchased their homes, the government reversed its condemnation order, and the residents of what had become an artistic community began restoring the ancient town. This trend has continued. The town has a thriving artistic community which was described in The New York Times in 2007 as what "may be the grooviest village in Italy, home to a wacky community of about 100 artists, bohemians, aging hippies and New Age types." The community of artists, together with visitors from nearby Rome who come to the village at weekends, has contributed to its development as a local cultural centre in the region.

The historical centre now includes restaurants, cafes, and art galleries.

== Main sights ==
- Old Town
- Palazzo Baronale degli Anguillara, dating from the 10th to 13th century but restored from 1995.
- Church of Santissimo Nome di Gesù, dating from the 14th century but restored from 1793.
- Troni di Calcata (Thrones of Calcata), tuff sculptures by artist Costantino Morosin.
- Church of San Cornelio e San Cipriano in Calcata Nuova designed by architect Paolo Portoghesi.
- Sub-urban Park of Treja Valley.
- Remains of the Faliscan temple of Monte Li Santi (outside the village).
- Remains of the Faliscan town of Narce (outside the village).
- Opera Bosco - Museum of Art in Nature. The museum was opened to the public in 1996 by a collective of artists led by Anne Demijttenaere and Costantino Morosin. It features about 50 artworks made only with natural material from the wood. The museum is a path through a lush forest in which artworks arise.

== Holy Prepuce of Calcata ==
According to legends of the village of Calcata, in 1527 a soldier in the German army sacking Rome looted the Sanctum sanctorum. When he was eventually captured in the village, he hid the jeweled reliquary containing the Holy Prepuce in his cell, where it was discovered in 1557. It was officially venerated by the Catholic Church in Calcata since that time, with the Vatican's offering a ten-year indulgence to pilgrims. Calcata became a popular site for pilgrimage.

Again in 1856, however, the Charroux Abbey rediscovered what it considered to be the true Holy Prepuce, which it claimed to have received from Charlemagne. It had been lost for centuries. The rediscovery led to a clash with people over the established Holy Prepuce of Calcata, which had been officially venerated by the Church for hundreds of years. In 1900, the Catholic Church solved the dilemma by ruling that anyone writing or speaking of the Holy Prepuce would be excommunicated with the status of a toleratus. In 1954, after much debate, the punishment was changed to the harsher degree of excommunication with the status of a vitandus (shunned). Later the Second Vatican Council removed the Day of the Holy Circumcision from the church calendar in its review of holy days and obligations.

In reality, it was more than two years before 11 October 1962, the date when the Second Vatican Council began, that a 25 July 1960 decree of Pope John XXIII enacted a wide-ranging revision of the General Roman Calendar, which included changing the name of the 1 January feast from "Circumcision of the Lord and Octave of the Nativity" to "Octave of the Nativity", with no change of the Gospel reading about the circumcision of the child Jesus.

Roger Peyrefitte, in his novel Les Clés de Sainte Pierre (1955), written using information attributed to Mgr Léon Gromier (1879–1965), Canon of St. Peter's, gives details of the 1954 discussion of such relics and of a pilgrimage to Calcata, including what appears to be an authentic description of the relic as: "two greyish membranes with an undertone of pink, curled into balls" lying on a crystal disk.

Calcata continued to stage an annual procession on the Day of the Holy Circumcision to honor the relic. In 1983, however, parish priest Dario Magnoni announced, "This year, the holy relic will not be exposed to the devotion of the faithful. It has vanished. Sacrilegious thieves have taken it from my home." He had reportedly kept it in a shoebox in the back of a wardrobe. Citing the Vatican's decree of excommunication, Magnoni refuses to further discuss the event, as does the Vatican. As a result, villagers' theories of the crime vary from theft for lucrative resale to an effort by the Vatican to quietly put an end to the practice it had attempted to end by excommunication years ago. Some residents speculate that Magnoni may have been the culprit.
