= Faleria =

- Comune
- Comune di Faleria
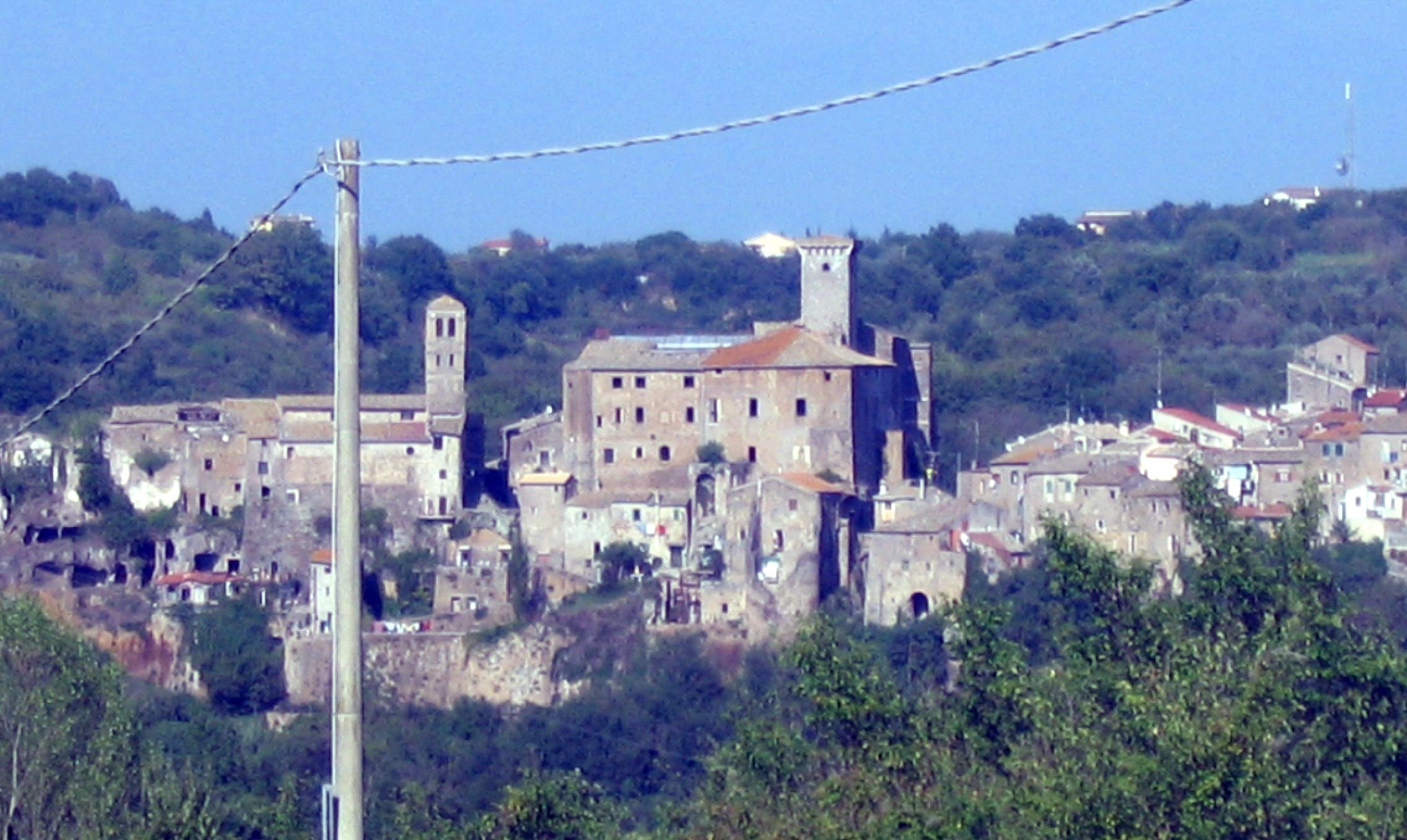

- Location within Italy Location within Lazio
- Coordinates: 42°13′N 12°26′E
- Country: Italy
- Region: Lazio
- Province: Province of Viterbo (VT)

Government
  - Mayor: Walter Salvadori

Area
  - Total: 25.68 km^{2} (9.92 sq mi)
- Elevation: 202 m (663 ft)

Population (31 July 2017)
  - Total: 2,143
  - Density: 83.45/km^{2} (216.1/sq mi)
- Demonym: Faleriani
- Time zone: UTC+1 (CET)
  - Summer (DST): UTC+2 (CEST)
- Postal code: 01030
- Dialing code: 0761
- Website: Official website

Faleria is a comune (municipality) in the Province of Viterbo in the Italian region of Latium, located about 35 kilometres (22 mi) north of Rome and about 35 kilometres (22 mi) southeast of Viterbo.

Faleria borders the following municipalities: Calcata, Castel Sant'Elia, Civita Castellana, Mazzano Romano, Rignano Flaminio, Sant'Oreste.
