= Rosina Wachtmeister =

Austrian artist (born c. 1939)

Rosina Wachtmeister (born in Vienna, 1939) is an Austrian artist, whose work includes cat sculptures and portraits. Her family moved to Brazil when she was 14, and she later graduated from the University of Porto Alegre in Brazil. Her Das Lied von der Liebe is a book whose graphics illustrate the biblical Song of Songs.

A list of her books can be seen at the website of the German National Library.

== Publications ==
- Wachtmeister, Rosina: Das Lied von der Liebe. Pattloch, Munich, 2004. ISBN 3-629-01240-X.
