= Domusculta =

Papal estate

A domusculta (pl.: domuscultae) was a papal estate in Italy in the Middle Ages, or the large villa complex at the centre of such an estate. An example is the Domusculta Capracorum of Pope Adrian I. They were similar to the papal patrimonia of the same period.
