= Castelnuovo di Porto =

- Comune
- Comune di Castelnuovo di Porto
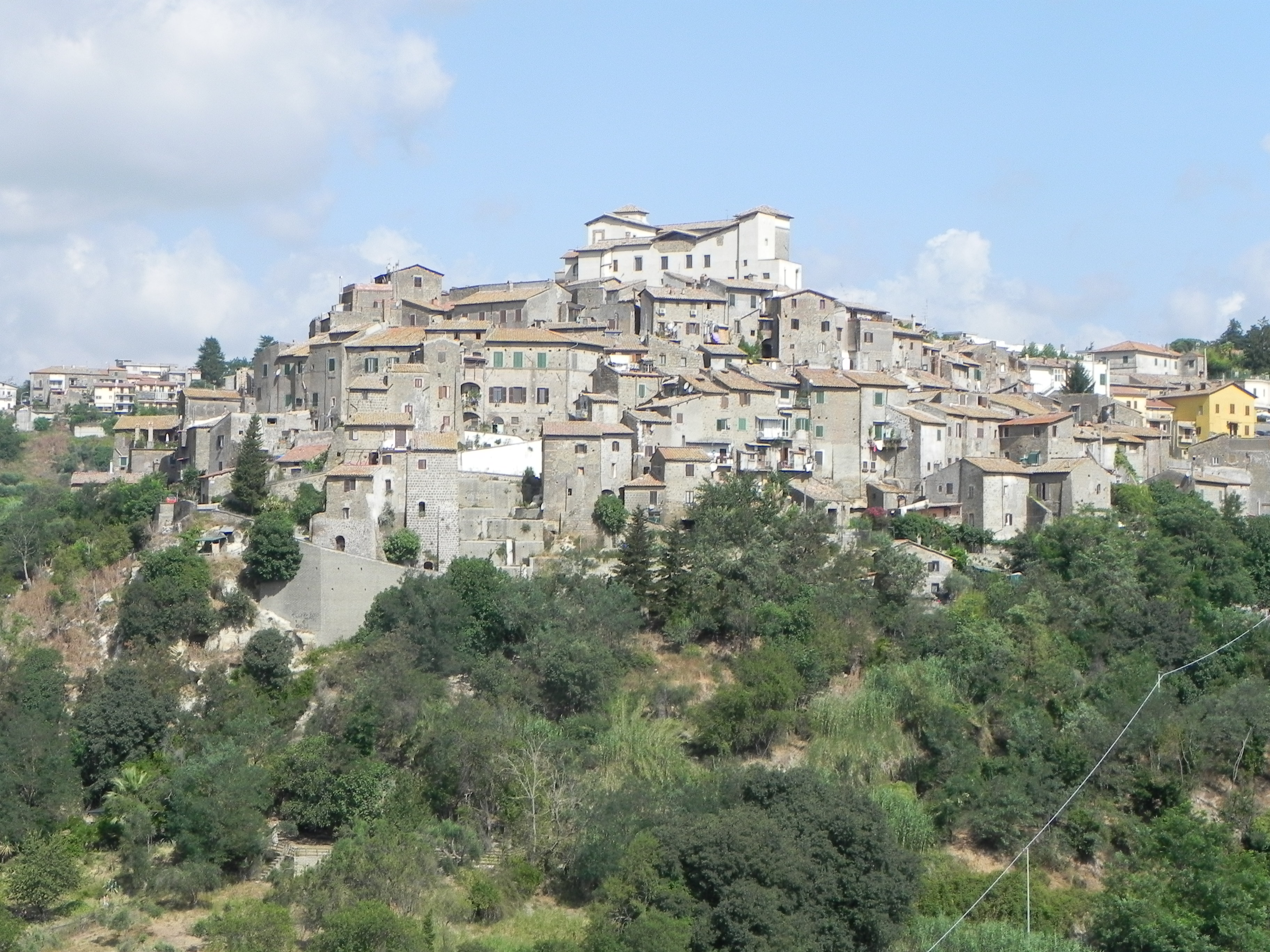

- Location within Italy Location within Lazio
- Coordinates: 42°8′N 12°30′E
- Country: Italy
- Region: Lazio
- Metropolitan city: Rome (RM)
- Frazioni: Pontestorto, Montelungo, Valleioro, Vallelinda

Government
  - Mayor: Riccardo Travaglini

Area
  - Total: 30.8 km^{2} (11.9 sq mi)
- Elevation: 250 m (820 ft)

Population (2008)
  - Total: 8,544
  - Density: 277/km^{2} (718/sq mi)
- Demonym: Castelnovesi
- Time zone: UTC+1 (CET)
  - Summer (DST): UTC+2 (CEST)
- Postal code: 00060
- Dialing code: 06

Castelnuovo di Porto is a comune (municipality) in the Metropolitan City of Rome in the Italian region Lazio, located about 25 kilometres (16 mi) north of Rome. It is one of I Borghi più belli d'Italia ("The most beautiful villages of Italy").

== Places of interest ==
=== Military architecture ===
- Rocca Colonna

=== Natural areas ===
- Veio Regional Park
