= Angel Haze discography =

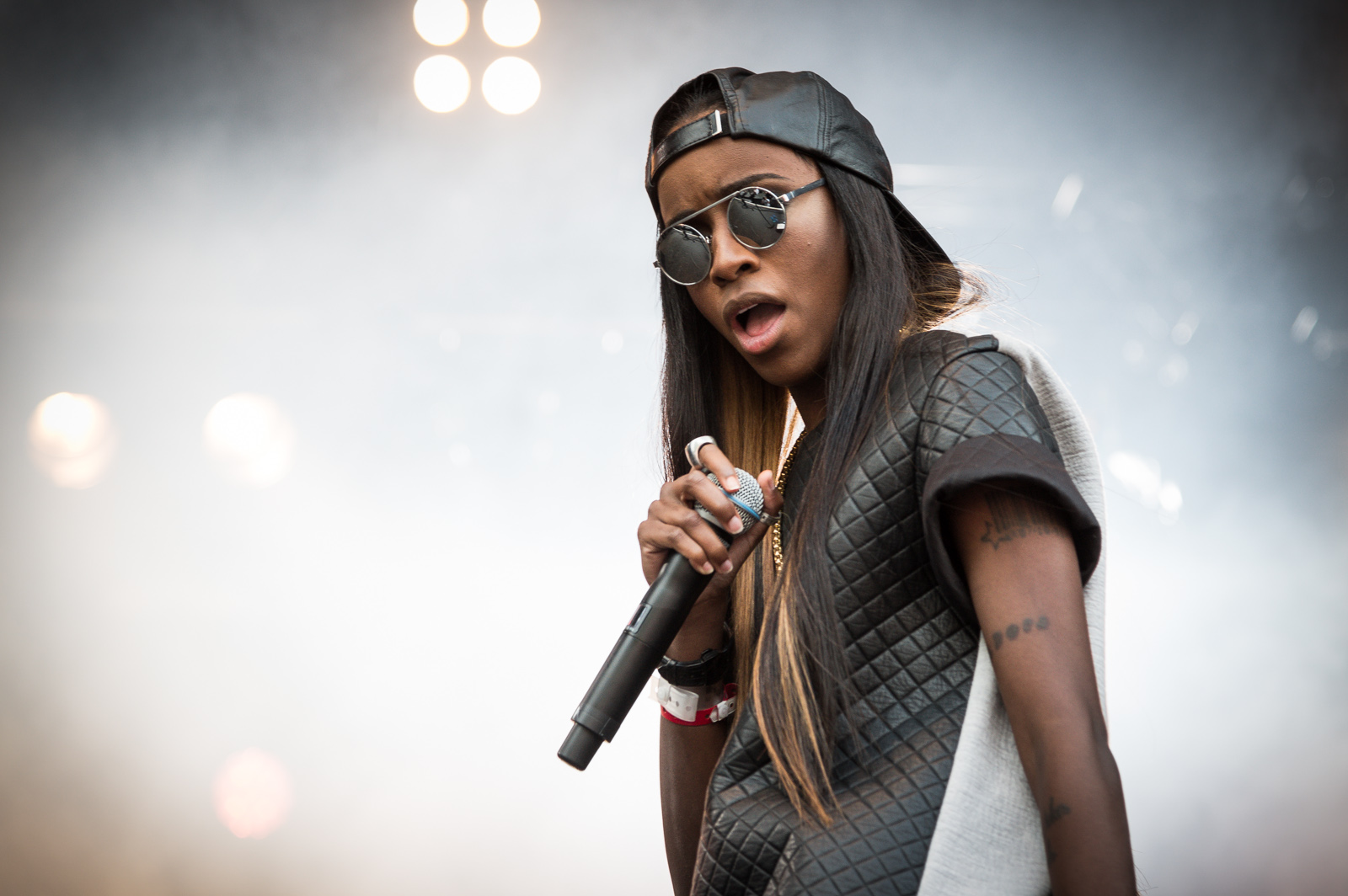
- Angel Haze performing at Øyafestivalen in 2013
- Studio albums: 2
- EPs: 2
- Singles: 19
- Mixtapes: 4

American rapper Angel Haze has released one studio album, one internet album, two extended plays (EPs), four mixtapes and nineteen singles (including four as a featured artist and nine promotional singles). In July 2012, after releasing two prior mixtapes, Haze released a mixtape Reservation online for free. The title is inspired by the act of reserving a table at a restaurant, saying "[...] For me, it's like that with the rap industry. I made my reservation there [...] and now I'm finally arriving". The lead single "New York" peaked at number 58 on the UK Singles Chart, and number 12 on the UK R&B Singles Chart. Shortly after, Haze released a commercial EP compiled of tracks from Reservation, titled New York, followed by a fourth mixtape, Classick. Throughout late 2013, during the run-up to the release of the debut album, Haze released a cover of a popular song every day, for thirty days. Most famous from these freestyles was the adaptation of Macklemore and Ryan Lewis's track "Same Love", which discusses childhood, prejudice, homophobia and sexuality. The series was dubbed 30 Gold.

In late 2013, Haze leaked their debut album Dirty Gold after a disagreement with the record label, who wanted to put out the album sometime in early 2014. Due to Haze's leaking of the project, their label quickly released the album, and it was officially distributed to online retailers on December 30, 2013. It was a commercial failure, with reports claiming that the album may have sold as few as 850 copies in its debut week. Dirty Gold was preceded by the single "Echelon (It's My Way)" and spawned the single "Battle Cry" which featured Australian singer Sia. The latter of the singles achieved minor success in the UK, peaking at number 70 on the UK Singles Chart, and 12 on the UK R&B Singles Chart.

In February 2015, after a year of touring, two promotional singles were released to promote Haze's upcoming projects, titled "CANDLXS" and "GXMES". On September 14, 2015, Haze released a project titled Back to the Woods which was described as "something to share before [the] sophomore".

== Albums ==
=== Studio albums ===
List of studio albums, with selected details and chart positions
Title	Details	Peak chart positions		
Title	Details	US Heat	UK	UK R&B
Dirty Gold	Released: December 30, 2013; Label: Republic, Island; Formats: CD, digital download	15	196	22
Back to the Woods	Released: September 14, 2015; Label: Self-released; Format: Digital download	—	—	—

=== EPs ===
List of EPs, with selected details
Title	Details
New York	Released: October 5, 2012; Label: Republic; Format: Digital download
Spotify Sessions	Released: August 23, 2013; Label: Republic; Format: Streamed audio
Girl With the Gun	Released: November 19, 2021; Label: Self-released; Format: Streamed audio
Purge!	Released: November 8, 2025; Label: Long Flight Home; Format: Streamed audio

=== Mixtapes ===
List of mixtapes, with selected details
Title	Details
King	Released: July 12, 2011; Label: Self-released; Format: Digital download
Voice	Released: April 19, 2012; Label: Self-released; Format: Digital download
Reservation	Released: July 17, 2012; Labels: Biz 3, Noizy Cricket, True Panther; Format: Digital download
Classick	Released: October 25, 2012; Label: Self-released; Format: Digital download

== Singles ==
=== As lead artist ===
List of singles as lead artist, with selected details and chart positions
Title	Year	Peak chart positions		Album
Title	Year	UK	UK R&B	Album
"New York"	2012	58	12	Reservation
"Echelon (It's My Way)"	2013	—	—	Dirty Gold
"Battle Cry" (featuring Sia)	2014	70	12	Dirty Gold
"Impossible"	2015	—	—	Back to the Woods
"Babe Ruthless"	2015	—	—	Back to the Woods
"Moonrise Kingdom"	2015	—	—	Back to the Woods
"Resurrection"	2016	—	—	Roses Will Rise Again (unreleased)
"No Limits"	2017	—	—	No Limits
"Brooklyn"	2018	—	—	Brooklyn
"Weight"	2021	—	—	Girl With A Gun EP
"Never Seen"	2021	—	—	Girl With A Gun EP
"—" denotes a recording that did not chart or was not released in that territory.

=== As featured artist ===
List of singles as a featured artist, with selected details and chart positions
Title	Year	Album
"Lootin in London" (RDGLDGRN featuring Angel Haze)	2013	Red Gold Green
"I Own It" (Nacey featuring Angel Haze)	2014	Non-album singles
"NSFW" (Timeflies featuring Angel Haze)	2015	Non-album singles
"Pleasure This Pain" (Kwamie Liv featuring Angel Haze)	2015	Non-album singles

=== Promotional singles ===
List of promotional singles, with selected details and chart positions
Title	Year	Peak chart positions	Album
Title	Year	US Pop Digital	Album
"Werkin' Girls"	2012	—	Reservation
"Hot Like Fire"	2012	—	Reservation
"Cleaning Out My Closet"	2012	—	Classick
"Hell Could Freeze" (Rudimental featuring Angel Haze)	2013	—	Home
"No Bueno"	2013	—	Non-album single
"Numb" (Nick Jonas featuring Angel Haze)	2014	45	Nick Jonas
"22 Jump Street" (featuring Ludacris)	2014	—	22 Jump Street
"CANDLXS"	2015	—	Non-album singles
"GXMES"	2015	—	Non-album singles
"—" denotes a recording that did not chart or was not released in that territory.

== Other charted songs ==
List of non-single charting songs, with selected details and chart positions
Title	Year	Peak chart positions	Album
Title	Year	US Dance Digital	Album
"Freestyle" (Bassnectar featuring Angel Haze)	2012	32	Freestyle

== Other releases ==
=== 30 Gold ===
List of tracks released during Haze's 30 Gold series, with select details.
Title	Date	Original song	Original artist
"Black Skinhead" (Freestyle)	October 14, 2013	"Black Skinhead"	Kanye West
"Tom Ford" (Freestyle)	October 15, 2013	"Tom Ford"	Jay Z
"Worst Behavior" (Freestyle)	October 16, 2013	"Worst Behavior"	Drake
"Backseat Freestyle" (Freestyle)	October 17, 2013	"Backseat Freestyle"	Kendrick Lamar
"Shabba" (Freestyle)	October 18, 2013	"Shabba"	A$AP Ferg
"Same Love" (Freestyle)	October 22, 2013	"Same Love"	Macklemore & Ryan Lewis
"Wrecking Ball" (Acoustic Cover)	October 24, 2013	"Wrecking Ball"	Miley Cyrus
"New York" (Remix)	October 30, 2013	"New York"	Angel Haze
"Summertime Sadness" (Lana Del Rey Cover)	November 2, 2013	"Summertime Sadness"	Lana Del Rey
"Love Me Again"	November 9, 2013	"Love Me Again"	John Newman
"Counting Stars" (OneRepublic Cover)	November 18, 2013	"Counting Stars"	OneRepublic

=== Guest appearances ===
List of non-single guest appearances, showing other artist(s), year released and album name
Title	Year	Other artist(s)	Album
"Freestyle"	2012	Bassnectar	Freestyle
"Can't Trust 'Em" (Remix)	2012	Dizzy Wright, Jarren Benton	Free SmokeOut Conversations
"Shit, Man!"	2013	Skylar Grey	Don't Look Down
"Papaoutai" (Remix)	2013	Stromae	Racine carrée
"Eating Rappers"	2013	Crudbump	The Judas Beats Album
"Illuminati Shit"	2013	Crudbump	The Judas Beats Album
"I Love You"	2013	Woodkid	None
"Okay"	2013	Paris Jones	You're Invited (To the Assassination of Patrick Campbell)
"Weapon"	2014	Bastille	Other People's Heartache, Pt. III
"Problem" (Remix)	2014	Natalia Kills	None
"808" (Remix)	2014	The Saturdays	None
"Life Round Here"	2014	Ellie Goulding	None
"Ribcage"	2014	Mary Lambert	Heart On My Sleeve
