= New York =

New York most commonly refers to:

- New York City, the most populous city in the US, in the state of New York
- New York (state), in the northeastern US

New York may also refer to:

== Places ==
=== United Kingdom ===
- New York, Lincolnshire
- New York, North Yorkshire
- New York, Tyne and Wear

=== United States ===
==== New York state ====
- New York metropolitan area, the region encompassing New York City and its suburbs
- New York County, covering the same area as the New York City borough of Manhattan
- New York, the US Postal Service address for Manhattan
- Province of New York, the British colony preceding the state of New York

==== Other states ====
- New York, Florida, an unincorporated community in Santa Rosa County
- New York, Iowa, a former town in Wayne County
- New York, Kentucky, an unincorporated community in Ballard County
- New York, Missouri, a ghost town in Scott County
- New York, Texas, an unincorporated community in Henderson County
- New York Mountain, a mountain in Colorado
- New York Mountains, a mountain range in California

=== Ukraine ===
- New York, Ukraine, a settlement in Donetsk Oblast

== Film and television ==
- New York (1916 film), a lost American silent comedy drama by George Fitzmaurice
- New York (1927 film), an American silent drama by Luther Reed
- New York (2009 film), a Bollywood film by Kabir Khan
- New York: A Documentary Film, a film by Ric Burns
- "New York" (Glee), an episode of Glee

== Literature ==
- New York (Burgess book), a 1976 work of travel and observation by Anthony Burgess
- New York (Morand book), a 1930 travel book by Paul Morand
- New York (novel), a 2009 historical novel by Edward Rutherfurd
- New York (magazine), a bi-weekly magazine founded in 1968

== Music ==
=== Albums and EPs ===
- New York EP, by Angel Haze, 2012
- New York (album), by Lou Reed, 1989
- New York, an album by Antti Tuisku, 2006

=== Songs ===
- "New York" (Addison Rae song), 2025
- "New York" (Angel Haze song), 2012
- "New York" (Eskimo Joe song), 2007
- "New York" (Ja Rule song), 2004
- "New York" (Paloma Faith song), 2009
- "New York" (Snow Patrol song), 2011
- "New York" (St. Vincent song), 2017
- "New York" (U2 song), 2000
- "New York", by Andrew Belle from Dive Deep, 2017
- "New York", by Ed Sheeran from X, 2013
- "New York", by Junior Varsity, 2024
- "New York", by Lucki from S*x M*ney Dr*gs, 2023
- "New York," by Rüfüs Du Sol from Inhale / Exhale, 2024
- "New York", by the Sex Pistols from Never Mind the Bollocks, Here's the Sex Pistols, 1977
- "New York", by Tash Sultana from Sugar, 2023
- "New York", from the musical Two Strangers (Carry a Cake Across New York), 2019

== Ships ==
- List of ships named New York
- List of ships named City of New York
- List of ships named New York City

== Sports ==
=== American football ===
- New York Giants, a member of the East Division of the National Football Conference of the National Football League (NFL) (1925–present)
- New York Jets, a member of the East Division of the American Football Conference of the NFL (1960–present)
- New York (World Series of Football), a professional football team for the World Series of Football (1902–1903)

=== Baseball ===
- New York Mets, a member of the East Division of the National League (NL) of Major League Baseball (MLB) (1962–present)
- New York Yankees, a member of the East Division of the American League of MLB (1903–present)
- New York Giants, an NL team now known as the San Francisco Giants (1885–1958)

=== Basketball ===
- New York Knicks, a member of the Atlantic Division of the Eastern Conference of the National Basketball Association (NBA)
- New York Nets, an American Basketball Association team that later became a member of the NBA and is now known as the Brooklyn Nets (1968–1977)

=== Hockey ===
- New York Islanders, a member of the Metropolitan Division of the Eastern Conference of the National Hockey League (NHL) (1972–present)
- New York Rangers, a member of the Metropolitan Division of the Eastern Conference of the NHL (1926–present)

=== Soccer ===
- New York City FC, a member of the Eastern Conference of Major League Soccer (MLS) (2015–present)
- New York Red Bulls, a member of the Eastern Conference of MLS (1996–present)
- New York Stadium in South Yorkshire, UK, home ground of Rotherham United F.C.
- New York Cosmos (disambiguation)

=== Other sports ===
- New York GAA, a county board of the Gaelic Athletic Association outside Ireland, responsible for Gaelic games in the New York metropolitan area

== Other uses ==
- New York (pinball), a 1976 pinball machine by Gottlieb
- New York (1983 typeface), an Apple font set for original Macintosh computers
- New York (2019 typeface), a font set for developing software on Apple platforms
- New York Harbor, a waterfront in New York City
- Brooklyn Navy Yard, referred to as New York in naval histories
- Tiffany Pollard (born 1982), star of the reality TV show I Love New York, who is nicknamed New York

== See also ==
- New York City (disambiguation)
- New York, New York (disambiguation)
- Nova Iorque, Brazilian municipality in the state of Maranhão
- Nowy Jork, former name of Łagiewniki, Włocławek County, Poland
- New York University, a private research university in New York City
- NY (disambiguation)
