= New York City (disambiguation) =

New York City is the most populous city in the United States.

New York City or City of New York may also refer to:

== Ships ==
- List of ships named New York City
- List of ships named City of New York

== Music ==
- New York City (band), an American R&B vocal group

=== Albums ===
- New York City (Brazilian Girls album), 2008
- New York City (The Peter Malick Group album) or the title song, 2003
- New York City: The Album, or the title song, by Troy Ave, 2013
- New York City (You're a Woman), or the title song, by Al Kooper, 1971
- New York City, by the Men, 2023

=== Songs ===
- "New York City" (The Armoury Show song), 1987
- "New York City" (The Chainsmokers song), 2015
- "New York City" (The Demics song), 1979
- "New York City" (Emigrate song), 2007
- "New York City" (John Lennon and Yoko Ono song), 1972
- "New York City" (Kylie Minogue song), 2019
- "New York City" (Lenny Kravitz song), 2014
- "New York City" (Owl City song), 2018
- "New York City" (T. Rex song), 1975
- "New York City", by Brotherhood of Man from Oh Boy!, 1977
- "New York City", by Cub from Come Out Come Out, 1995; covered by They Might Be Giants, 1996
- "New York City", by The Cult from Sonic Temple, 1989
- "New York City", by Hanoi Rocks from Twelve Shots on the Rocks, 2002
- "New York City", by Horse the Band from A Natural Death, 2007
- "New York City", by Joey Ramone from ...Ya Know?, 2012
- "New York City", by Mina Caputo, 2000
- "New York City", by Mason Jennings from Century Spring, 2002
- "New York City", by Moe from Dither, 2001
- "New York City", by Paul van Dyk from In Between, 2007
- "New York City", by the Statler Brothers from Bed of Rose's, 1970
- "New York City", by Zwol, 1978

== Other uses ==
- New York City (painting), 1942 painting by Piet Mondrian
- New York City (video game), a 1984 video game
- "New York City" (AJ and the Queen), a television episode
- New York City FC, an American professional soccer club based in New York City

== See also ==
- New York, New York (disambiguation)
- New York (disambiguation)
- NYC (disambiguation)
- CNY (disambiguation)
- cony (disambiguation)
- List of cities in New York, for New York State's cities
- City College of New York
- City University of New York
- New City, New York
- New Pork City, a location in the Japan only game Mother 3
