= Coniglio =

Coniglio (pronounced [koˈniʎʎo]) is an Italian surname meaning "Rabbit", derived from the Latin cuniculus. Notable people with the surname include:

- Agnaldo Coniglio Rayol (born 1938), Brazilian singer and actor
- Fernando Coniglio (born 1991), Argentine football player
- Giuseppe Coniglio (1922–2006), Italian poet
- Joe Coniglio (born 1985), American football coach
- Joseph Coniglio (born 1943), American politician
- Mark Coniglio (born 1961), American composer
- Stephen Coniglio (born 1993), Australian football player

== See also ==
- Coniglio alla sanremese
- Coney (disambiguation)
- Cuniculus (disambiguation)
