= New York, New York (disambiguation) =

New York, New York, also known as New York City, is a city in the U.S. state of New York.

New York, New York, may also refer to:

- Manhattan, a borough of New York City, coterminous with New York County and designated as New York, New York, by the US Postal Service

== Music ==
- New York, N.Y. (album), a 1959 jazz album by George Russell
- "Theme from New York, New York", a 1977 song composed by Kander and Ebb for Liza Minnelli, later covered by Frank Sinatra
- New York, New York (soundtrack), the 1977 soundtrack of Martin Scorsese musical film.
- "New York, New York" (On the Town), a song from the 1944 musical On the Town
- "New York, New York", a song by The Last Poets from their eponymous album, 1970
- "New York, New York", a song by Duke Ellington, from his Eastbourne Performance (1973) recording
- "New York, New York", a song by 1973 from The Band Plays On, 1975
- "New York, New York (So Good They Named It Twice)", a 1978 song by Gerard Kenny
- "New York, New York", a song by Johnny Winter from Raisin' Cain, 1980
- "New York New York" (Grandmaster Flash and the Furious Five song), 1983
- "New York / N.Y.", a 1983 song by Nina Hagen
- "New York, New York" (Tha Dogg Pound song), 1995
- "New York, New York" (Ryan Adams song), 2001
- "New York, New York" (Ja Rule song), 2004
- "New York, New York" (Moby song), 2006

== Films ==
- New York, New York (1977 film), a drama by Martin Scorsese
- N.Y., N.Y. (film), a 1957 short by Francis Thompson
- New York New York (2016 film), a Chinese–Hong Kong romantic drama

== Other uses ==
- New York New York (manga), a 1995 manga by Marimo Ragawa
- New York, New York (musical), 2023 Broadway musical
- "New York, New York" (Friday Night Lights), an episode of the TV series Friday Night Lights
- New York, New York (supplement), for Marvel Super Heroes role-playing game

== See also ==
- New York-New York Hotel and Casino, on the Las Vegas Strip in Nevada
- New York (disambiguation)
- New York City (disambiguation)
- NYC (disambiguation)
- NY (disambiguation)
