= History of New York =

History of New York may refer to:

- History of New York City, about the history of New York City
- History of New York (state), about the history of the State of New York

== See also ==
- New York (disambiguation)
