= City of New York (disambiguation) =

City of New York most commonly refers to New York City, the most populous city in the United States.

The term may also refer to:

- The government of New York City, for which "City of New York" is sometimes used as a metonym
- A number of ships, see List of ships named City of New York
