= Coney =

Coney may refer to:

== Places ==
- Côney, a river in eastern France
- Coney, Georgia, an unincorporated community in the United States
- Coney Island (disambiguation)
- Coney Mountain, a mountain in New York state

== People ==
- Dean Coney (born 1963), English footballer
- Hykiem Coney (1982–2006), American anti-gang activist
- Jeremy Coney (born 1952), New Zealand cricketer
- Malachy Coney (fl. 1989–2011), Irish comic writer
- Michael G. Coney (1932–2005), English science fiction writer
- Ray Coney (born 2005), American football player
- Sandra Coney (born 1944), New Zealand feminist and women's health campaigner
- Te'Von Coney (born 1997), American football player
- Theodore Edward Coneys (1882–1967), American murderer
- Coney Reyes (born 1953), Filipina actress
- Amy Coney Barrett (born 1972), American lawyer

== Animals ==
- The European rabbit
- Cephalopholis fulva, a species of fish
- Cuban coney, an extinct species of rodent
- Rock hyrax, called a coney in the King James Bible

== Food ==
- Coney Island hot dog
- White hot, a hot dog occasionally called a Coney

== Ships ==
- USS Edgar F. Coney, a United States Navy tug in commission from 1917 to 1919

== See also ==
- Cony (disambiguation)
- CNY (disambiguation)
- Kony (disambiguation)
