= Paris Jones =

Paris Jones may refer to:

- Paris Jones (male singer) (born 1990), American male singer
- PJ (singer), American female singer and musician born Paris Jones
