= Cony (surname) =

Cony is a surname. Notable people with the surname include:

- Carlos Heitor Cony (1926–2018), Brazilian journalist and author
- Edward R. Cony (1923–2000), American journalist and newspaper executive
- Joseph S. Cony (1834–1867), United States Navy officer
- Samuel Cony (1811–1870), American politician, 31st governor of Maine
- William Cony (died 1707), British navy captain

== See also ==
- Coney (disambiguation), which includes a list of people with the surname
