= Kony, Inc. =

Defunct American software company

- Company type: Private company
- Industry: Enterprise software
- Founded: 2007 in Orlando, Florida
- Defunct: August 2019
- Fate: Acquired
- Successor: Temenos Group
- Headquarters: Austin, Texas, United States
- Area served: Worldwide
- Key people: Thomas E. Hogan (CEO), Kathy Crusco (EVP & CFO)
- Products: Mobile App Development platform
- Owner: Temenos Group
- Number of employees: 1,600+ (2019)
- Website: kony.com

Kony was an American cloud-based software company that provided mobility, omnichannel and internet of things systems and services. The company was based in Austin, Texas with over 1,600 employees worldwide.

At the time of its sale to Temenos Group in 2019, Kony operated out of 11 offices in the US, UK, Germany, The Netherlands, Brazil, Mexico, India, Hong Kong, and Australia.

== History ==
Founded in 2007 the then-Orlando-based company released its first product, the KonyOne Platform in 2009. In 2012, Kony acquired Australian SAP consulting company Sky Technologies.

In March 2014, former executive vice president of software at HP, Thomas E. Hogan, was named CEO. In May 2014, Kony announced a $50 million round of funding. Investors in the company include Softbank Capital, Hamilton Lane, Insight Venture Partners, Georgian Partners, Delta-v Capital and Telstra Ventures.

In June 2015, Kony moved its corporate headquarters from Orlando, Florida to Austin, Texas.

In June 2018, Kony launched Kony DBX, a digital banking platform and application suite. In October 2018, Kony acquired Pivotus, Inc, a subsidiary of Umpqua Holdings.

In August 2019, Kony was acquired by Temenos Group, which has since subsumed Kony.
