= Cony =

Cony may refer to:

- Cony (surname)
- Cony High School, a public school located in Augusta, Maine, United States
- Cony 360, a kei car, truck and van made by Aichi Kokuki
- USS Cony (DD-508), a destroyer which served in World War II
- Cony Lake, Idaho, United States
- Cony, a white rabbit character in Line chatting app

== See also ==
- Coney (disambiguation)
- CNY (disambiguation)
- Kony (disambiguation)
