= Cuniculus =

Cuniculus may mean:

- Cuniculus (water channel), diversionary water channels of Ancient Rome
- Cuniculus (genus), zoological genus of the pacas, three species of ground-dwelling, herbivorous rodents in South and Central America

== See also ==
- Orthogeomys cuniculus
- Oryctolagus cuniculus
