= CNY (disambiguation) =

CNY is the ISO 4217 code for Renminbi, the currency of the People's Republic of China.

CNY may also refer to:

- City of New York, the most populous city in the United States
- CNY (IATA code), for Canyonlands Field airport near Moab in Grand County, Utah, United States
- Chinese New Year, a traditional festival
- Central New York, the central region of upper New York State, United States
- ConnectNY, a former consortium of 12 academic libraries in New York State

== See also ==
- New York City (disambiguation)
- NYC (disambiguation)
- Cony (disambiguation)
- Crosby, Stills, Nash & Young (CSNY)
