= Reservation (mixtape) =

Mixtape by Angel Haze
- Released: July 17, 2012
- Recorded: 2011–2012
- Studio: Stadium Red; Covert Studios
- Genre: Hip-hop
- Length: 46:31
- Label: Biz 3; Noizy Cricket; True Panther
- Producer: Various: Angel Haze (exec.); Le'roy Benros (exec.); Hira Sky; The 83rd; Will Idap; The RIP; ODHI Beats; TK. Kayembe; Paris Jones; Trell Fields; North Kid

Angel Haze chronology
Voice (2012)	Reservation (2012)	New York (2012)

Singles from Reservation
- 1. "New York" Released: October 26, 2012

Reservation is the third mixtape by American rapper and singer Angel Haze. It was released on July 17, 2012, by labels Biz 3, Noizy Cricket and True Panther. Reservation received critical acclaim from critics, receiving an 88/100 score from aggregate review site Metacritic, while the BBC named it one of the best mixtapes of 2012.

Reservation was preceded by two promotional singles, "Werkin' Girls" and "Hot Like Fire". The mixtape spawned the single "New York", which became a top sixty UK hit, peaking at number fifty-eight on the UK Singles Chart, and number twelve on the UK R&B Chart.

== Background ==
In October 2012, five tracks from Reservation, including the single "New York" and "Werkin' Girls" were featured on Haze's first commercial release, an EP titled New York.

== Singles ==
The sole single from Reservation was titled "New York", and was initially released on June 28, 2012. The single was commercially released on October 26, 2012, three months after the initial release of the mixtape, to promote Haze's newer, commercially released EP, New York. The single received positive reviews, being cited as Pitchfork Media's 'Best New Track' for the week of June 28, 2012. Commercially, "New York" debuted on the UK Singles Chart at number fifty-eight in the week commencing October 14, 2012. The single also debuted at number twelve on the UK R&B Chart in the same week. A video for the single released and was directed by Adrienne Nicole, however it is currently a private video on Haze's YouTube channel, and therefore unavailable to audiences.

=== Promotional singles ===
On July 11, 2012, "Werkin' Girls" was released as the mixtapes first promotional single. Pitchfork Media named the song its 'Best New Track' for the week of October 12, 2012. Writer Jayson Greene commented that "You can hear that quietly seething confidence radiate through 'Werkin' Girls,' along with her sparking-live-wire charisma and glowering, old-school cipher bars". A music video for "Werkin' Girls" was released on October 10, 2012, and was directed by Alex Lee and Kyle Wightman.

On July 13, 2012, the song "Hot Like Fire" was released as the second promotional single from the mixtape, four days before the mixtapes release. Stereogum writer Tom Breihan called the track a "crushed-out conscious-rap joint".

== Critical reception ==
Professional ratings
Aggregate scores
Source	Rating
Metacritic	88/100
Review scores
Source	Rating
The A.V. Club	A−
Consequence of Sound	A−
The Guardian	4/5 stars
NME	8/10
NOW	4/5 stars
Pitchfork Media	8/10

Reservation received universal acclaim from music critics. At Metacritic, which assigns a normalised rating out of 100 to reviews from mainstream critics, it received an average score of 88, based on six reviews. Genevieve Koski for The A.V. Club gave the mixtape an A− rating, commenting on its variety, "Haze shows off her considerable range on the mixtape’s 14 tracks, as comfortable laying herself bare on songs like “This Is Me” and the gut-wrenching “Castle On A Cloud” as she is beating her chest and spitting fire on standout tracks “Werkin’ Girls” and “New York,” which employs a handclap-laden Gil Scott Heron sample to tremendous effect.". Consequence of Sound writer Katherine Flynn also gave Reservation an A− rating, comparing Haze to rapper Nicki Minaj, "Haze is certainly a challenger to the precedent that the de facto queen of rap Nicki Minaj has set in the past few years. Where Minaj is fantastical and over-the-top, Haze is understated and raw.".

In a four out of five star review, Alex Macpherson for The Guardian commented on Haze's progression from their previous mixtapes, stating that "her craft – lyrics, hooks and storytelling – has been tightened up without losing any of her intense intimacy", and concluding that "the concept of realness underpins hip-hop; the fearless, whipsmart talent of Angel Haze brings you face-to-face with the resonant reality of it".

=== Accolades ===
The BBC named Reservation as one of the six best mixtapes of 2012, with writer Mike Diver citing the project as a contributing factor for Haze being featured in the annual Sound of 2013 poll, which showcases new musical artists with exceptional potential. On mixtape distribution site DatPiff, the official release of Reservation has been downloaded over 48,000 times, earning it a bronze certification. Two tracks from Reservation were featured on year–end lists. "New York" placed at twenty–nine on NME's 50 Best Tracks of 2012 list, while "Werkin' Girls" placed at number seventy–five on Pitchfork Media's 100 Best Tracks of 2012, respectively.

Year	Organization	List	Work	Placing	Ref.
2012	BBC	Six best mixtapes of 2012	Reservation	No order	
2012	NME	50 Best Tracks of 2012	"New York"	29	
2012	Pitchfork Media	100 Best Tracks of 2012	"Werkin' Girls"	75	

== Track listing ==
Adapted from the mixtape's back cover.

Reservation — Standard version
No.	Title	Writer(s)	Producer	Length
1.	"This is Me"	Raee'n Roes Wilson	Hira Sky; The 83rd	4:37
2.	"Wicked Moon" (featuring Nicole Wray)	Wilson; Nicole Wray	The 83rd	4:47
3.	"CHI (Need to Know)"	Wilson	Will Idap	4:13
4.	"Supreme"	Wilson	The RIP	3:01
5.	"New York"	Wilson	The 83rd	3:29
6.	"Hot Like Fire"	Wilson	ODHI Beats	3:34
7.	"Werkin' Girls"	Wilson	TK. Kayembe	3:05
8.	"Gypsy Letters"	Wilson	Paris Jones	3:45
9.	"Jungle Fever" (Remix) (featuring Kool A.D.)	Wilson; Victor Vazquez	J. LA	4:17
10.	"Smiles and Hearts"	Wilson		3:20
11.	"Castle on a Cloud"	Wilson		3:20
12.	"Sufferings First"	Wilson		5:03
Total length:				46:31

Reservation — DatPiff version
No.	Title	Writer(s)	Producer	Length
10.	"Realest"	Wilson	Trell Fields	3:08
11.	"Castle on a Cloud"	Wilson	North Kid	3:20
12.	"Balance"	Sara Tavares		5:01
13.	"Drop It"	Wilson		3:19
14.	"Smiles and Hearts"	Wilson		6:20

Note: Haze does not contribute to track twelve ("Balance") on the DatPiff version of the mixtape. It is simply an insert of Sara Tavares's track.

== Personnel ==
Credits adapted from the mixtape's back cover.

Performance

- Angel Haze – primary artist
- Nicole Wray – featured artist
- Kool A.D. – featured artist
- Jerry Barnes – bass (track 6)

Producing

- Hira Sky – producer
- The 83rd – producer
- Will Idap – producer
- The RIP – producer
- ODHI Beats – producer
- TK. Kayembe – producer
- Paris Jones – producer
- Trell Fields – producer
- North Kid – producer

Technical

- Roman Vail – mastering
- Corey Hangover – mixing
- Will McNair – mixing

Miscellaneous

- Biz 3– publicity
- Anorak – publicity

== Release history ==
Country	Date	Format	Label	Ref.
Worldwide	July 17, 2012	Digital download	Biz 3; Noizy Cricket; True Panther	
