= Cuniculus (water channel) =

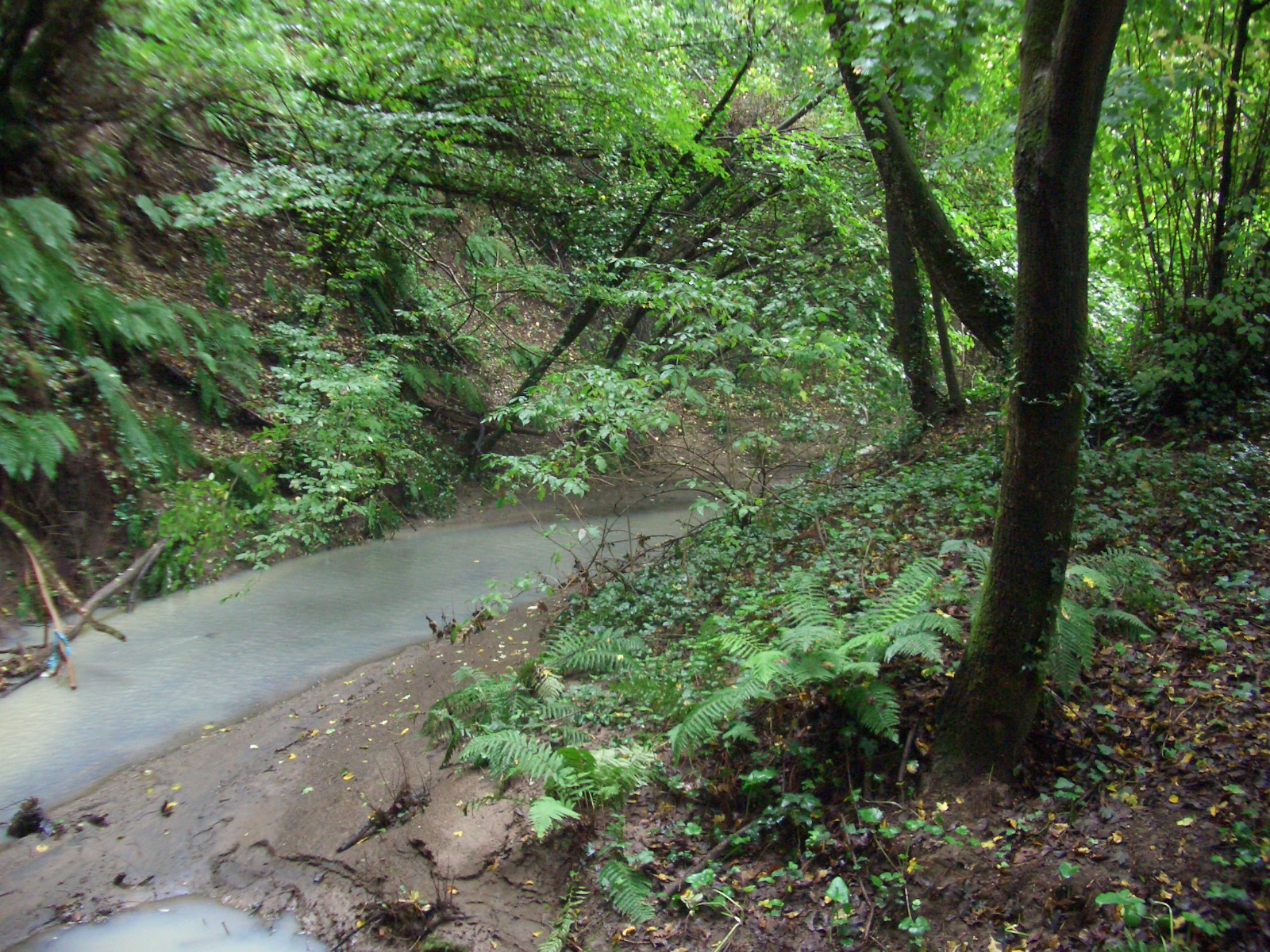
Fosso dei Costaroni, remains of an Etruscan cuniculus at Formello.

A cuniculus, plural cuniculi, is a diversionary water channel, used by ancient civilizations on the Italian Peninsula. As the general ancient Italian use derives from the Etruscan use, the term has a special significance of Etruscan cuniculi. The city of Veii was noted for them. The Italian community of Formello to the north of Veii was named after the numerous cuniculi there.

Cuniculi could take any form from trenches to a complex system of tunnels. The uses were multiple: irrigation, drainage, diversion, supply, and so on. The Romans used the cuniculi of Veii to mine into the citadel.

Cuniculi have multiple purposes. One of them was to keep villages and cities safe from erosion. North-west of Rome 42 km of cuniculi have been discovered; more than 22 km in and around Veii.
