= Paris Jones (male singer) =

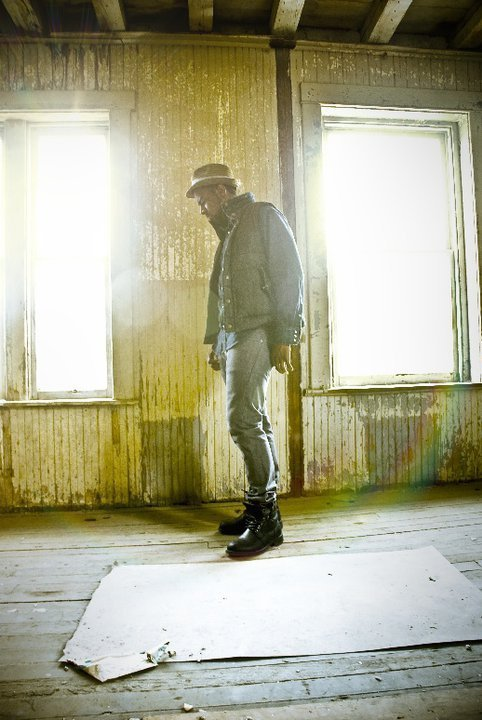

Background information
- Born: Patrick Campbell; July 12, 1990 (age 35); Inglewood, California
- Origin: California, USA
- Occupations: Rapper; Singer; Producer
- Years active: 2009–present
- Website: www.prsjon.com

Paris Jones (born Patrick Campbell, July 12, 1990) is an American singer, musician and producer from California and Virginia. His style has been described as experimental, eclectic and new age.

== Background ==
Campbell was born in Inglewood, California and raised in Palmdale. He credits his father with being the earliest influence on his music, saying that he "bought me my first DJ set (2 turntables and a 2 channel mixer before Serato lol) when I was 10 years old. He invested in my musical gifts every opportunity he could." He was once suspended from school for battle rapping.

He later attended Liberty University in Virginia. On his second day of college, one of his best friends in California was fatally shot, and Campbell increasingly turned to music as an outlet for his feelings. Early in his career, he adopted the stage name "Paris Jones": "Paris is for the finer things. People have joneses for shoes, etc. I have a Jones for living above the mediocre lives most are expected to just accept and live."

== Music ==
In 2010, Jones released a single "Popular" with a sample from the Broadway musical Wicked; when Kanye West released a video in which he used the same sample, false rumors began to spread that West had signed Jones.

In 2011, Jones met with executives at several major record labels but was not signed. He later described this as a blessing in disguise, preferring to maintain independent control of his own music. The Source named him its Unsigned Hype in October 2012.

Starting in 2011, he began work on the material that would become You’re Invited to the Assassination of Patrick Campbell… The album explores the process of Jones shedding his identity and baggage as "Patrick Campbell" to become a new, mature individual and artist. The album debuted in 2013 on Yahoo! Music, which described it as "Auto-Tune ballads ("Ashley Brown"), easy, soul-stirring mid-tempos ("Okay"), drum and bass infused underground hip-hop tracks ("Name Droppin'"), spacey, hypnotic metaphor treats ("Birds And Horses") and an experimental interpretation of Drake's "I'll Take Care Of You" that has been slowed down to chopped and screwed like speed." "Make It Hot / The Assassination" features voiceover contributions from American actor Jesse Cole Best and disc-jockey Killgxxd, both Virginia natives. "Make It Hot..." is a skit track that aggregates the aforentioned themes on the album into a skit describing the moment the anthropomorphized antagonist of the record, Patrick Campbell, is found dead, giving the evolved version "Paris Jones" his figurative birth and introducing him as the protagonist.

"You're Invited…" received positive reviews, particularly its track "Summer". The track "Okay" on which Angel Haze appears was also singled out for praise by several reviewers. Ghettoblaster magazine described Jones and Haze as "one hell of a tag team." Jenesis wrote that listeners were "in for a treat." Yahoo! Music wrote that Jones "intermixes his singing and raps with ease and is free enough to take on topics that introspective or braggadocio." Crave praised the "enchantingly smooth gravity in the track framework to Jones' soulful flow. Earmilk wrote that "Everything from the album title to the politically charged images to which you can find on his Instagram just screams unique. The vision that Paris Jones has for his music is definitely something I've not seen for quite a while."

Jones released one EP a month throughout 2014, titling each after the month of its release. He stated in an interview that he was inspired by the prolific creation of 2pac and J Dilla, and wanted to train himself to produce music constantly. Jerard Fagerberg of the Boston Globe site BDCWire praised "the extremely dedicated work" but noted that "'December' surely isn’t his most gripping entry."

Jones' song "You Like Me" has become a popular source for remixes, most notably by OZZIE and Tails.

== Producing ==
Jones produced the track "Gypsy Letters" on Angel Haze’s mixtape Reservation and has produced for Nitty Scott, MC.

== Discography ==
- J.A.P.A.N. 2 Paris (2009)
- From Paris with Love (2010)
- The Black Hour EP (2011)
- You’re Invited (to the Assassination of Patrick Campbell) (2013)
- January – December monthly EPs (2014)
- Zephaniah's Book of Trees (2021)
