= Coney Island (disambiguation) =

Coney Island is a neighborhood, visitor attraction, and former island in Brooklyn, New York.

Coney Island may also refer to:

== Places ==
=== Bermuda ===
- Coney Island, Bermuda, an island in St. George's Parish

=== Northern Ireland ===
- Coney Island, Lough Neagh, an island in County Armagh
- Coney Island, County Down, a townland and peninsula in County Down
- Coney Island, County Fermanagh or Inish Rath, an island and townland in County Fermanagh
- Coney Island, County Londonderry, a townland in County Londonderry

=== Republic of Ireland ===
- Coney Island, County Sligo or Inishmulclohy, an island and townland in County Sligo
- Coney Island, County Clare, an island and townland in County Clare
- Coney Island, County Cork, a townland in County Cork
- Coney Island, County Donegal, a townland in County Donegal

=== Singapore ===
- Coney Island, Singapore or Pulau Serangoon, an island off the coast of Punggol in Singapore
  - Coney Island Park, a park on that island

=== United States ===
- related to main meaning Coney Island visitor attraction, and former island in Brooklyn, New York.
  - Coney Island Avenue, a roadway from central Brooklyn to Coney Island in New York City
  - Coney Island–Stillwell Avenue (New York City Subway), a New York City Subway station
- Coney Island, Minnesota, an unincorporated community
- Coney Island, Missouri, a village
- Coney Island (Cincinnati), an amusement park
- Coney Island (West Virginia), an island

=== Other geographical uses ===
- Coney Island (restaurant), a distinctive Detroit-centered type of restaurant that serves Coney hot dogs

== Film ==
- Coney Island (1917 film), a silent comedy film starring Fatty Arbuckle and Buster Keaton
- Coney Island (1928 film), a film by Ralph Ince starring Lois Wilson, Lucille Mendez and Eugene Strong
- Coney Island (1943 film), a musical film starring Betty Grable
- Coney Island (1991 film), a documentary film about the island

== Music ==
- Coney Island (album), a 1975 album by Herb Alpert and The T.J.B.
- "Coney Island" (Van Morrison song), a 1989 spoken-word piece by Van Morrison
- "Coney Island", a 2001 song by Death Cab for Cutie from The Photo Album
- "Coney Island", a 2010 song by the Coral from Butterfly House
- "Coney Island" (Taylor Swift song), a 2020 song by Taylor Swift featuring the National from Evermore

== See also ==
- Coney (disambiguation)
- Coney Island hot dog
