= NY =

NY most often refers to:

- New York (state), a state in the Northeastern United States
- New York City, officially "New York", the most populous city in the United States, located in the state of New York

NY, Ny or ny may also refer to:

== Places ==
- North Yorkshire, an English county
- Ny, Belgium, a village
- Old number plate of German small town Niesky

== People ==
- Eric Ny (1909–1945), Swedish runner
- Marianne Ny, Swedish prosecutor

== Letters ==
- ny (digraph), an alphabetic letter
- Nu (letter), the 13th letter of the Greek alphabet, transcribed as "Ny"
- ñ (énye), sometimes transcribed as "ny"
- Voiced palatal nasal, found in English as "ny"

== Other uses ==
- New Year
- Air Iceland (IATA code: NY)
- Chewa language (ISO 639-1 code: ny)

== See also ==
- New Year (disambiguation)
- New York (disambiguation)
- NYC (disambiguation)
- NYS (disambiguation)
