= List of ships named New York =

Many ships have been named New York, including:

== Merchant ships ==
- New York (1836 steamboat), a 524-gross-register-ton Long Island Sound steamboat operating between New York and New Haven, Connecticut; later went to the Hudson River as a towboat, abandoned 1875.
- New York (1837 steamboat), in packet service between New York City and Charleston, South Carolina; later in the Gulf of Mexico, destroyed by a hurricane in 1846
- SS New York (1854), a transatlantic passenger liner of Glasgow & New York Steamship Company, wrecked in Scotland in 1858
- SS Newyork (1858), a transatlantic passenger liner of North German Lloyd; converted in 1875 to ship-rigged sailing vessel New York, and wrecked in 1891
- SS New York (1887), an excursion steamer of Hudson River Line, destroyed by fire in 1908
- SS New York (1888), named City of New York until 1893; later served in U.S. Navy as USS Harvard in the Spanish–American War, and as USS Plattsburg in World War I
- SS New York (1889), a passenger ferry of the New York, Philadelphia and Norfolk Railroad destroyed by fire in 1932
- SS New York (1897), a seagoing tugboat 1941–1952, built as Catawissa for the Philadelphia and Reading Railroad and scrapped in 2008
- SS New York (1897 pilot cutter), built for the Sandy Hook Pilots, later commissioned as USS Esselen (AT-147)
- SS New York (1916), oil tanker, owned by Texaco until broken up in 1950.
- SS New York (1919), former name of Pan Kraft, an American cargo ship bombed and sunk by Germany in 1942
- SS New York (1921), later name of 16,991 GRT transatlantic liner Tuscania
- SS New York (1924), a passenger liner of Eastern Steamship Lines, sunk by the German submarine U-96 in 1942
- SS New York (1927), a transatlantic liner of Hamburg America Line, heavily damaged in 1945
- MV New York (1972), 779 GRT, 159 ft (48 m) industrial vessel, USCG ID 539474, winter station pilot boat owned by United NY Sandy Hook Pilots Assoc.

== Naval ships ==
- USS New York (1776), a gundalow built on Lake Champlain in 1776 that participated in the Battle of Valcour Island.
- USS New York (1800), a 36-gun frigate commissioned in 1800 and burned by the British in 1814.
- USS New York (1820), a 74-gun ship of the line laid down in 1820 which never left the stocks and was burned in 1861.
- A Java-class frigate named Ontario laid down in 1863; renamed New York in 1869, and sold while still on the stocks, in 1888.
- USS New York (ACR-2), an armored cruiser commissioned in 1893, in action in the Spanish–American War, renamed to Saratoga in 1911, renamed Rochester in 1917, decommissioned in 1933, and scuttled in 1941.
- USS New York (BB-34), a battleship laid down in 1911, commissioned in 1914, in action in both World Wars. Decommissioned in 1946 was used in both aerial and submerged atomic bomb tests that year. Surviving both, she was towed back to Pearl Harbor as a target ship and sunk following a massive assault by ships and planes in 1948.
- USS New York City (SSN-696), a Los Angeles-class submarine launched in 1977 and retired in 1997.
- USS New York (LPD-21), an amphibious transport dock launched in 2007 and commissioned in November 2009.

== See also ==
- List of ships named City of New York
- List of ships named New York City
