= Donato da Formello =

Italian painter

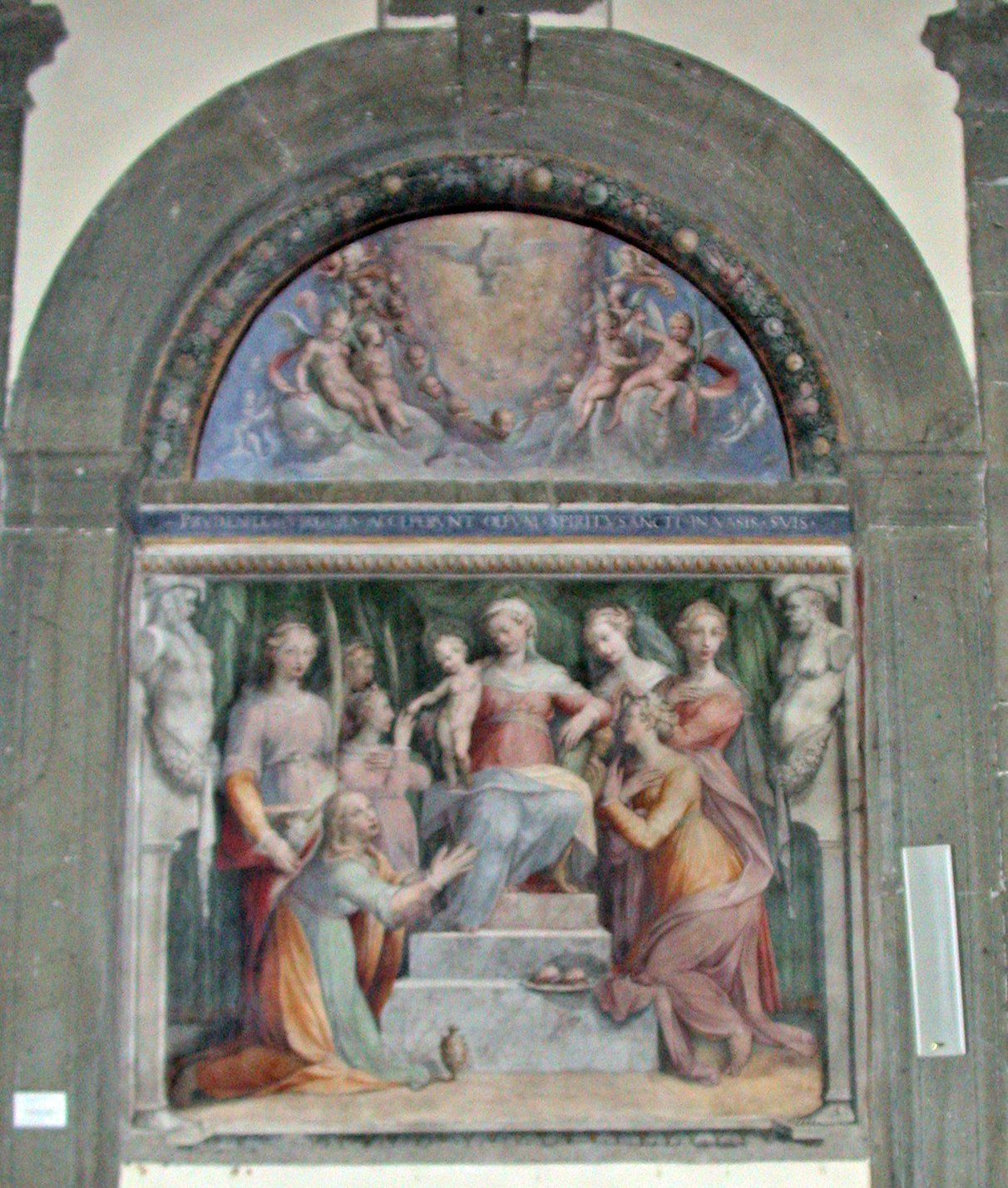
Fresco from the San Lorenzo in Formello, ca. 1570

Donato da Formello (c. 1550 – c. 1580), sometimes known as Donato Palmieri, was an Italian painter of the late Renaissance period. He was a native of Formello, in the duchy of Bracciano. He worked under Giorgio Vasari on projects in the Vatican and Florence. According to Baglione, he visited Rome early in the pontificate of Gregory XIII. He greatly surpassed the style of his instructor, as is evident in his fresco works on a staircase in the Vatican, representing subjects from the life of St. Peter. He died about 1580.
