= Kony =

Kony or KONY may refer to:

== Geography ==
- Kóny, a village in Győr-Moson-Sopron county, Hungary

== People ==
- Joseph Kony (born 1961), a Ugandan guerrilla leader
- Kony Ealy (born 1991), American football player

== Films ==
- Kony (film), an Indian Bengali-language film about the triumph of a swimmer and her coach
- Kony 2012, a film about Joseph Kony's war crimes

== Companies ==
- KONY (FM), a country music radio station in Cedar City, Utah
- Kony, Inc., a cloud-based mobile app provider in Austin, Texas

== Other ==
- Kony language, a dialect of the Sabaot language

== See also ==
- Koni (disambiguation)
- Coney (disambiguation)
