= Hykiem Coney =

American anti-gang activist

Hykiem Coney (May 16, 1982 – October 29, 2006) was an anti-gang activist with Help End Violence Now Coalition (HEVN), located in Nassau County, New York.

== Life ==
Coney was the founder of the "Outlaws", a Hempstead gang affiliated with The Bloods. He was sent to prison for gang-related activity, and upon his release intended to avenge the murder of a friend, before finding God and renouncing the gang lifestyle. In 2004, Coney began speaking out against violence with the Hempstead-based HEVN. Bishop J. Raymond Mackey of the Tabernacle of Joy Church was described by Coney as a father figure. Coney credited Mackey with turning his life around and helping him get a job with HEVN. Coney also became a minister-in-training.

Coney was fatally shot on October 21, 2006 by Tyrel Cason outside of Image Bar and Lounge on Hempstead Turnpike. He was placed on life support and declared brain dead. Life support was removed five days later and he died four days after that. Cason was convicted of second-degree manslaughter and on weapons charges on March 26, 2007. The jury did not convict Cason of second-degree murder. The defense argued that Cason had not aimed at Coney, and had not intended to hit anyone. Cason was sentenced to 20 to 30 years in prison.
