= Back to the Woods (album) =

Studio album by Angel Haze
- Released: September 14, 2015
- Recorded: 2015
- Genres: Alternative hip hop; alternative R&B
- Length: 50:08
- Producer: Tk Kayembe

Angel Haze chronology
| Dirty Gold (2013) | Back to the Woods (2015) |

Singles from Back to the Woods
- 1. "Impossible" Released: July 29, 2015; 2. "Babe Ruthless" Released: August 12, 2015; 3. "Moonrise Kingdom" Released: September 7, 2015

Professional ratings
Aggregate scores
| Source | Rating |
|---|---|
| Metacritic | 82/100 |
Review scores
| Source | Rating |
| Consequence of Sound | B+ |
| Gaffa | 5/6 stars |
| HipHopDX | 3.5/5 |
| The Irish Times | 3/5 stars |
| NME | 4/5 stars |
| The Observer | 4/5 stars |
| Tom Hull – on the Web | B+ |
| XXL | (XL) |

Back to the Woods is the second studio album by American rapper Angel Haze. It was released independently on September 14, 2015. The album was supported by three singles: "Impossible", "Babe Ruthless" and "Moonrise Kingdom".

== Critical reception ==
The album was praised by critics. It received an average score of 82 on Metacritic, which assigns a weighted mean rating out of 100 to reviews from mainstream critics, indicating "universal acclaim".

== Track listing ==
All tracks are written by Angel Haze.

| No. | Title | Length |
|---|---|---|
| 1. | "D-Day" | 1:36 |
| 2. | "Impossible" | 2:59 |
| 3. | "On Fire" | 2:46 |
| 4. | "The Wolves" | 3:40 |
| 5. | "Moonrise Kingdom" | 4:27 |
| 6. | "Detox" | 5:36 |
| 7. | "Dark Places" | 4:35 |
| 8. | "The Eulogy" | 3:44 |
| 9. | "Gods" | 3:48 |
| 10. | "Babe Ruthless" | 3:19 |
| 11. | "Bruises" | 4:09 |
| 12. | "Exposed" | 4:24 |
| 13. | "The Woods" | 4:56 |
| Total length: | | 50:08 |
