= List of ships named New York City =

Several ships have been named New York City, including:

- USS New York City, a Los Angeles-class submarine

Five ships operated by Bristol City Line:

- SS New York City (1879), sold in 1885 to the New York City Steamship Co, London
- SS New York City (1907), sunk by U-24 on 19 August 1915.
- SS New York City (1917), sold to Turkey in 1950.
- SS New York City (1943), ex Empire Camp and Valacia. Purchased in 1951 and sold to Glasgow United Shipping Co Ltd in 1955.
- SS New York City (1955), sold to Leopard Shipping Co in 1968.

== See also ==
- List of ships named City of New York
- List of ships named New York
