= William Cony =

British Royal Navy captain

Captain William Cony
- Died: 1707
- Occupation: Royal Navy captain

William Cony (died 1707) was a British Royal Navy captain.

== Biography ==
Cony attained the rank of captain on 1 April 1704, when he was appointed to command the Sorlings frigate. In September 1705 he was sent, in company with Captains Foljambe, of the Pendennis, and Martin, of the Blackwall, to convoy the trade to the Baltic. On the return voyage they fell in on 20 October with a squadron of five French ships, four of them of fifty guns, commanded by the Chevalier de Saint-Pol, and having five privateers in company. The privateers captured the merchant ships, thus permitting the ships of war to devote themselves to the three ships of the escort. After a stubborn fight they took them all three, Foljambe and Martin being slain and Cony dangerously wounded. On the part of the French, De Cayeux, one of the captains, lost an arm, and Saint-Pol was killed—a loss which, in the opinion of the French, was poorly compensated for by the successful issue of the combat (Guérin, Histoire Maritime, ii. 242). ‘I would,’ the French king is reported to have said, ‘that the English ships were safe at home if I had but Saint-Pol back again.’ Cony, while still a prisoner in France, was tried by court-martial for the loss of his ship, and very honourably acquitted on 20 January 1705–6; and the court further reporting that he had particularly distinguished himself in the action, and had received several dangerous wounds, recommended him to his royal highness's favour. He was accordingly shortly afterwards appointed to the Romney of 50 guns, and commanded her in the Mediterranean under the orders of Sir Cloudesley Shovell. He seems to have been successfully engaged in cruising against the enemy's privateers in the Straits, and was returning home the following year, when, in company with the Association, the Romney and all in her were lost among the Scilly Islands on 22 October 1707.
