= Battle Cry (Angel Haze song) =

Single by Angel Haze featuring Sia

from the album Dirty Gold
- Released: January 9, 2014
- Recorded: 2013
- Studio: Echo (Los Angeles, CA)
- Genre: Hip hop
- Length: 4:52
- Label: Island; Republic
- Songwriters: Angel Haze; Sia Furler; Greg Kurstin
- Producer: Greg Kurstin

Angel Haze singles chronology
"Echelon (It's My Way)" (2013)	"Battle Cry" (2014)	"Impossible" (2015)

Sia singles chronology
"Dim the Lights" (2013)	"Battle Cry" (2014)	"Chandelier" (2014)

Music video
- "Battle Cry" on YouTube

"Battle Cry" is a song recorded by American rapper Angel Haze featuring Australian singer-songwriter Sia. It was released as the second single from Haze's debut album, Dirty Gold, on January 9, 2014. The song was produced by Greg Kurstin. A remix featuring English rapper Lost Souljah was released on May 2, 2014.

== Music video ==
An official music video for the song, directed by Frank Borin, was released on Haze's official Vevo account on February 14, 2014. The music video was nominated for Best Video with a Social Message at the 2014 MTV Video Music Awards.

== Credits and personnel ==
Credits adapted from Tidal.

- Angel Haze – writer, vocals
- Sia Furler – writer, vocals
- Greg Kurstin – writer, producer, bass guitar, drums, guitar, keyboards, piano, recording engineer
- Jesse Shatkin – recording engineer
- Alex Pasco – recording engineer
- Manny Marroquin – mixer
- Chris Gehringer – mastering engineer

== Track listing ==
UK Digital download

1. "Battle Cry" (Remix) [feat. Sia & Lost Souljah] – 4:52

Remixes EP

1. "Battle Cry" (MK Remix) – 8:25
2. "Battle Cry" (Levi Lennox Remix) – 4:07
3. "Battle Cry" (Yumi And the Weather Remix) – 4:26
4. "Battle Cry" (Kudu Blue Remix) – 4:18

== Charts ==
Chart (2014)	Peak position
Belgium (Ultratip Bubbling Under Flanders)	79
UK Singles (Official Charts)	70
UK Hip Hop/R&B (Official Charts)	12

== Release history ==
Region	Date	Format	Version	Label	Ref.
United Kingdom	1 January 2014	Digital download and streaming	Remix with Lost Souljah	Island; Republic	
United Kingdom	29 January 2014	Digital download and streaming	Remixes EP	Island; Republic	
