= New York (Angel Haze song) =

Single by Angel Haze

from the album Reservation
- Released: October 8, 2012
- Recorded: 2012
- Genre: Hip hop
- Length: 3:27
- Label: Island; Republic
- Songwriters: Angel Haze; William "The 83rd" McNair
- Producer: William "The 83rd" McNair

Angel Haze singles chronology
"New York" (2012)	"Echelon (It's My Way)" (2013)

"New York" is the debut single by American rapper Angel Haze, released on October 8, 2012. The song was featured as a single from their third mixtape Reservation and later appeared on their debut extended play New York as well as the deluxe edition of their debut studio album Dirty Gold. Produced by The 83rd, the track samples a clapping loop from Gil Scott-Heron’s track “New York Is Killing Me”. The official music video for the song was directed by Adrienne Nicole.

== Charts ==
Chart (2012)	Peak position
UK Singles (OCC)	58
UK Hip Hop/R&B (OCC)	12
