= Dirty Gold =

Studio album by Angel Haze
- Released: December 30, 2013
- Recorded: January–June 2013
- Genres: Hip hop, R&B
- Length: 53:15
- Labels: Island; Republic
- Producers: Markus Dravs; A Tribe Called Red; Mike Dean; Greg Kurstin; Malay; Jake Gosling; Rudimental; The 83rd

Angel Haze chronology
New York EP (2012)	Dirty Gold (2013)	Back to the Woods (2015)

Singles from Dirty Gold
- 1. "Echelon (It's My Way)" Released: October 15, 2013; 2. "Battle Cry" Released: January 9, 2014

Dirty Gold is the debut studio album by American rapper Angel Haze. It was released on December 30, 2013, by Island Records and Republic Records. The 12-song effort features production from Markus Dravs, Mike Dean, Greg Kurstin, Malay, Rudimental and the Halluci Nation, and a track written by Australian singer-songwriter Sia. The album was supported by two singles: "Echelon (It's My Way)" and "Battle Cry" featuring Sia; along with the promotional single, "No Bueno".

== Background ==
In July 2012, Angel Haze released her EP Reservation for free online. It was met with critical acclaim, receiving an 88/100 score at Metacritic. On the same year, she took part in the BET Hip Hop Awards' Cypher. She was also featured on Funk Volume artist Dizzy Wright's mixtape Free SmokeOut Conversations, on the remixed track for "Can't Trust Em". On her 2012 mixtape Classick, Haze recorded a cover of Eminem’s 2002 song, "Cleanin' Out My Closet". Earbuddy's John Downey wrote, "Haze’s take on Slim Shady’s classic tune might be the superior product."

== Release and promotion ==
In May 2013, Haze debuted a track that was not included on Dirty Gold, titled "No Bueno", at a performance in London. On June 2, 2013, the song was released as the first promotional single. On December 18, 2013, Haze leaked the album in its entirety on their SoundCloud page. The leak happened following a dispute with their record label which Haze wrote about in a series of tweets expressing their outrage. Executives for the record company told Haze that if they finished recording their album before the summer, the label would release Dirty Gold in 2013. It was scheduled for a January 2014 release, but was later pushed back to March 3, 2014.

Hours after they leaked the album without the approval of the label, who had allegedly taken it down soon after the songs had spread across the Internet, Haze stated on Twitter that after talking with the executives, both parties agreed to release Dirty Gold on December 30, 2013 in the United States and the United Kingdom. The album debuted on the UK Albums Chart (5 January 2014) at number 196. The record company also confirmed it was starting work towards a physical release of the album, which was scheduled for release in early in 2014 as it could not be manufactured by the end of December 2013.

=== Singles ===
On August 27, 2013, the album's lead single, titled "Echelon (It's My Way)", premiered on Zane Lowe's BBC Radio 1 show. On October 2, 2013, its music video premiered on Angel Haze's VEVO. The Markus Dravs-produced song was made available for purchase on October 15, 2013.

On January 9, 2014, "Battle Cry" featuring Sia, was serviced to urban contemporary radio in the United Kingdom as the album's second single.

== Critical reception ==
Professional ratings
Aggregate scores
Source	Rating
Metacritic	66/100
Review scores
Source	Rating
The A.V. Club	C
Clash	6/10
Consequence of Sound	C+
The Guardian	4/5 stars
Now	2/5 stars
Pitchfork Media	5.9/10
Spin	5/10
Tiny Mix Tapes	4.5/5 stars
XXL	(M)

Dirty Gold received mixed reviews from music critics. At Metacritic, assigns a normalized rating out of 100 to reviews from mainstream critics, the album received a 66 score based on 19 reviews. Rowan Savage of Tiny Mix Tapes gave the album four and a half stars out of five, saying "Dirty Gold feels like a statement, an arrival." In a mixed review, Spin gave the album a five out of ten, saying "Haze's attempt to appear undefinable and resist categorization (as Dirty Gold's conversational interludes attest) is a laudable pursuit, but it leaves the record unfocused." In a more negative review, Kevin Ritchie of Now gave the album two out of five stars, saying "Haze is positioning herself as a top 40 infiltrator, which is fine, but she’s also diluted her uniqueness." Alexis Petridis of The Guardian gave the album four out of five stars, saying "It's a flawed debut, but it's also a brave and individual one: its best bits are flatly great, its attempt to harness pop-rap to serious topics is a pretty intrepid move."

Evan Rytlewski of The A.V. Club gave the album a C, saying "A labored crossover grab that mistakes conviction for substance, Dirty Gold marks Haze as just the latest in a long line of promising mixtape rappers to whiff a major-label debut." Eric Diep of XXL gave the album an M, saying "But Dirty Gold's shortcomings overshadow the shining moments on the album as Haze struggles to find her identity, somewhere between underground rebel and mainstream player."

Mike Madden of Consequence of Sound gave the album a C+, saying "Dirty Gold is plenty inviting, sonically speaking, with patches of rock, EDM, and pop. It's problematic, however, that the album zones in on those genres with about as much specificity as those designators have."

== Commercial performance ==
In the United States, the album debuted at number 15 on the Billboard Heatseekers Albums chart in its first week of release, failing to appear on the Billboard 200. It sold fewer than 1,000 copies in the United States in its first week. In the UK, it debuted at number 196 on the UK Album Charts, selling 857 copies. The album debuted at number 22 on the UK R&B Albums.

== Track listing ==
Standard edition
No.	Title	Writer(s)	Producer(s)	Length
1.	"Sing About Me"	Angel Haze; Markus Dravs; Frankie Storm; Rachel Taylor	Dravs	3:35
2.	"Echelon (It's My Way)"	Haze; Dravs	Dravs	3:34
3.	"A Tribe Called Red"	Haze; Dravs; Dan General; Ian Campeau; Ehren Thomas	A Tribe Called Red	4:37
4.	"Deep Sea Diver"	Haze; Dravs	Dravs	4:48
5.	"Black Synagogue"	Haze; Wynter Gordon; Mike Dean	Dean	6:49
6.	"Angels & Airwaves"	Haze; James Ho	Malay	4:21
7.	"April's Fool"	Haze; Ho	Malay	3:20
8.	"White Lilies / White Lies"	Haze; Dravs; Tshiswaka Kayembe; Petro Prokopiw	Dravs	5:18
9.	"Battle Cry" (featuring Sia)	Haze; Sia Furler; Greg Kurstin	Kurstin	4:52
10.	"Black Dahlia"	Haze; Dravs; James Wallace	Dravs	5:29
11.	"Planes Fly"	Haze; Chris Leonard; Jake Gosling; Natalia Kills	Gosling	4:27
12.	"Dirty Gold"	Haze; Kurstin	Kurstin	4:45

Deluxe edition
No.	Title	Writer(s)	Producer(s)	Length
13.	"Rose-Tinted Suicide"	Haze; Isabella Summers	Summers	2:14
14.	"Vinyl"	Haze; Ho	Malay	3:46
15.	"Crown"	Haze; Amir "Amir Amor" Izadkhah	Rudimental	3:07
16.	"New York"	Gil Scott-Heron; Haze; William "The 83rd" McNair	The 83rd	3:27

Notes

- "Black Synagogue" features uncredited vocals from Wynter Gordon.
- "Black Dahlia" features an uncredited speech from Natalia Kills.

== Charts ==
Chart (2014)	Peak position
US Heatseekers Albums	15
UK Albums	196
UK R&B Albums	22

== Release history ==
Region	Date	Format(s)	Label	Ref.
Europe	December 27, 2013	Digital download	Island Records	
North America	December 30, 2013	Digital download	Republic Records	
United Kingdom	January 27, 2014	CD	Island Records	
