= Formello =

- Comune
- Comune di Formello
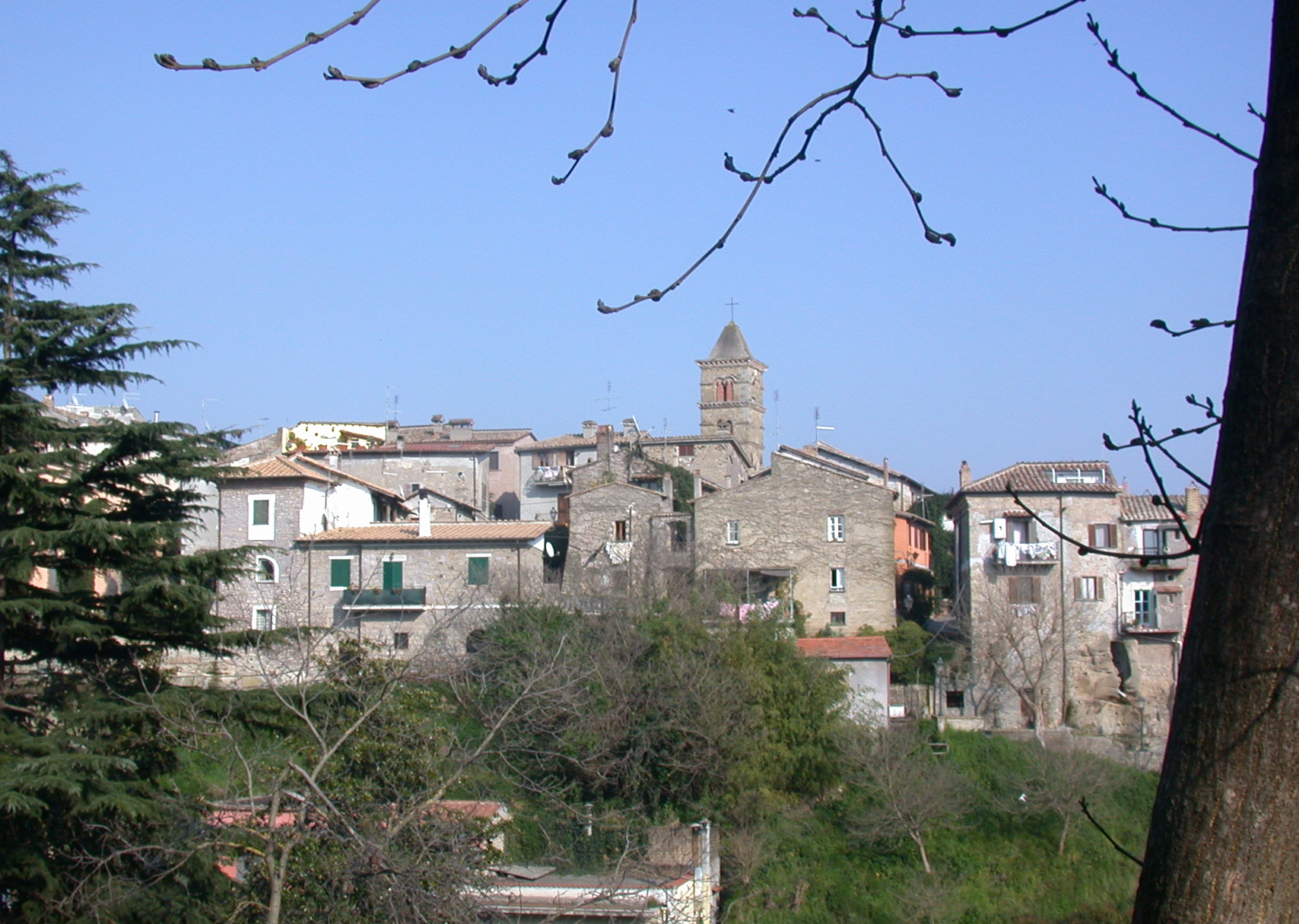
- View of Formello

- Coat of arms

- Location within Italy Location within Lazio
- Coordinates: 42°5′N 12°24′E
- Country: Italy
- Region: Lazio
- Metropolitan city: Rome (RM)
- Frazioni: Le Rughe

Government
  - Mayor: Gian Filippo Santi

Area
  - Total: 31.15 km^{2} (12.03 sq mi)
- Elevation: 243 m (797 ft)

Population (31 October 2017)
  - Total: 13,113
  - Density: 421.0/km^{2} (1,090/sq mi)
- Demonym: Formellesi
- Time zone: UTC+1 (CET)
  - Summer (DST): UTC+2 (CEST)
- Postal code: 00060
- Dialing code: 06
- Patron saint: Saint Lawrence
- Saint day: August 10
- Website: Official website

Formello is a comune (municipality) in the Metropolitan City of Rome Capital. It is located southwest of the Monti Sabatini, within the Regional Park of Veii. The communal territory sits on large deposits of tuff, which is intensively mined in the area.

== History ==
The area has been settled since prehistoric times. As an Italian comune, it includes some of the archaeological sites associated with the powerful former Etruscan city of Veii, which rivaled Rome for a time, north of the village of Isola Farnese, south of Formello. Settlement in the region declined after Veii's destruction in 396 BC.

In this area, about 780 AD, with peaceful conditions reestablished, Pope Adrian I assembled a great estate of which this territory formed part, his Domusculta Capracorum, in contrast with the power of the Abbey of Farfa, but it was destroyed by Saracen attacks in the ninth century. The domus' territories included a fundus Formellum, where a settlement developed that was first mentioned in 1027.

In the 11th century it was a possession of the Roman Basilica of San Paolo fuori le Mura, and was probably fortified in the same period. In 1279 it became a fief of the Orsini family, who sold it to the Chigi in 1661.

== Main sights ==
- Church of San Lorenzo, also known as Chiesa di San Lorenzo Martire (10th-11th centuries). It received a bell tower in the fifteenth century, and was renovated in 1574 with the addition of the two aisles. The left one houses frescoes by Donato Palmieri. This is located adjacent to Palazzo Chigi.
- Palazzo Chigi (c. 11th century). It was built by the Orsini, probably over the pre-existing castrum mentioned in the 11th century. It houses the Archaeological Museum of the Countryside of Veii.
- Church of San Michele Arcangelo, also known as Chiesa San Michele Arcangelo (c. 12th century). Romanesque church with a high bell tower and a single nave. This church is only open for special occasions.
- The ruins of Villa Chigi-Versaglia, built by cardinal Flavio Chigi in the 17th century.

== Sport ==
Formello is home to the training grounds and base of Italian Serie A side S.S. Lazio: (Centro sportivo di Formello)

== Photo gallery ==
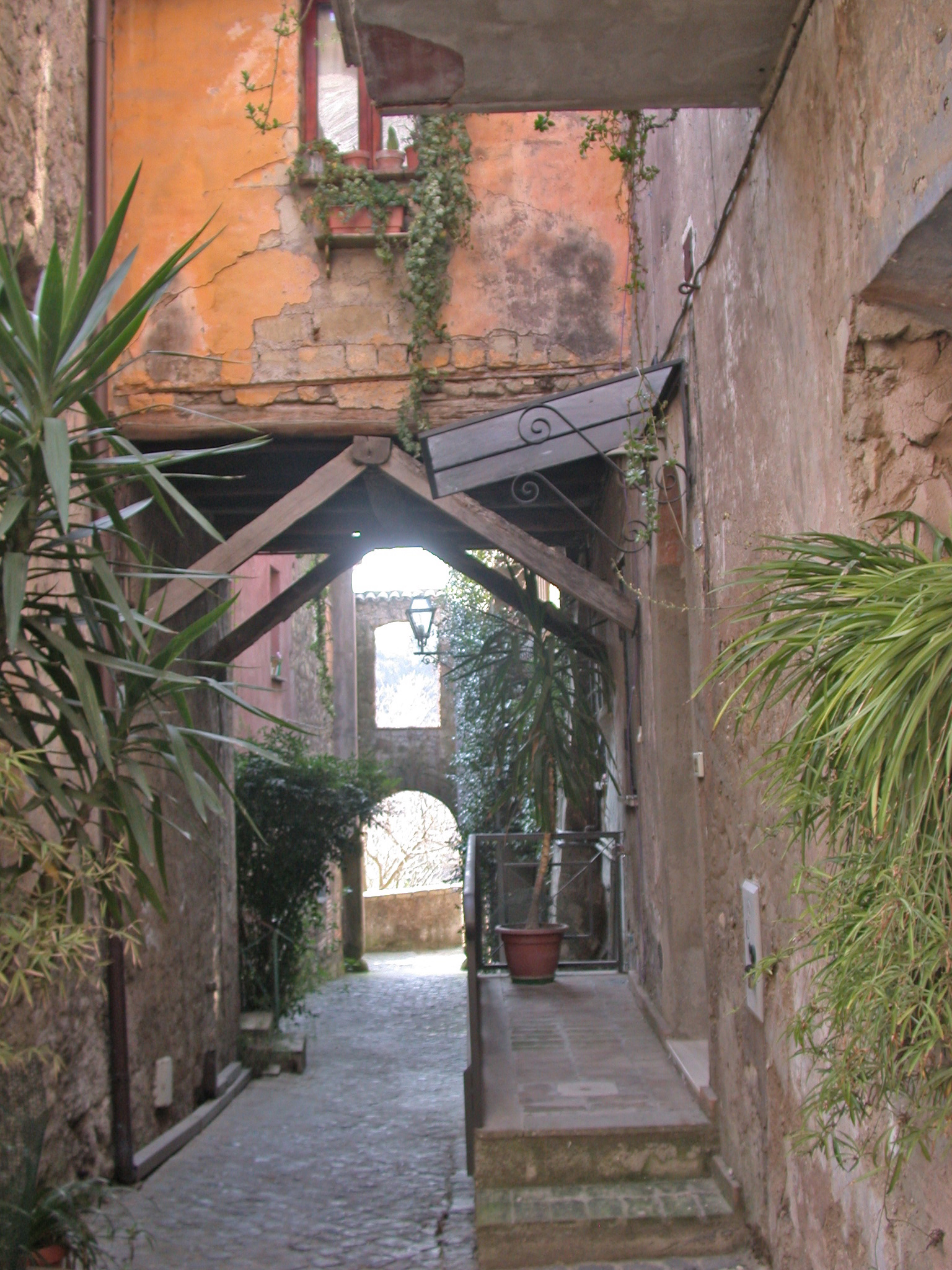
Formello Storic Center

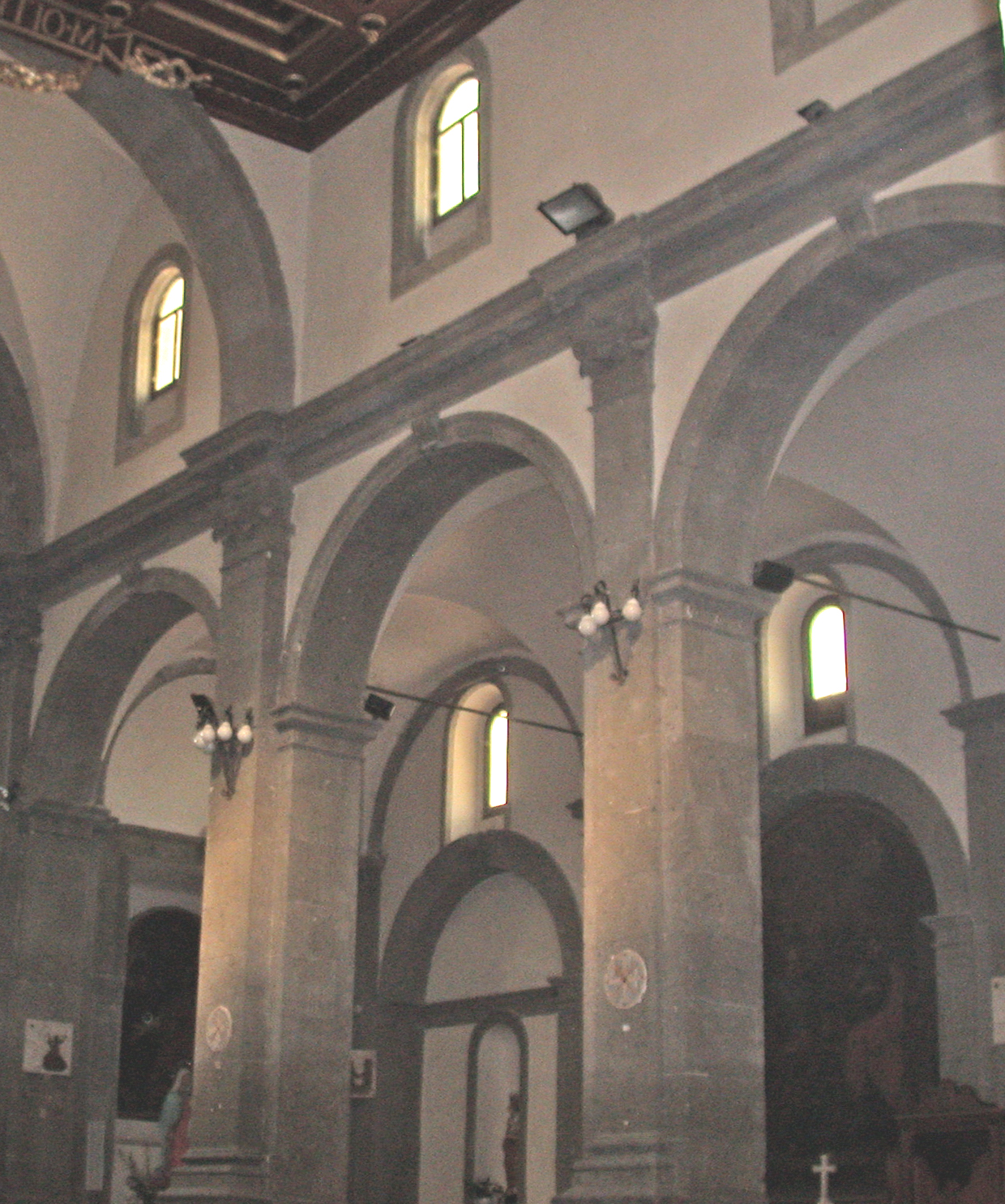
San Lorenzo Church (internal)

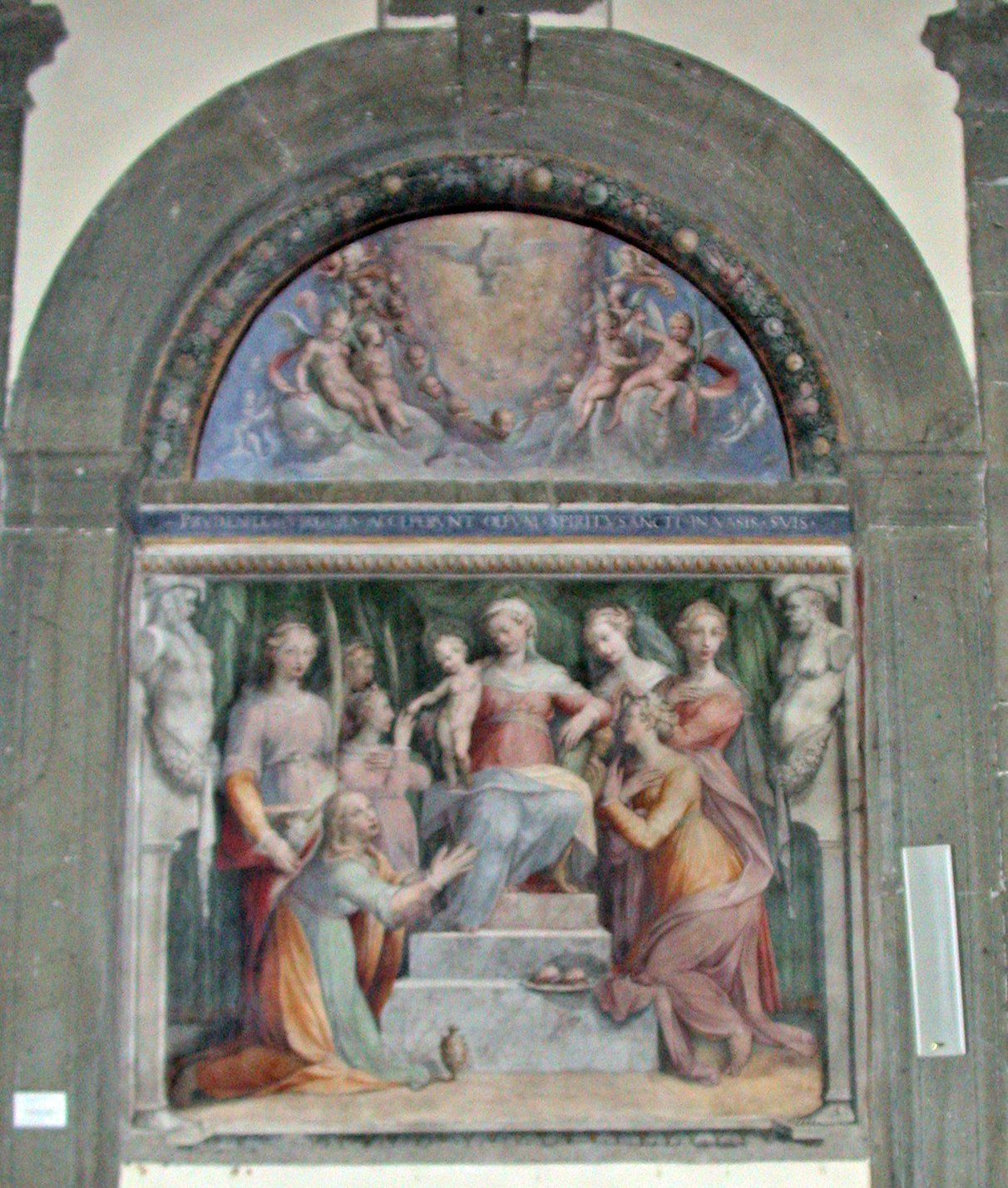
Painting by Domenico Palmieri (1570 approx.)

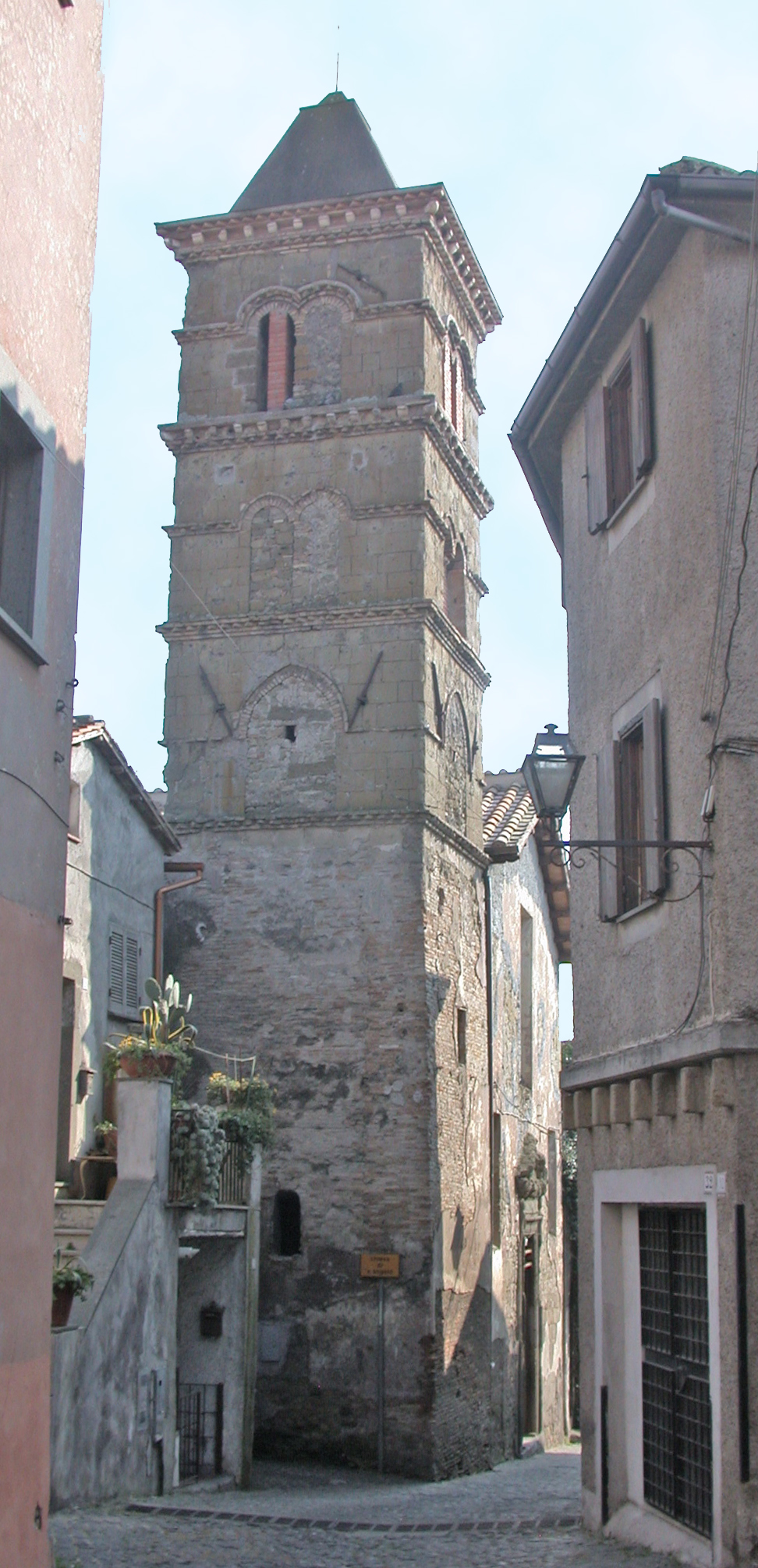
San Michele Arcangelo Church

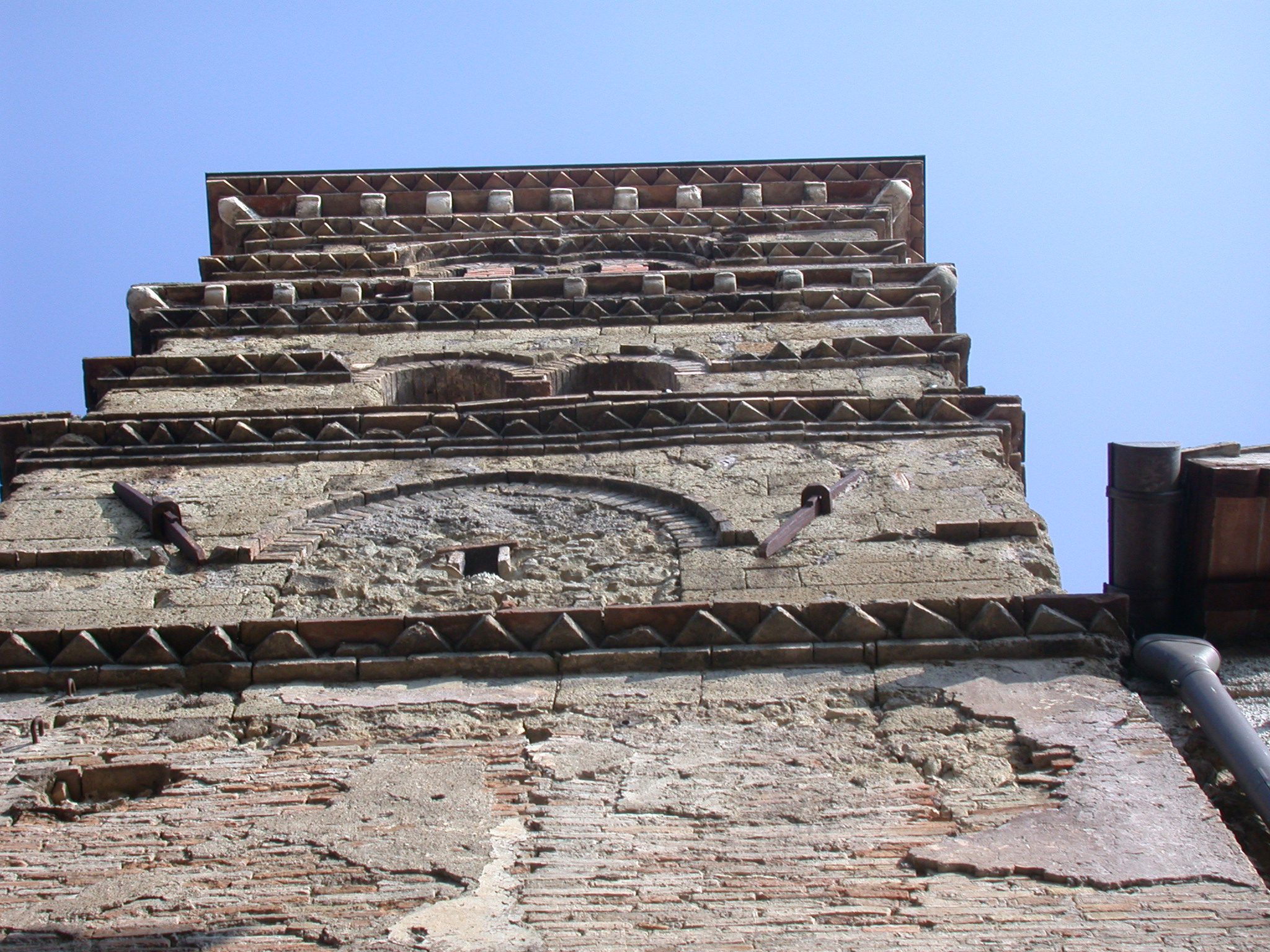
San Michele Arcangelo Church

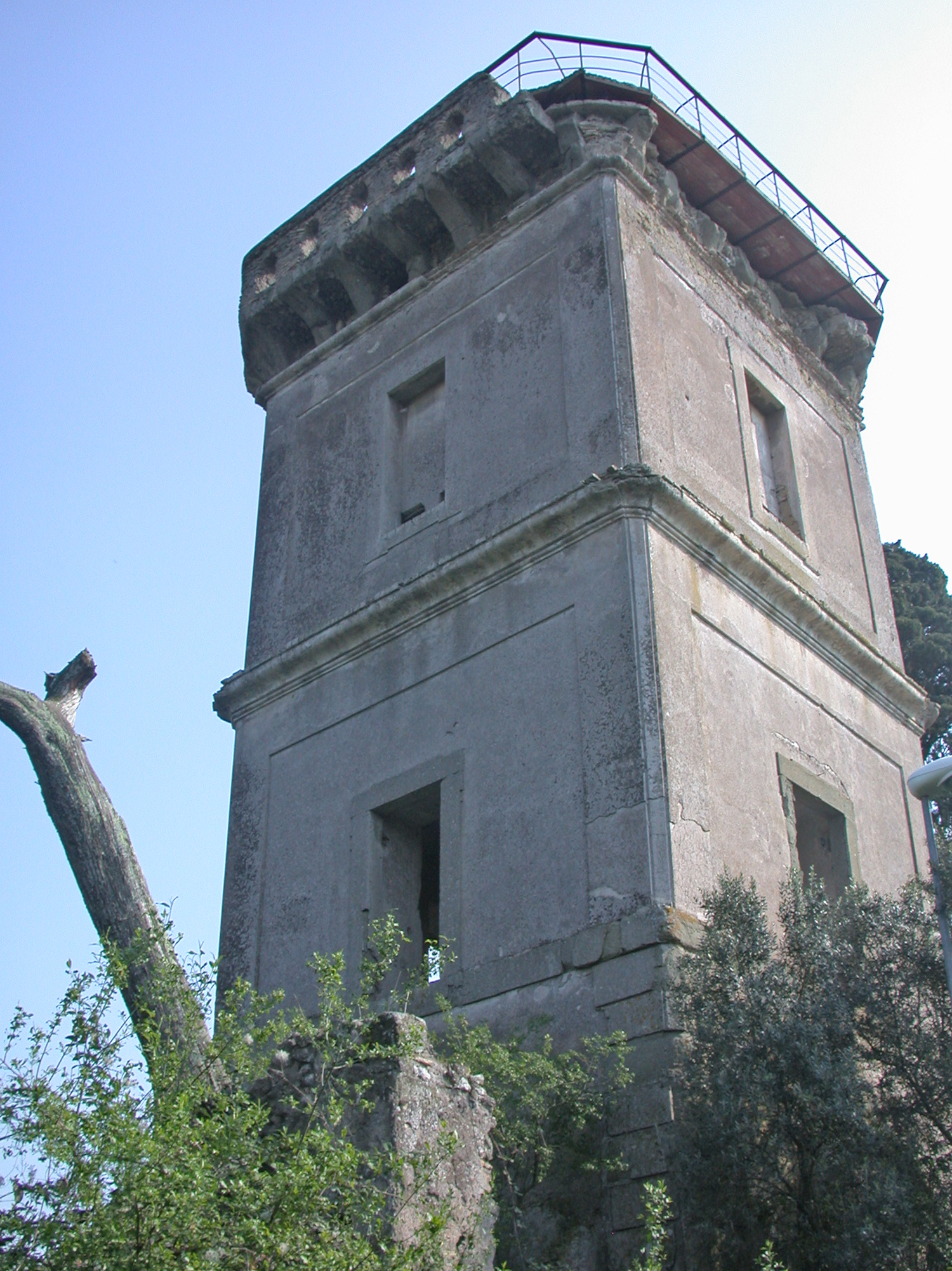
"Torre Colombaia", remaining building of villa Chigi-Versaglia

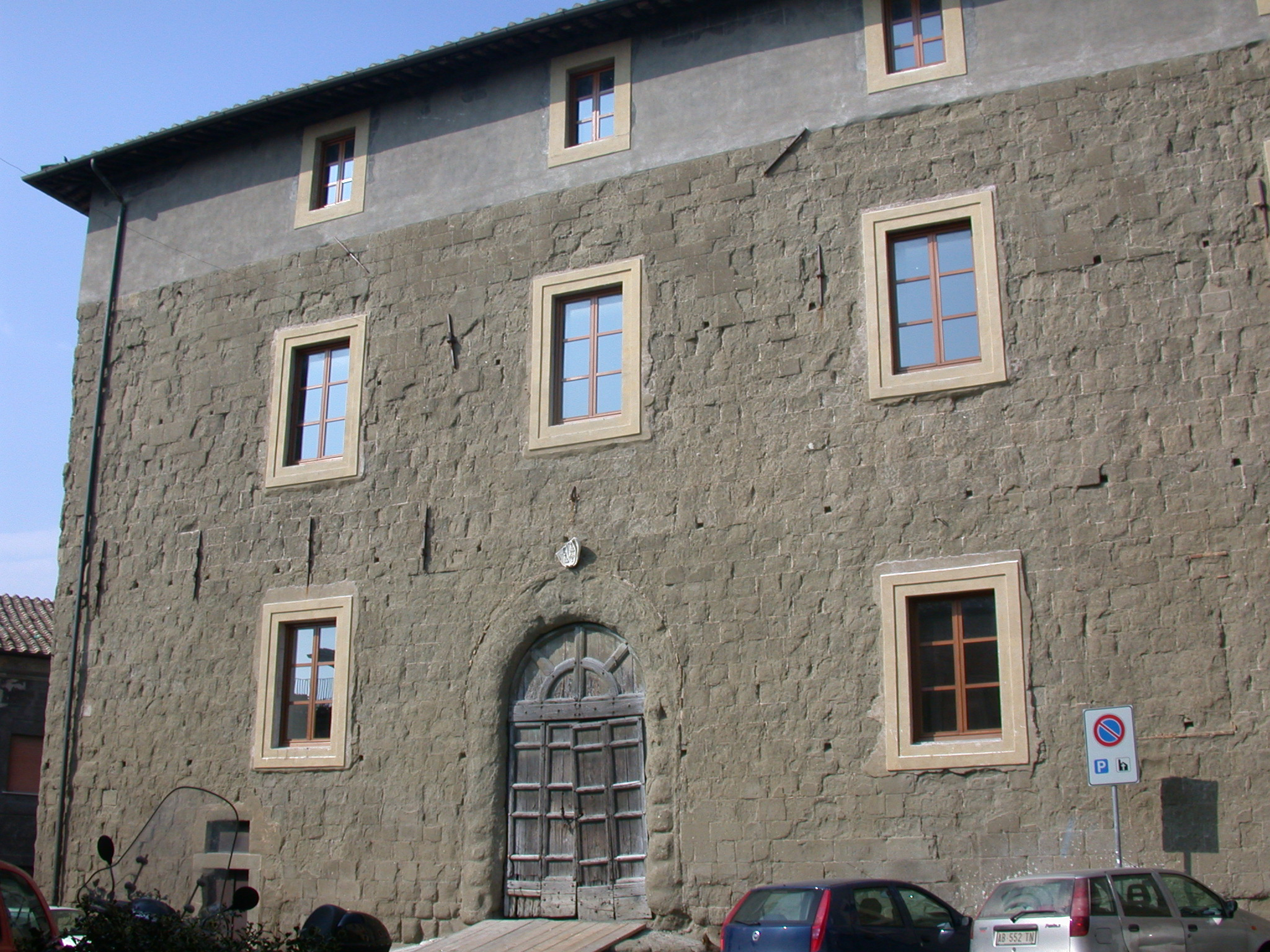
Façade of Palazzo Chigi.
