= Temenos AG =

Swiss banking software company

- Company type: Public (Aktiengesellschaft)
- Traded as: SIX: TEMN; SMI MID component
- Industry: Banking software; Computer software; Digital banking
- Founded: Geneva, Switzerland (1993, as Temenos Systems)
- Founders: George Koukis; Kim Goodall
- Headquarters: Geneva, Switzerland
- Key people: Thibault de Tersant, chairman; Takis Spiliopoulos, CEO; Barb Morgan, Chief Product and Technology Officer
- Products: Temenos Digital - Digital Origination and Digital Channels; Temenos Transact - Core Banking; Temenos Payments; Temenos Fund Administration; Temenos SaaS
- Revenue: ▲$1.04 billion (2024)
- Number of employees: 7,500 (2020)
- Website: www.temenos.com

Temenos AG is a Swiss technology company specialising in enterprise software for banks and financial services, with its headquarters in Geneva. It was founded in 1993, and has been listed on the Swiss stock exchange since 2001.

Temenos serves over 3,000 financial institutions in 145 countries across the world. It claims to be used by 41 of the top 50 banks worldwide.

== History ==
Temenos was established in November 1993 by George Koukis and Kim Goodall, having acquired the rights to GLOBUS, the successful banking software platform developed by a team of technical and banking experts in 1988. The company was renamed to Temenos, in reference to a lecture on money given by Hans-Wolfgang Frick at the Temenos Academy (1992), and continued to develop and market GLOBUS.

In 2001, Temenos went public, and is listed on the main segment of the SWX Swiss Exchange (TEMN). Also in 2001, Temenos acquired a mainframe core banking application aimed at high-end retail banks, originally developed by IBM, and now marketed as Temenos Corebanking.

On 30 September 2003, Temenos launched its T24 banking package. T24 was based on GLOBUS, but with a state-of-the-art banking technology platform. This was the result of 3 years of development effort and an investment of more than US$24 million.

In 2011, George Koukis stepped down as chairman and became a non-executive director, and Andreas Andreades became chairman.

In 2021, Temenos launched a new collaborative fintech marketplace, Temenos Exchange.

In February 2024, American short-selling firm Hindenburg Research released a report alleging "major accounting irregularities" at Temenos. Temenos denied the allegations, and announced an independent review. The independent review was published in April 2024, claiming that the allegations made by Hindenburg Research were "inaccurate and misleading." In response, Hindenburg asserted that the independent review was a "tacit confirmation of accounting manipulation and disclosure violations," and questioned the "independence" of the review.

In February 2025, Temenos announced the sale of its Multifonds business to Montagu Private Equity for approximately US$400 million, as part of a strategic shift to refocus on core and digital banking platforms.

=== Acquisitions ===
Companies acquired by Temenos, listed by year
Year	Company	Country
2007	Actis.bsp	Germany
2008	Financial Objects Ltd	United Kingdom
2008	Lydian Associates Ltd	United Kingdom
2009	Viveo	France
2010	FE Mobile	United Kingdom
2010	Odyssey Financial Technologies	Luxembourg
2011	Primisyn	Canada
2012	Edge IPK	United Kingdom
2013	Trinovus	United States
2015	Akcelerant	United States
2015	Multifonds	Luxembourg
2017	Rubik Financial Limited ('Rubik')	Australia
2018	Avoka	United States
2019	Htrunk Software Solutions	India
2019	Logical Glue	United Kingdom
2019	Kony, Inc	United States / India
