= New York, Missouri =

Extinct hamlet in Missouri, U.S.

Coordinates: 37°10′00″N 89°26′41″W

New York is a ghost town in Scott County, in the U.S. state of Missouri.

The first settlement at New York was made in the 1840s by a colony of Germans who immigrated via New York City, hence the name.
