= Thomas E. Hogan =

Thomas Hogan
- Born: Thomas E. Hogan; Chicago, Illinois, USA
- Occupation: Chairman and CEO

Tom Hogan is currently the Executive Chairman of the Board of Cellebrite (NASDAQ:CLBT). Tom is also a current member of the OneMeta board of directors. Prior to his Cellebrite assignment, he served as an Operating Managing Director at Vista Equity Partners from January 2021 to February, 2023. While at Vista Hogan served on the private boards of Pluralsight, Infoblox, Drift, and Gainsight. Hogan also served as a public company board director at Citrix, Vignette, Inforte, and Vastera.

Prior to joining Vista in January 2021, Tom was the Chairman and CEO of Kony, Inc. from 2014 to its acquisition in the fall of 2019 by Swiss-based Temenos. Hogan assisted with the integration and transition of Kony for three months and exited in February, 2020. Prior to his Kony assignment, Hogan was the executive vice president of Sales and Marketing for HP's $57B Enterprise Business in 2010 after serving as the head of HP's Software business from 2006 - 2009. While EVP of HP's Software business, Hogan led several acquisitions including the acquisition of Mercury Interactive and Opsware.

Following his HP assignment, Tom served twelve months as the executive vice president and general manager of CSC. Prior to HP, Hogan served as president and CEO of Vignette (NASDAQ:VIGN) and SVP of Global Sales at Siebel Systems. Hogan began his career at IBM in 1982.

Tom Hogan holds a master's degree from Northwestern’s Kellogg School of Management with distinction and a BS in biomedical engineering from the University of Illinois.
