= USS Edgar F. Coney =

Armed tug in the United States Navy

Coordinates: 39.959°N 75.121°W

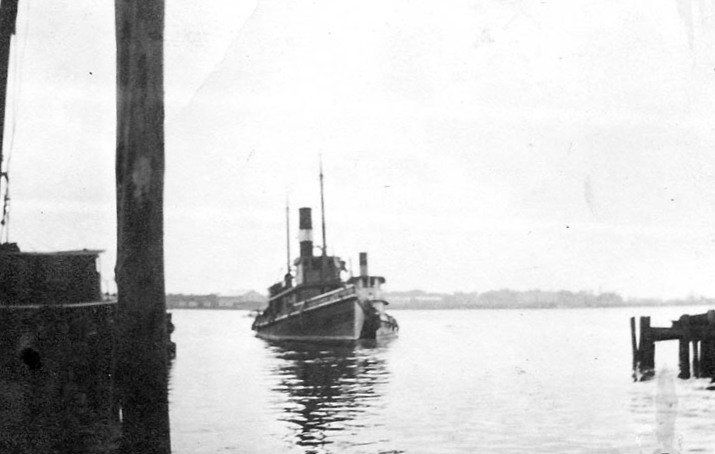
- Edgar F. Coney (left) in civilian use, tied up alongside a smaller tug (right) sometime between 1904 and 1917, prior to her U.S. Navy service as USS Edgar F. Coney.

History

United States
- Name: USS Edgar F. Coney
- Namesake: Previous name retained
- Builder: John B. Dialogue & Sons, Camden, New Jersey
- Completed: 1904
- Acquired: 22 September 1917
- Commissioned: 22 September 1917
- Decommissioned: 5 July 1919
- Fate: Returned to owner 5 July 1919; Sank off Florida 1930
- Notes: Operated as commercial tug Edgar F. Coney 1904-1917 and 1919-1930

General characteristics
- Type: Tug
- Tonnage: 153 gross register tons
- Length: 102 ft (31 m) (between perpendiculars)
- Beam: 21 ft (6.4 m)
- Draft: 14 ft (4.3 m)
- Propulsion: Steam engine, 1,000 indicated horsepower, one shaft
- Speed: 13 knots
- Complement: 26
- Armament: 1 × 1-pounder gun

USS Edgar F. Coney (SP-346) was an armed tug that served in the United States Navy from 1917 to 1919.

Edgar F. Coney was built as a commercial steam tug of the same name in 1904 by John B. Dialogue & Sons at Camden, New Jersey, for the South Atlantic Towboat Company. On 22 September 1917, the U.S. Navy chartered her from her owner – by then Philip Shore of Tampa, Florida – for use during World War I. She was commissioned the same day as USS Edgar F. Coney (SP-346).

Assigned to the 3rd Naval District, Edgar F. Coney was based at Tompkinsville, Staten Island, New York. She carried out towing duties in the New York City area for the remainder of World War I and into 1919.

Edgar F. Coney was decommissioned on 5 July 1919 and returned to her owner the same day. She returned to commercial service. The Tug sank 28 January 1930 in the Gulf of Mexico in rough seas and high winds 70 miles south east of Port Arthur, Texas. Lost with all 14 hands.
