= New York EP =

EP by Angel Haze
- Released: December 11, 2012
- Genre: Hip hop
- Length: 13:57
- Label: Republic Records

Angel Haze chronology
Classick (2012)	New York EP (2012)	Dirty Gold (2013)

New York EP is the debut extended play (EP) by American rapper Angel Haze released on December 11, 2012, by Republic Records featuring the single "New York". It charted at #58 on the UK Singles Chart.

The EP, released on Republic Records, was made available for digital download on October 5, 2012, in the UK and on December 11, 2012, in the United States and is composed of tracks from their previously released mixtapes.

== Track listing ==
Standard edition
No.	Title	Length
1.	"New York"	3:27
2.	"Werkin' Girls"	3:09
3.	"Supreme"	3:01
4.	"Chi (Need to Know)"	4:20

UK bonus tracks
No.	Title	Length
5.	"New York" (King Krule Rework)
6.	"New York" (Loadstar Remix)
