= USS New York City =

Los Angeles-class nuclear-powered attack submarine of the US Navy

USS New York City (SSN-696)
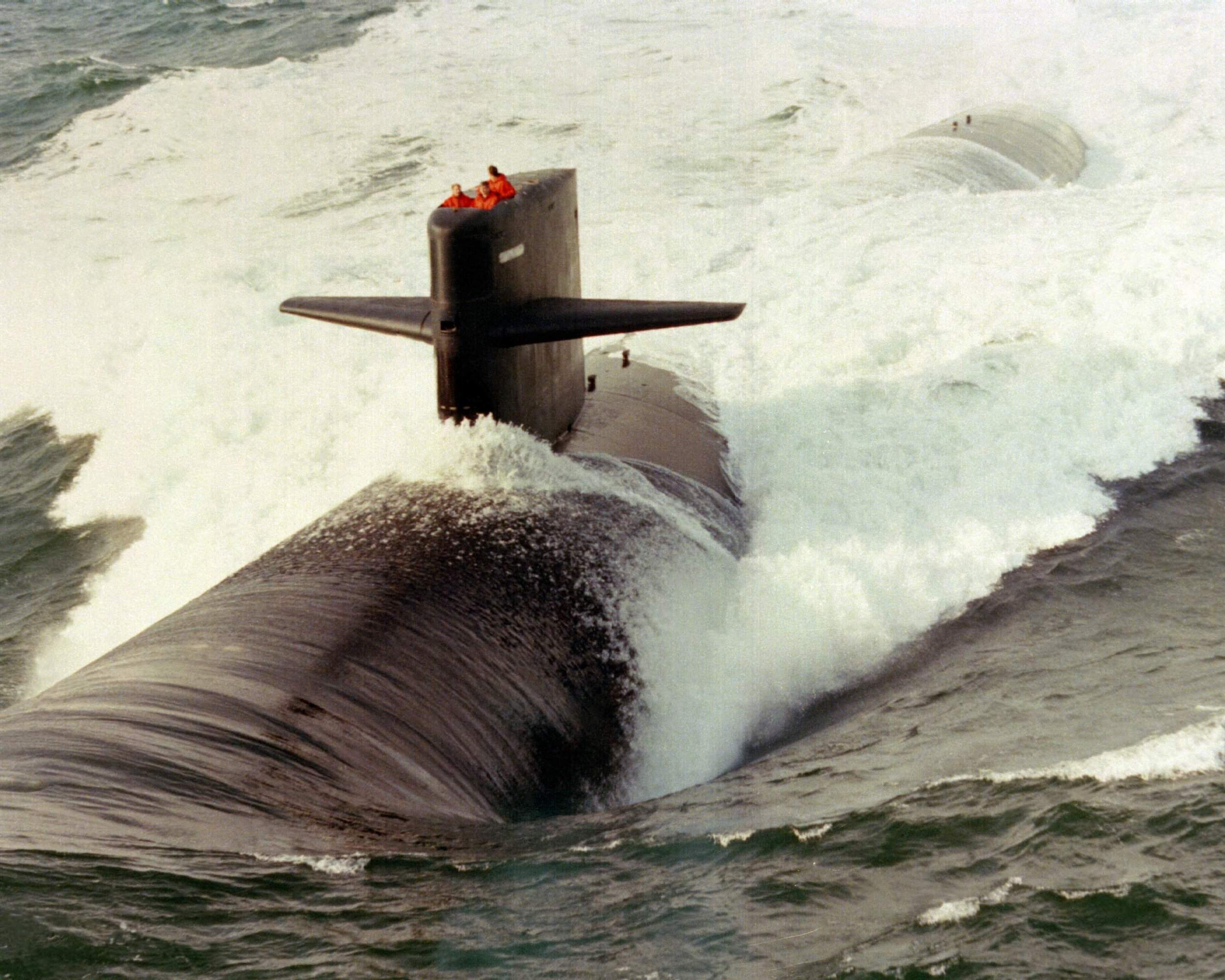

History

United States
- Name: USS New York City
- Namesake: City of New York
- Awarded: 24 January 1972
- Builder: General Dynamics Corporation
- Laid down: 15 December 1973
- Launched: 18 June 1977
- Commissioned: 3 March 1979
- Decommissioned: 30 April 1997
- Stricken: 30 April 1997
- Fate: To be disposed of by submarine recycling
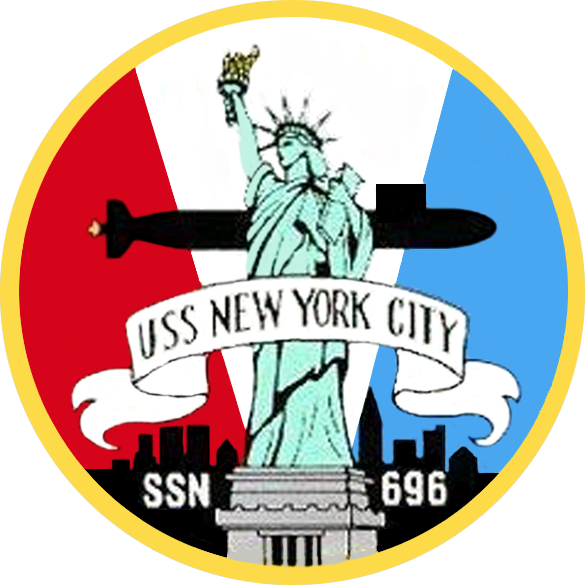
- Badge

General characteristics
- Class & type: Los Angeles-class submarine
- Displacement: 5,731 tons light; 6,111 tons full; 380 tons dead
- Length: 110.3 m (361 ft 11 in)
- Beam: 10 m (32 ft 10 in)
- Draft: 9.7 m (31 ft 10 in)
- Propulsion: S6G nuclear reactor, 2 turbines, 35,000 hp (26,000 kW), 1 auxiliary motor 325 hp (242 kW), 1 shaft
- Speed: 15 knots (28 km/h) surfaced; 32 knots (59 km/h) submerged
- Test depth: 290 m (950 ft)
- Complement: 12 officers, 98 men
- Armament: 4 × 21 inch (533 mm) torpedo tubes; UGM-84 Harpoon; Tomahawk missiles; Mark 48 torpedoes

USS New York City (SSN-696) was a Los Angeles-class submarine and the only vessel of the United States Navy to be named specifically for New York City (as distinct from the U.S. state).

== History ==
The contract to build New York City was awarded to the Electric Boat Division of General Dynamics Corporation in Groton, Connecticut on 24 January 1972 and her keel was laid down on 15 December 1973. She was launched on 18 June 1977 sponsored by Mrs. Rachel Line Schlesinger (née Mellinger), wife of former Secretary of Defence James R. Schlesinger, delivered to the Navy on 23 January 1979, and commissioned on 3 March 1979 with Commander James A. Ross in command.

New York City carried out four deployments to the western Pacific (WestPac) between 1981 and 1985, and participated in numerous fleet exercises during those periods. After undergoing a modernization overhaul at Pearl Harbor (December 1985 – February 1988), the boat deployed to the Northern Pacific (November–December 1988). She made a WestPac deployment in 1989, then a second Northern Pacific deployment in early 1990, and two WestPac deployments in 1991. New York City carried out eastern Pacific deployments in 1992 and 1993; and additional deployments to both the western and eastern Pacific in 1994–1995.

New York City was decommissioned and struck from the Naval Vessel Register on 30 April 1997 and entered the Ship-Submarine Recycling Program at the Puget Sound Naval Shipyard, in Bremerton, Washington.

== Awards ==
During her operational career, New York City received four Meritorious Unit Commendations, one Navy Expeditionary Medal, and one Secretary of the Navy Letter of Commendation.
