= List of ships named City of New York =

Several ships have been named City of New York, including:

- City of New York (1852), a screw steamer sank by storms during Burnside's North Carolina Expedition off Hatteras Inlet on January 13, 1862
- SS City of New York (1861), a transatlantic passenger ship of Inman Line, wrecked at Queenstown (Cobh), Ireland in 1864
- SS City of New York (1863), a Great Lakes steam barge, sank in Lake Ontario in 1921
- City of New York (1865), a transatlantic passenger ship, launched as Delaware, completed for Inman Line to replace the 1861 vessel. Sold to Allan Line in 1883 and renamed Norwegian. Scrapped in 1903
- City of New York (1875), a passenger-cargo vessel of Pacific Mail Steamship Company, wrecked off Point Bonita, California on 26 October 1893
- City of New York (1885), Admiral Byrd's polar expedition ship
- SS City of New York (1888), a passenger ship of Inman Line, designed to be the largest and fastest liner on the Atlantic. Later with American Line as New York and broken up in 1923
- MV City of New York (1929), a passenger-cargo vessel of American South African Line, sunk by submarine on 29 March 1942.
- TSS City of New York (1947), a cargo vessel of Ellerman Lines, scrapped as Kavo Matapas in 1969

== See also ==
- List of ships named New York
- List of ships named New York City
