= NYC (disambiguation) =

NYC, or New York City, is the most populous city in the United States.

NYC or nyc may also refer to:

== Related to New York City ==
- .nyc, a top level internet domain for New York City
- New York City (video game), a 1984 Atari 400/800/XL and Commodore 64 video game
- New York Central Railroad, an American Class I railroad (1853–1968)
- New York City FC (NYCFC), a Major League Soccer club

== Music ==
- NYC (band), a 2010 Japanese boy band
- NYC (album), by Kieran Hebden and Steve Reid, 2008
- NYC (EP), by Prince, 1997
- "NYC" (song), by Interpol, 2003
- "Akuma na Koi / NYC", a 2009 single album by Yuma Nakayama and NYC
- "NYC", a song by Kevin Rudolf from In the City
- "N.Y.C.", a song by Steve Earle from El Corazón
- "N.Y.C.", a song from the musical Annie
- "NYC", a 2013 song by Dido from her compilation album Greatest Hits
- "NYC (There's No Need to Stop)", a song by The Charlatans from their 2006 album Simpatico

== Other uses ==
- National Youth Competition (rugby league), an Australasian rugby league football competition
- North York Centre, a district in Toronto
- Northern Yacht Club (founded 1824), which became the Royal Northern Yacht Club in 1830, now the Royal Northern and Clyde Yacht Club
- Nazarene Youth Conference, an international convention for high-school age Church of the Nazarene members
- Nyanga-li language (ISO 639-3 code: nyc)

== See also ==
- New York City (disambiguation)
