= Angel Haze =

American rapper and singer (born 1991)

ROES
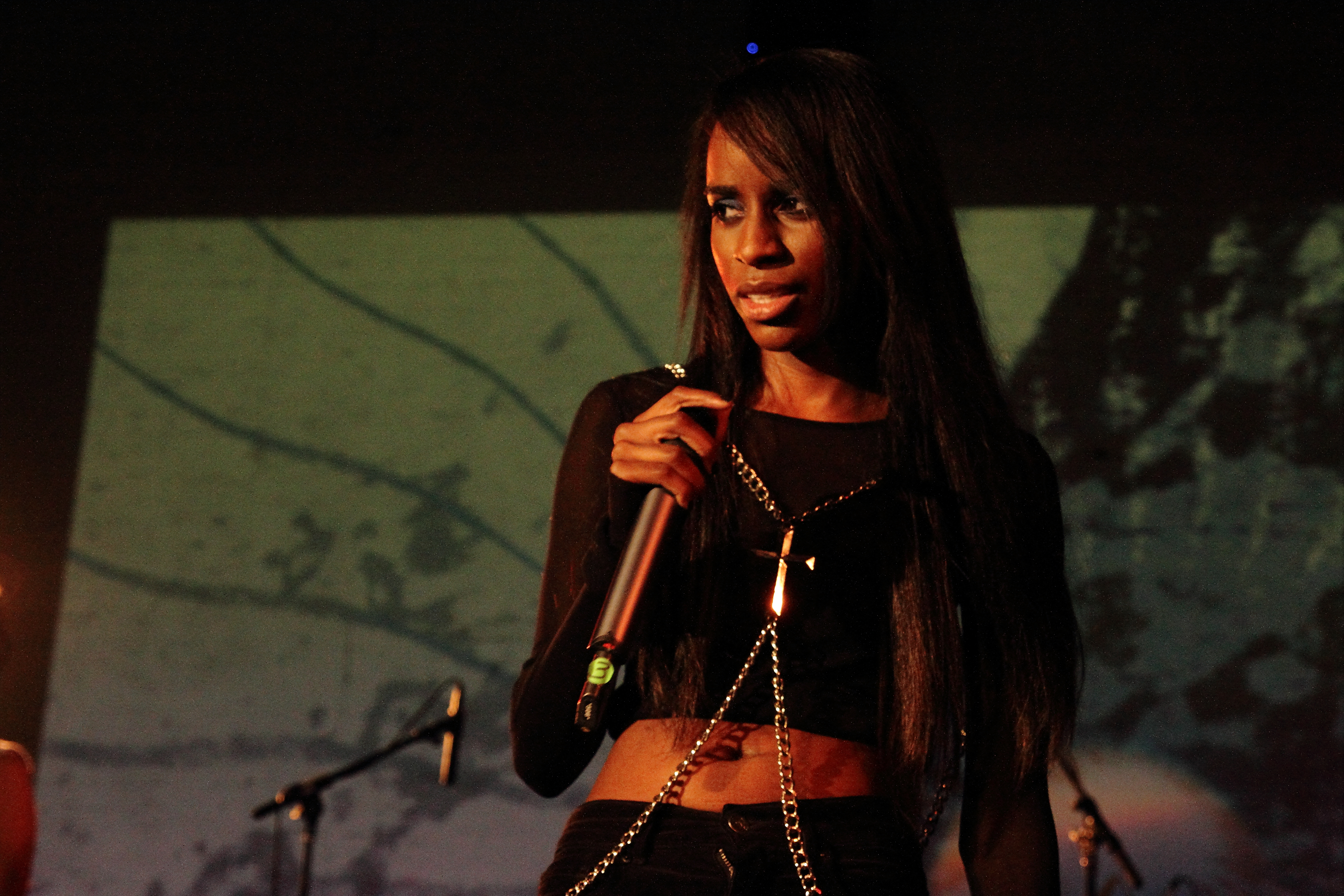
- Wilson performing in October 2012

Background information
- Born: Raykeea Angel Wilson; July 10, 1991 (age 35); Detroit, Michigan, U.S.
- Origin: Brooklyn, New York
- Genre: Hip-hop
- Occupations: Rapper; singer
- Years active: 2011–present
- Labels: Republic; Island

Raykeea Raeen-Roes Wilson (born July 10, 1991), known professionally as ROES (formerly known as Angel Haze), is an American rapper and singer. In 2012, Wilson released the mixtape Reservation and later signed a record deal with Universal Republic Records before moving to Republic Records. On December 31, 2013, Wilson released their debut album Dirty Gold, which featured the singles "Echelon (It's My Way)" and "Battle Cry". Wilson has released a number of mixtapes, the most recent being Back to the Woods in 2015.

== Early life ==
Wilson was born in Detroit, Michigan, to a military family. Their father, who died from a gunshot wound before their birth, was African American and their mother is of Cherokee descent. They have said they have Blackfoot and Creole ancestry, but that their mother did not raise them "to be anything—not black, not native, not Creole, not anything...we didn’t have any regard for any of that shit". They said that Black and Native children at school regarded them as not "black enough" and not "native enough". When Wilson was a young child, their mother met a preacher in the Greater Apostolic Faith and the two moved into his home with his wife and children, into what Wilson describes as a cult. Growing up in the church, Wilson witnessed domestic violence and manipulation at a very young age. As a child, they were sexually abused by a man close to the family. Wilson also recalls being told that they would die spontaneously if they did not behave correctly. In an interview with The Guardian, Wilson stated: "We all lived in the same community, within 10 minutes of each other. You weren't allowed to talk to anyone outside of that, you weren't allowed to wear jewelry, listen to music, to eat certain things, to date people … you weren't allowed to do pretty much anything."

After a pastor threatened Wilson's mother, the family left the church, moving to Brooklyn, New York, when they were 15 years old. The pastor told Haze's family that God was going to kill them, and they lived in fear for years afterward. Wilson's family moved around frequently, mainly due to their mother running away from the church. At one point the family was living in a shelter and Wilson was teased at school for it. They were also mocked for their clothes and had difficulties making friends and connections due to moving around. They switched between homeschool and public school for many years and finished high school a year early.

Wilson began writing as a form of therapy and expressed an interest in creative writing, poetry and journalism. Their first poem was published at the age of 13 after winning a school competition. As a child, Wilson took creative writing lessons and wanted to be a songwriter or gospel artist. Eventually, they began making YouTube videos and freestyle rapping at the age of 18. Wilson began distributing music on the Internet through sites such as Tumblr, where a fan base began to form.

== Career ==
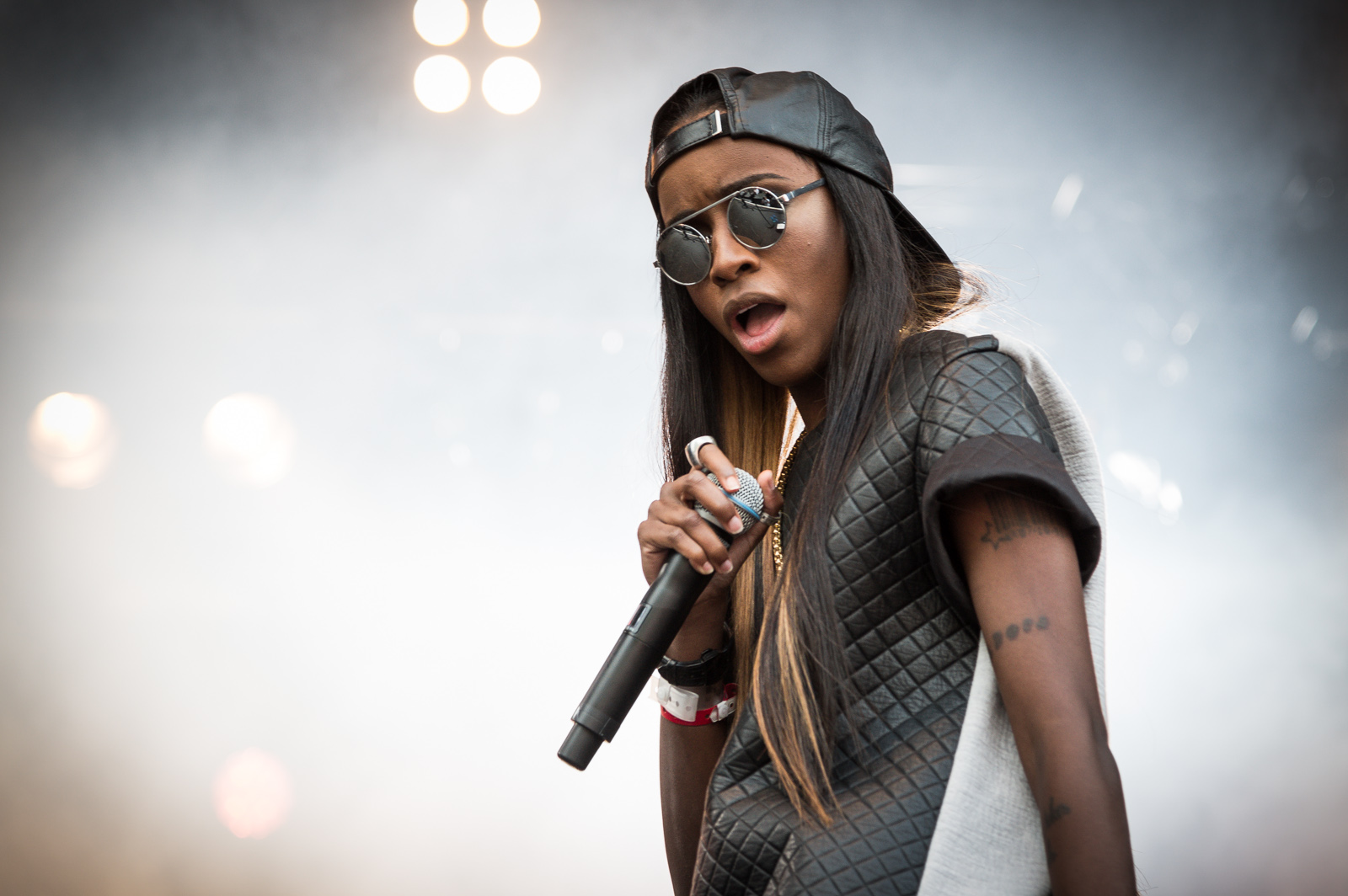
Wilson performing live at Øyafestivalen in 2013

From 2009 to 2012, Wilson put out a number of mixtapes for free download on the Internet: New Moon, Altered Ego, King, and Voice. In July 2012, they released the free mixtape Reservation to critical acclaim, receiving an 88/100 score from Metacritic. The title Reservation is an homage to their Cherokee heritage. Wilson was nominated for BBC the Sound of 2013 poll.

In 2012, Wilson recounted their experience of being sexually assaulted as a child in "Cleaning Out My Closet," a song from the mixtape Classick that uses segments from Eminem's song of the same name.

On August 28, 2013, Wilson released "Echelon (It's My Way)" as the lead single from the debut album Dirty Gold. The entire album was leaked on December 18, 2013, prior to scheduled March 2014 release. The album release date was advanced, and it appeared through Island Records and Republic Records on December 30, 2013, to positive reviews. It had low first-week sales of just over 500 copies. On September 14, 2015, Wilson released the mixtape Back to the Woods announcing that the project was just "something to share before a sophomore". In March 2017 Wilson released "Resurrection".

== Artistry ==
=== Influences ===
After Wilson moved to New York and began listening to secular music, they became inspired by artists such as Eminem, Kanye West, Nicki Minaj, Drake and Lil Wayne. "The artists that I identify [with] mostly are the ones who are so uncompromisingly themselves," Wilson said in a 2014 Rolling Stone interview. "Like, 'Fuck you. I don't care what you think about it. This is who I am. And I can either force-feed you this shit, or you can take it as you will.'"

=== Public image ===
Wilson raps about themes such as homophobia, rape culture and racism. They use their personal experiences to condemn a culture that breeds the self-harm of queer youth. Wilson has also been open about their experience with mental illnesses such as addiction, posttraumatic stress disorder (PTSD), depression and anorexia in their music and in interviews and social media.

Wilson sees their goal as an artist to reach out to people who are similar to them or going through difficult experiences. They said, "It's not about the Bible. It's not about going to church. It's not about anything other than that we are all energies connected with a force that's greater than us. It's an energy that's omniscient, it covers the whole world, and everybody here is created for a reason. Mine happens to be to make the music and inspire the people who are stuck in dark places."

In a 2014 Vice column, Wilson discussed cultural appropriation and white artists making hip hop, saying "There seems to be this hypocrisy because people want to appropriate black culture but only when it's cool or beneficial to them … And that's the reason that people don't have a right, to some extent, to use black music to their own gains."

== Personal life ==
Wilson is pansexual and agender. They have said: "People talking about me, like, 'I'm glad there's an actual woman of color representing queerness and pansexuality, someone who is like me in the spotlight.'" In 2015, Wilson noted that in an interview with BuzzFeed that they identify as neither male nor female and explained, "I feel like my agenderness and my gender identity have evolved". In 2016, they told the Evening Standard that they preferred he/him or she/her pronouns, expressing their feeling that, when reading articles about themself, "I sound like four people when I get written about as 'they.' It drives me crazy ... If you call me 'him' or 'her,' it doesn't matter to me. I don't consider myself of any sex. I consider myself an experience." Wilson has since begun using they/them pronouns.

In an interview with The Guardian, Wilson stated that, "Love is boundary-less. If you can make me feel, if you can make me laugh—and that's hard to do—then I can be with you." In 2014, Wilson was in a relationship with model Ireland Baldwin. The two broke up a year later.

Wilson recorded a cover of Macklemore's "Same Love," which chronicled their own personal experiences. They opened up about their struggles with family over sexuality and growing up LGBTQ. In a 2017 Billboard interview they stated, "When I was young … I didn't understand what was going on. I didn't understand that I could be attracted to men and women at the same time."

In 2015, Wilson began working on a body image project titled "The Naked Eye" incorporating nude photographs and interviews of people with body dysmorphia. The project aims to create a conversation about conventional and mainstream beauty standards.

Wilson is self-taught in the Cherokee language. They also self-identify as two-spirit.

== Discography ==
- Dirty Gold (2013)
- Back to the Woods (2015)

== Filmography ==
=== Television ===
Year	Film	Role	Notes
2015	Catfish: The TV Show	Co-host	Season 4 – Episode 3

== Awards and nominations ==
Year	Organization	Award	Work	Result
2012	MTV	Brand New For 2013	—	Nominated
2012	BBC	Sound of 2013	—	Third
2013	Popdust	Next Pop Superstar of 2013	—	Nominated
2013	O Music Awards	Best Web-Born Artist	—	Nominated
2014	BET Awards	Best Female Hip Hop Artist	—	Nominated
2014	MTV Video Music Awards	Best Video with a Social Message	"Battle Cry"	Nominated
2015	GLAAD Media Awards	Outstanding Music Artist	—	Nominated
