= Maria Korporal =

Visual artist

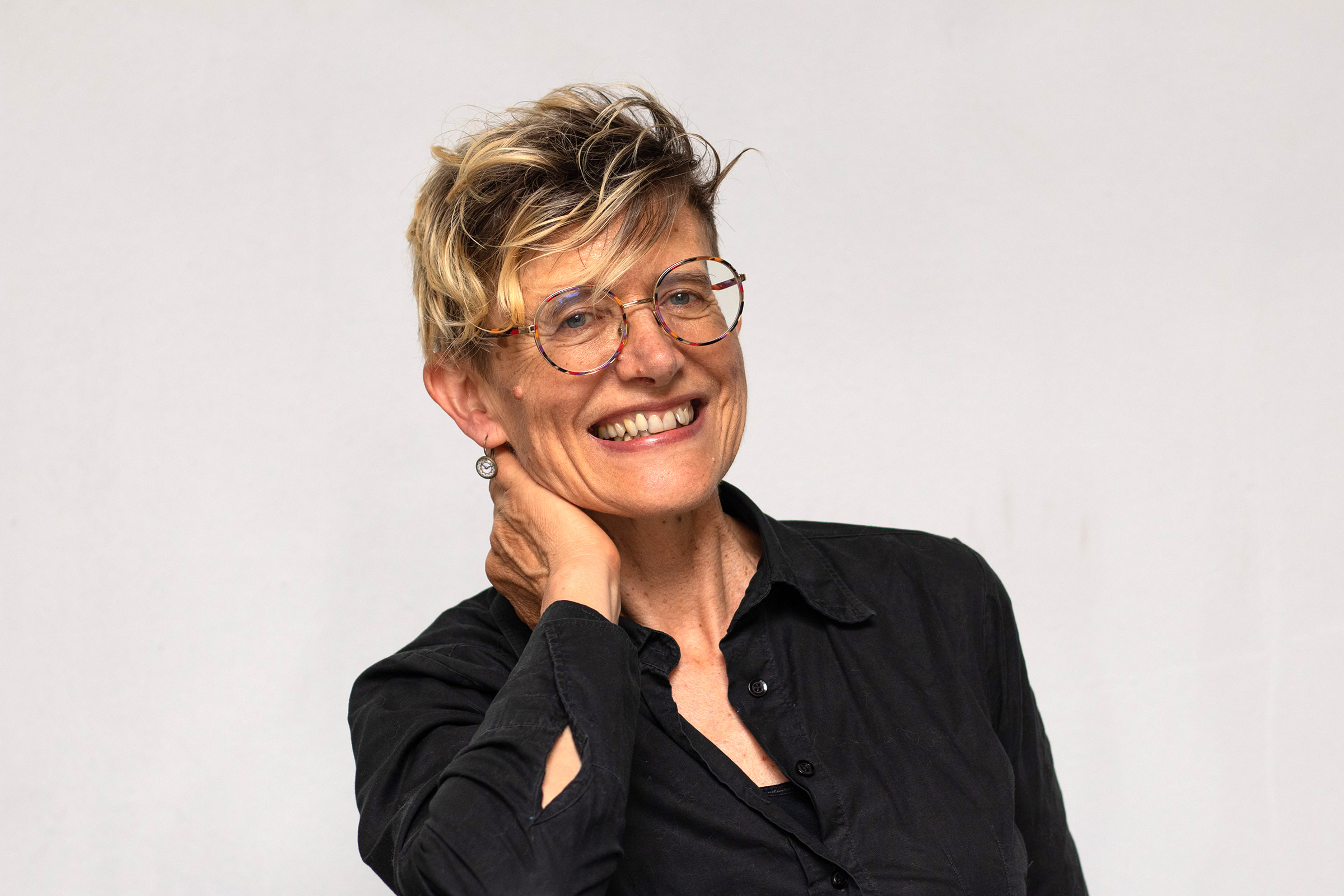
Portrait of Maria Korporal (2023). Photo: Katharina Buccarello

Maria Korporal (* June 1, 1962 in Sliedrecht, Netherlands) is a visual artist. Her artistic focus is on video art, interactive projects, installation, animation film, drawing and artist books.

== Biography ==
Maria Korporal was born Marianne Korporaal, in 2001 she changed her name to Maria Korporal. She studied graphic arts and painting at the St. Joost Academy of Fine Arts in Breda. During her studies from 1981 to 1986, she began working with photography and film and graduated with a video installation. In 1986 she moved to Italy and founded the Italian publishing house Apeiron Editori with Gerrit Van Oord in 1989, where she was responsible for the media design. Until the end of 2013 she lived in Sant'Oreste, Rome, next to Monte Soratte. Then she moved to Berlin, where she lives and works as a freelance artist and web designer.

== Artistic work ==
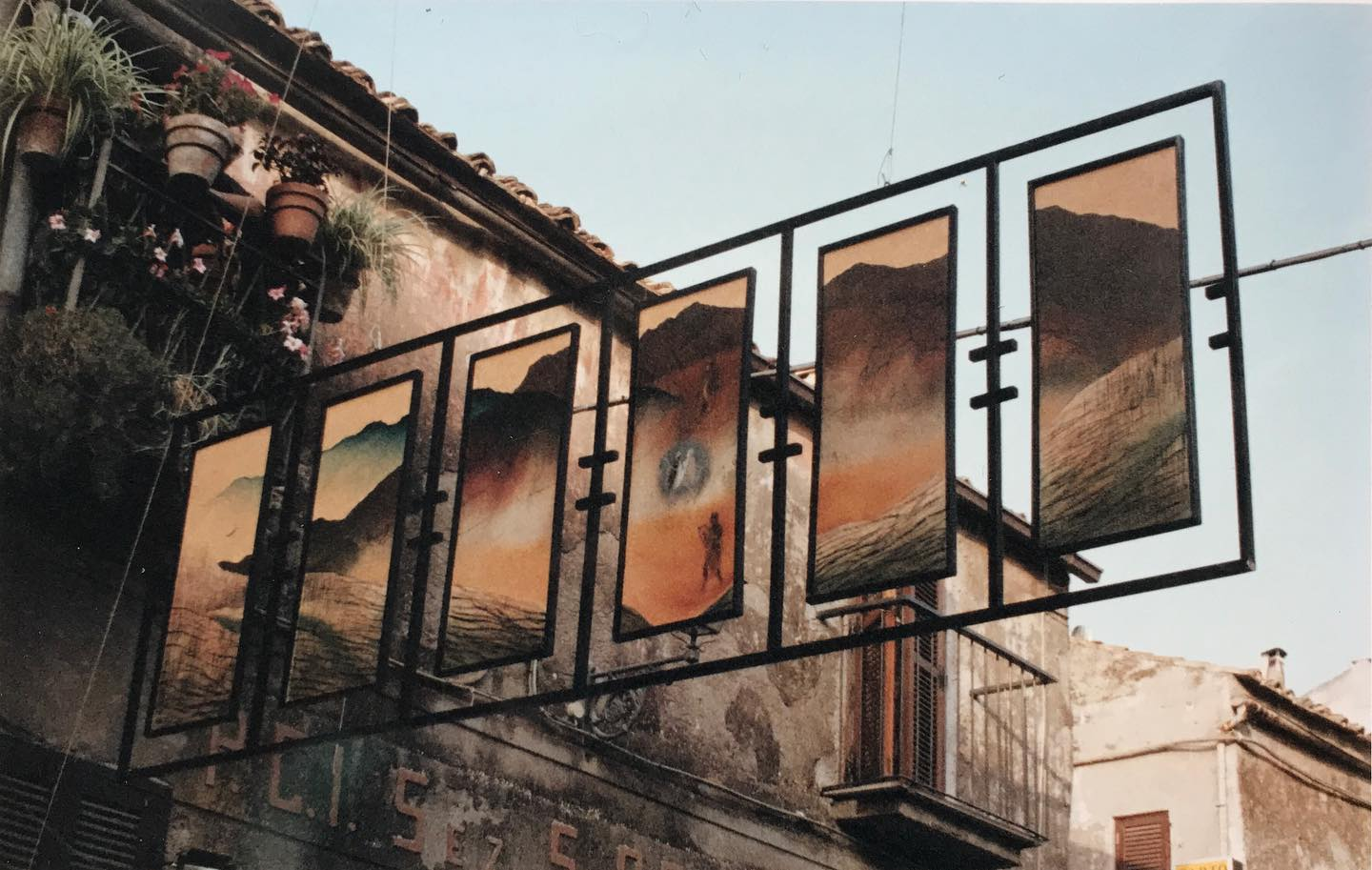
Das Lied von der Erde (The Song of the Earth), a large bilateral painted screen (1989) by Maria Korporal

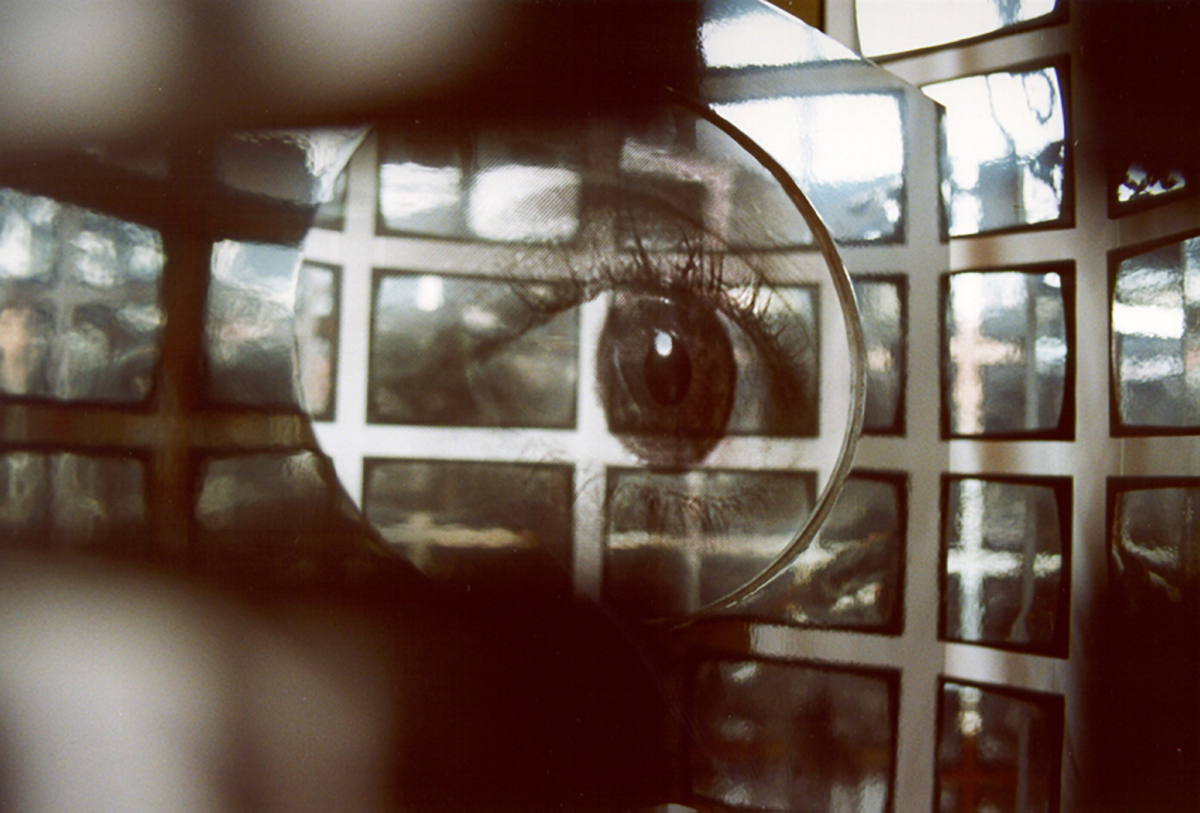
The Eye of the Golem, inkjet and laser print on paper and film, an installation by Maria Korporal, 2000-2018

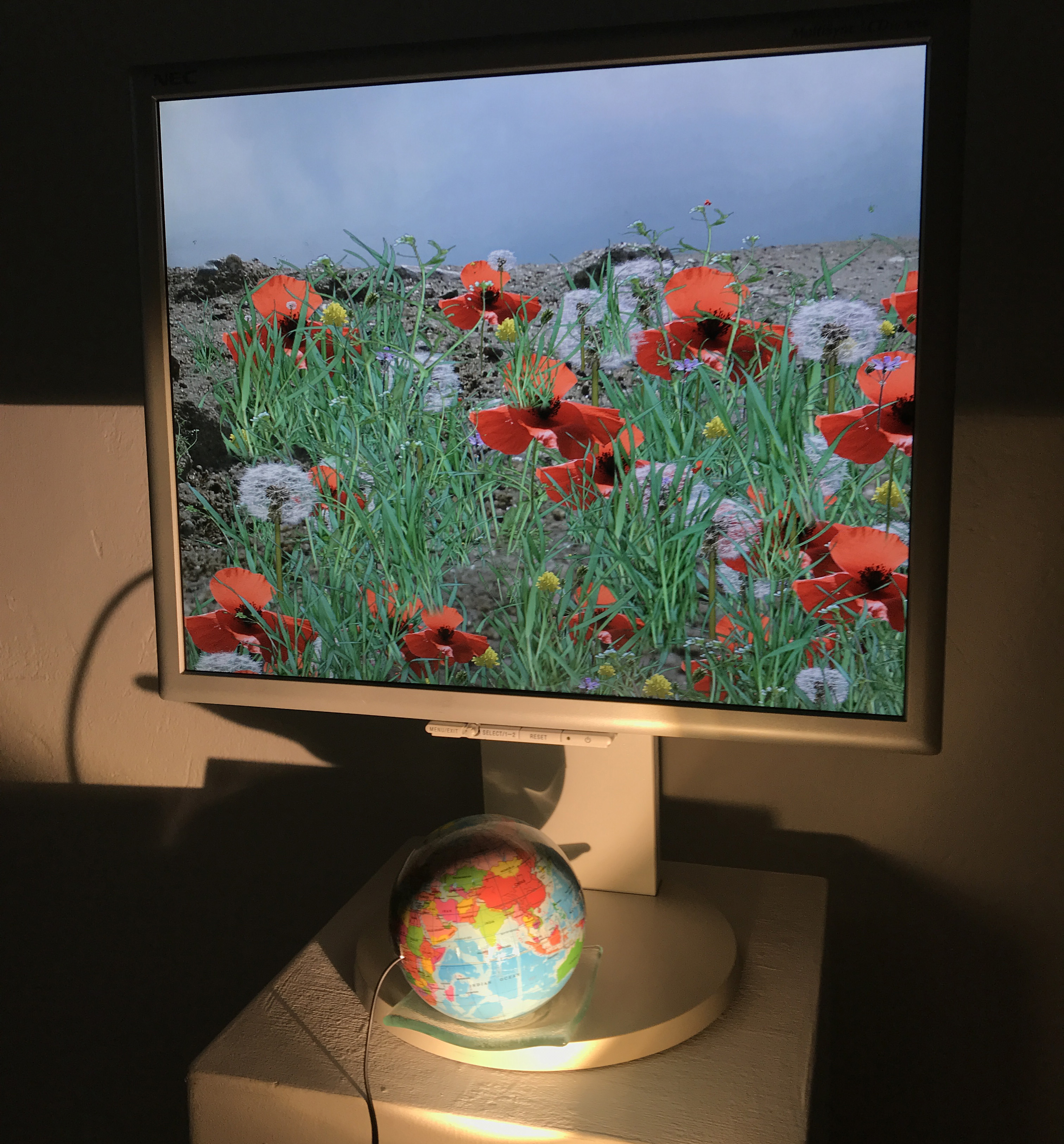
Breathearth, an interactive installation by Maria Korporal (2016-2022)

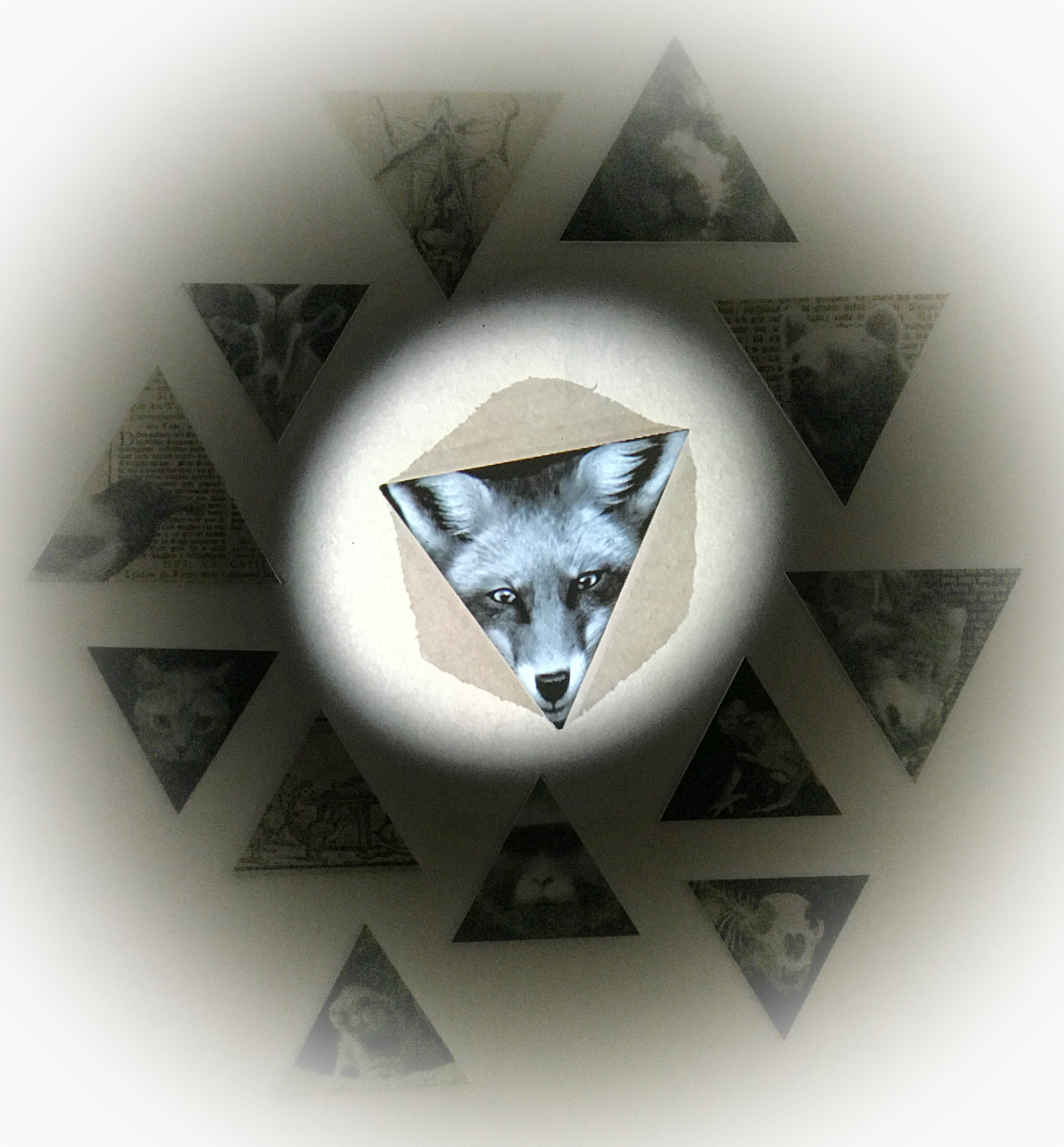
Reynard the Fox, video installation by Maria Korporal (2018)

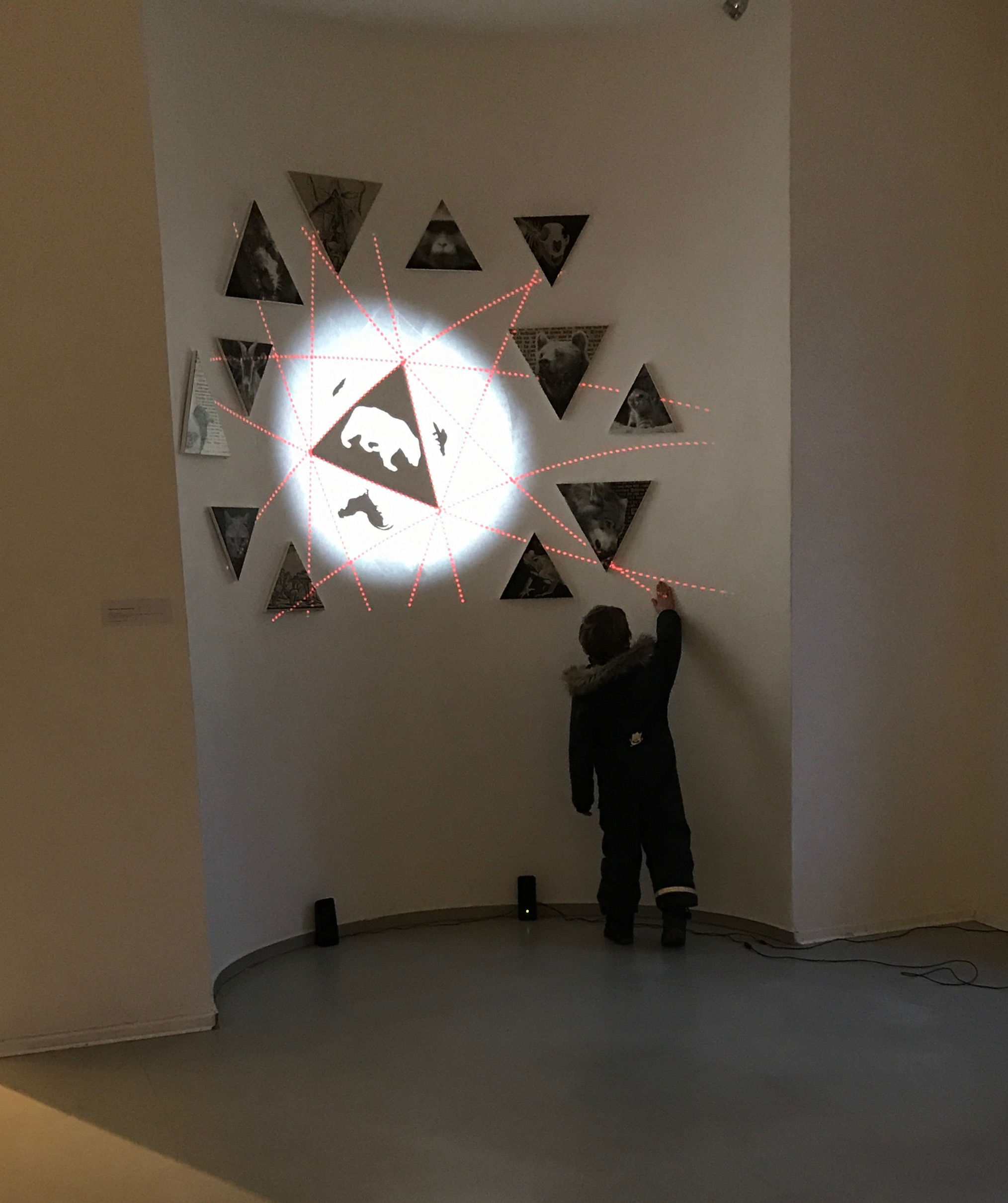
Reynard the Fox, video installation by Maria Korporal (2018)

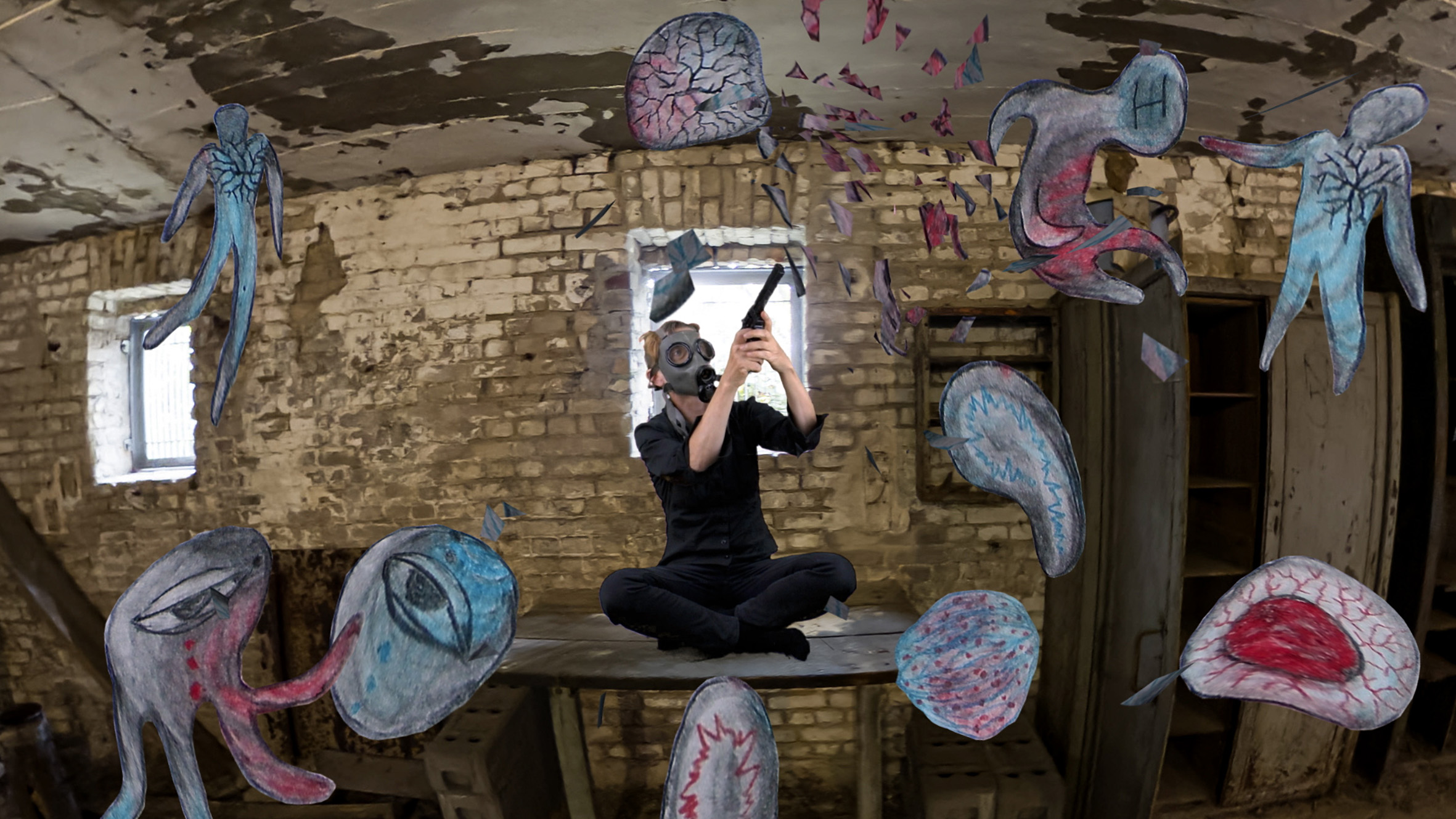
Pervitin Power, video by Maria Korporal (2021)

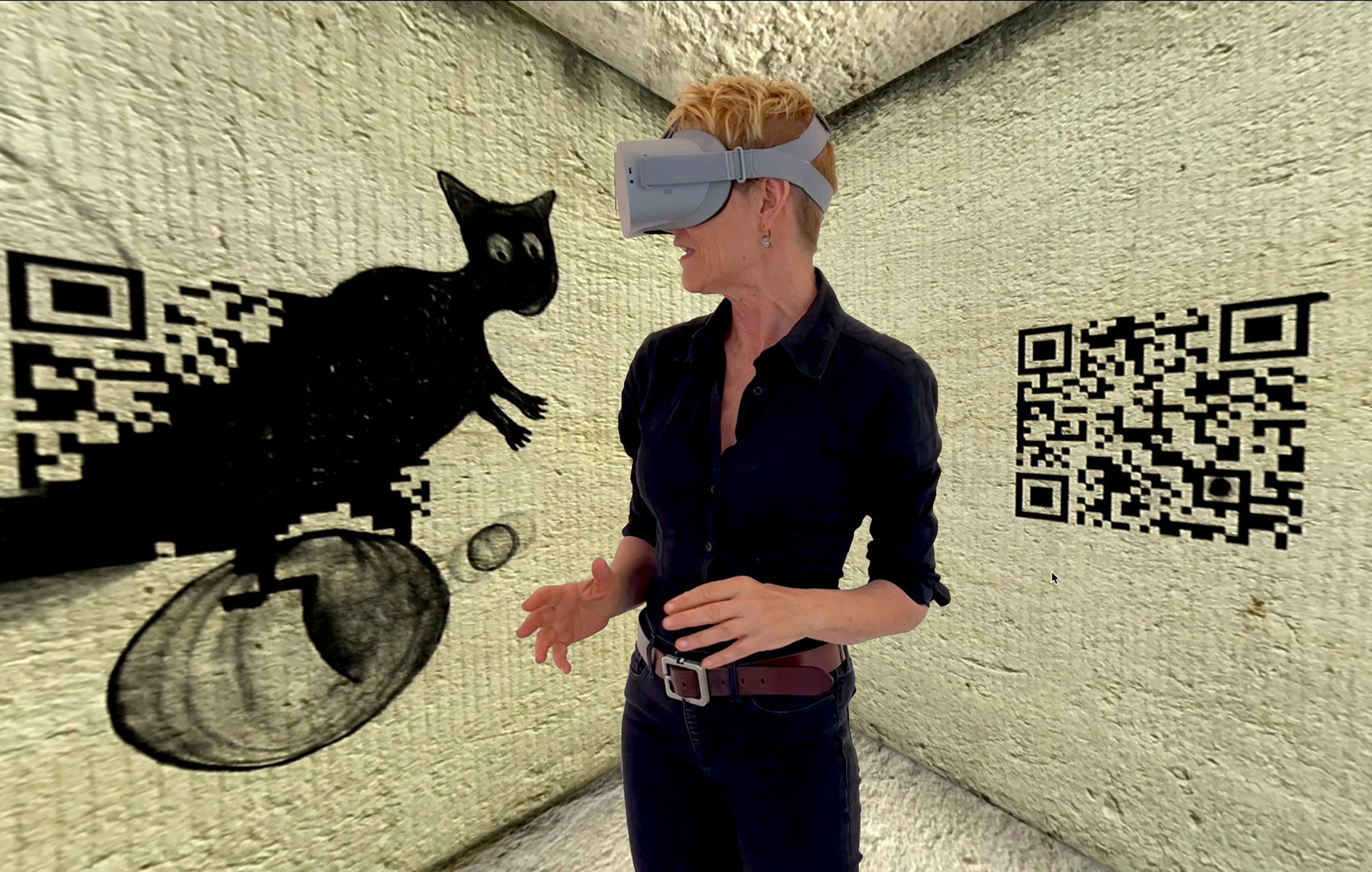
QORPORAL QODES, a multidisciplinary installation by Maria Korporal (2022)

Maria Korporal's artistic production includes video art, interactive projects, installations and drawings. A project of more than 50 drawings and paintings dedicated to the music of Gustav Mahler, Das Lied von der Erde (1988/89) is one of the most important results of her early period in Italy. Activities at her publishing house, Apeiron Editori, stimulated Korporal's involvement with artists' books, of which Satori Soractis (1990) and Contrapuncti (1991) are representative and important for the 1990s.

Since 1998, the artist has been working mainly with new media. Her multimedia works are designed with a wide variety of techniques. The narrative aspect plays a major role in her work. Especially her interactive installations challenge the viewer to participate. Her works play with virtuality and reality, with undergone and artificially generated experiences. Most of her projects deal with social and environmental issues. Particularly noteworthy are projects developed over several years. From 1998 to 2004 Maria Korporal created several installations consisting of computer-processed images, structured like a video wall with imitated screens. Contemporary imagery finds its way largely through screens (television, internet), which has an important impact on the way reality is seen and experienced, as the artist explains about The Rebellious Egg (2004) and also about her cylindrical installation The Eye of the Golem (2000-2018). Golem becomes a symbol of technology and a representative of modern thinking par excellence, able to adapt to different times and circumstances and see itself. Her project Korporal Zoo, a series of video works between 2010 and 2018, observes the animal and human world from cultural, social, and environmental perspectives. Each work is an animated mix of footage in photo and film as well as drawings and collages, a standout example being Reynard the Fox. Since 2021, the artist has returned to working with analog charcoal drawings, creating charcoal and pastel animations, such as S.A.D. (2021) and The Wishing Table (2023). The Breathearth Project (2016-2022) and Emergency Call (2019-2022) are interactive video installations that address the Earth and its changes, natural vegetation disappearing, climatological extremes occurring worldwide. Korporal also develops a form of 360° video and works with virtual reality, as well as augmented reality. In her works such as Pervitin Power (2021), Qorporal Qodes (2022) and Qat Qube (2023), she uses a combination of analog and digital techniques to explore certain themes in depth.

Maria Korporal is an active member of the Verein Berliner Künstler (Association of Berlin Artists) and the project space Group Global 3000 - Art and Other Sustainabilities in Berlin. Her videos are represented in Italy by VisualContainer, Milan.

Her works have been shown and awarded internationally in numerous exhibitions. Festivals where her videos have been presented are: Cyland - International Media Art Festival, Digital Media Fest, FIVAC, Video Art Miden, Fest Anča, FONLAD, Food Film Fest, Madatac, Now & After, Unabhängiges Medienfestival Tübingen, WRO Media Art Biennale, InVideo, Bolzano Short Film Festival, Inheritance Festival, Instants Vidéo, Proyector, Magmart, MashRome FilmFest, Mediawave Festival, Strangloscope, Cyberfest, ReggioFilmFestival, The Short Nights of Berlin, Over the Real, Ibrida, Vertical Movie Festival, Videomedeja, Vierte Welle Festival.

== Exhibitions (selection) ==
- 2023: Screening of 12 videos by Maria Korporal, Premio Borgo Video (solo), curated by Galerie La scala d’oro, Sala Dionigi (Chiesa Valdese), Rome, Italy
- 2023: Irritation: The Art of Getting Lost, Vebikus Kunsthalle Schaffhausen, Switzerland
- 2023: Irritation: eine maximale ästhetische Verwirrung, Galerie Verein Berliner Künstler, Berlin
- 2022: außer sich – inner ich / part 2, INSELGALERIE, Berlin
- 2021: Beuys for Future, Group Global 3000, Berlin
- 2020: Im bewegten Labyrinth. Videokunst und andere Aktionen von Maria Korporal (solo), LortzingART, Hanover, Germany
- 2020: Maria Korporal Monography. Selected works 2008-2020 (solo), VisualcontainerTV
- 2019: Empört Euch!, Interdisziplinäres Kunstprojekt von 68elf im Bunker K101, Cologne, Germany
- 2019: Lines in Between the Maze (solo), Directors Lounge Screening, Z-Bar, Berlin
- 2018/2019: Posun v čase/Zeitverschiebung, galleries NSPU + ABF, Prague, and Galerie Verein Berliner Künstler, Berlin
- 2018: Under Another Roof, IA&A at Hillyer, Washington DC
- 2018: Under the Same Roof, Galerie Sala 1, Rome
- 2018: Maria Korporal: 6x5video (solo), Studio TiEpolo38, Rome
- 2015: Prospettive circolari del terzo occhio festival Bologna in Lettere, Bologna, Italy
- 2006: Altre visioni: Libertà Politica Territorio, Padiglione del Venezuela, Biennale di Venezia, 10. Mostra Internazionale di Architettura, with com.plot S.Y.S.tem
- 2002: Rondom Mahler (solo), Galerie De Heeren van Voorburg, The Hague, the Netherlands
- 2000: L’occhio del Golem (solo), Il Granarone, Calcata, Italy
- 1999: La notte di Valpurga (solo), Gallery Al ferro di cavallo, Rome
- 1994: LAPSUS - Libri d’artista, Biblioteca Nazionale Centrale, Rom
- 1993: Tridentità, zuratet by Toni Maraini, Dutch Institute, Rome
- 1990: Satori Soractis (solo), Galerie Valeton & Henstra, Amsterdam
- 1990: Re maggiore, re minore (solo), Castel dell’Ovo, Naples

== Awards and residences ==
- VII. Premio internazionale Massenzio Arte, Rome 2003
- Premio BazzanoPoesia, Carta Bianca, Bazzano 2010
- Oltre i libri – l'arte del presente incontra i libri del passato, Biblioteca Angelica, Rome 2016
- Neuenburger Kunstwoche, Neuenburg, Zetel 2019
- Premio Borgo Video, gallery La scala d’oro, Rome 2022
- Digital Media Fest, Best Original Idea in the section Virtual Reality, Rome 2022

== Publications (selection) ==
- Bruno Munari, Luciano Marziano: Lapsus. Libri d'artista. Rassegna dell'Editoria 'Libro 94'. Biblioteca Nazionale Centrale di Roma, Rome 1994, EAN 2560369186176
- Il canto della terra. La musica mahleriana nella pittura di Marianne Korporaal. Apeiron Editori, Sant'Oreste (Rome) 1995, ISBN 978-88-85978-13-3
- William Molducci: Teleschermi digitali. Computerarte di Maria Korporal, in: Computer Graphics & Publishing, March/April 2004, ISSN 1127-8544
- Michele Emanuele Mercurio: Maria Korporal, in: b> #04, Winter 2005, ISSN 1824-9361, EAN 9771824936004
- Krzysztof Dobrowolski, Agnieszka Kubicka-Dzieduszycka: WRO 09 Expanded City, 13th Media Art Biennale, Centrum Sztuki WRO, Wroclaw 2009, ISBN 978-83-921797-9-5
- Sandra Lischi, Elena Marcheschi: No Destination/ Senza meta, INVIDEO 2009. Mimesis Edizioni, Milan 2009, ISBN 978-88-575-0056-0
- Christiane Gaebert: Ist Genuss käuflich?, in: nummereinhundertzweiundzwanzig, Zeitschrift für Kultur in Würzburg und anderswo, 2017
- Piero Deggiovanni: Antologia critica della videoarte italiana 2010-2020. Edizioni Kaplan, Turin 2019, ISBN 978-88-99559-35-9
- Posun v čase/Zeitverschiebung, ed. by Nové Sdrženi Pražských Umělců, Prague/Berlin 2019, ISBN 978-3-9818399-2-0
- Medianautik, ed. by Verein Berliner Künstler, Berlin 2020/2021, ISBN 978-3-9818399-6-8
- Maddalena Castagnaro, Donato Di Poce: LUX – Abitare la luce. I Quaderni del Bardo edizioni di Stefano Donno, Lecce 2021, ISBN 9798521668540
- Patrizia Bonardi: Dialogo fra artisti e pensatori sociologici - Volume I (Bourdieu - Collana di arte contemporanea e sociologia). Associazione Artists.Sociologists, Bergamo 2021, ISBN 979-12-200-9242-5
- Paisajes Artificiales, Videograma 2, Festival Internacional de Videoarte 2021. Colectivo Patasola, Bogotá 2021, ISBN 978-958-494-694-2
- Irritation, ed. by Verein Berliner Künstler, Berlin 2022, ISBN 978-3-9823979-2-4
