= Soratte Bunker =

- Gallerie del monte Soratte
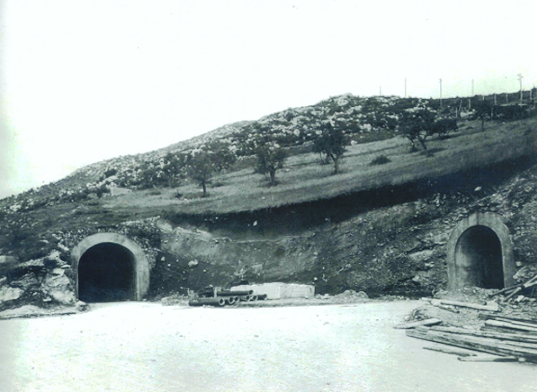
- Early 1940s photo of entrances to the Soratte Bunker

- Location within Lazio

General information
- Location: Metropolitan City of Rome, Kingdom of Italy
- Coordinates: 42°15′N 12°30′E
- Elevation: 691 m (2,267 ft)
- Construction started: 1937
- Completed: 1943
- Owner: Fascist Italy

Technical details
- Material: Concrete, steel, deep excavation

Website
- Official website

The Soratte Bunker is an air raid shelter located under Monte Soratte at Tiber Valley near Rome, Italy.

== History ==
It was part of a subterranean bunker complex constructed between 1937 and 1943. It was the Headquarters used by Generalfeldmarschall Albert Kesselring from September 1943 to June 1944.

=== Construction ===
In the late 1930s, the Italian government commissioned a network of underground galleries and anti-aircraft bunkers under Monte Soratte, about 45 km (28 mi) north of Rome.

Secret excavation work began in 1937 to build a huge air-raid shelter intended to house the Italian government and Comando Supremo should Rome come under siege. The works were conducted by direction of Military Engineering Corps of Rome. Over 4.5 km of underground tunnels were dug into the bowels of the Mountain. The tunnels were reinforced with a layer of cement up to two metres thick and they extended to a depth of over 300 meters (985 feet) underground. The bunker occupied almost 500,000 cubic yards. It had its own water supply, a heating system, electric generator, sewers, radio communications, dormitories, kitchens, storerooms and arms deposits. The complex was initially to spread along 14 km (9 mi) of galleries deep under the mountain, but the work was never completed because of the Italian capitulation.

After the 8 September 1943 Frascati air raid, the extensive bunker became the headquarters of the German occupying forces commanded by Generalfeldmarschall Albert Kesselring.

In the 1950s, the Italian Ministry of Defence used the bunker as a powder magazine before abandoning it in 1962. In the 1960s, during the years of Cold War, the bunker was turned into a fallout shelter for the Italian government and President in case of a nuclear attack on Rome. It would have housed 50 members of the government and 50 NATO technicians. Work on the construction of the atomic bunker began in 1967 and lasted until 1972. In 1989 the bunker fell into disuse. It was kept secret until 2008. Soratte underground network can now be visited.

== Decauville railway ==
On 9 November 2024, an electric Decauville Railway was put into operation in the Monte Soratte bunker, allowing visitors to tour 2.5 km of the previously inaccessible tunnels. The train can also be used independently of the normal tour. What is unusual is that it is a faithful reconstruction of what actually happened here in the mountain. State-of-the-art virtual reality technology is used to recreate history by visualising the bombing of Monte Soratte during the Second World War.

The project was brought to life thanks to many years of effective cooperation between the municipality of Santoreste and the Soratte Bunker Association, which manages the site and looks after the bunker complex. It is now possible to visit the tunnel complex on a narrow-gauge railway, which has been constructed in a modern design that complies with current regulations and can be used by the elderly and children like a fairground ride.

== Epigraph in memory of the crimes of Albert Kesselring ==
On 25 April 2026, in the external part of the tunnels of the Tiber ridge of Monte Soratte, near the entrance, the municipal administration of Sant'Oreste, in the presence of the ANPI partisan associations, historical witnesses and citizens, placed the epigraph; "Lapide ad ignominia" to comrade Kesselring, which Piero Calamandrei placed on 4 December 1952 in the atrium of the Town Hall of Cuneo as a sign of everlasting protest for the release of the Nazi criminal. Field Marshal Albert Kesselring installed the Supreme Command of South-West Europe of the Wehrmacht from 11 September 1943 to 4 June 1944 at Bunker Soratte, where he was responsible for the first roundups which marked the trail of blood during the retreat of the Wehrmacht from Italy.

LAPIDE AD IGNOMINIA, PIETRO CALAMANDREI, 1952

LO AVRAI CAMERATA KESSELRING

IL MONUMENTO CHE PRETENDI DA NOI ITALIANI
MA CON CHE PIETRA SI COSTRUIRÀ
A DECIDERLO TOCCA A NOI
NON COI SASSI AFFUMICATI
DEI BORGHI INERMI STRAZIATI DAL TUO STERMINIO
NON COLLA TERRA DEI CIMITERI
DOVE I NOSTRI COMPAGNI GIOVINETTI
RIPOSANO IN SERENITÀ
NON COLLA NEVE INVIOLATA DELLE MONTAGNE
CHE PER DUE INVERNI TI SFIDARONO
NON COLLA PRIMAVERA DI QUESTE VALLI
CHE TI VIDERO FUGGIRE
MA SOLTANTO COL SILENZIO DEI TORTURATI
PIÙ DURO D'OGNI MACIGNO
SOLTANTO CON LA ROCCIA DI QUESTO PATTO
GIURATO FRA UOMINI LIBERI
CHE VOLONTARI SI ADUNARONO
PER DIGNITÀ E NON PER ODIO
DECISI A RISCATTARE
LA VERGOGNA E IL TERRORE DEL MONDO
SU QUESTE STRADE SE VORRAI TORNARE
AI NOSTRI POSTI CI RITROVERAI
MORTI E VIVI COLLO STESSO IMPEGNO
POPOLO SERRATO INTORNO AL MONUMENTO
CHE SI CHIAMA
ORA E SEMPRE

RESISTENZA

== Gallery ==
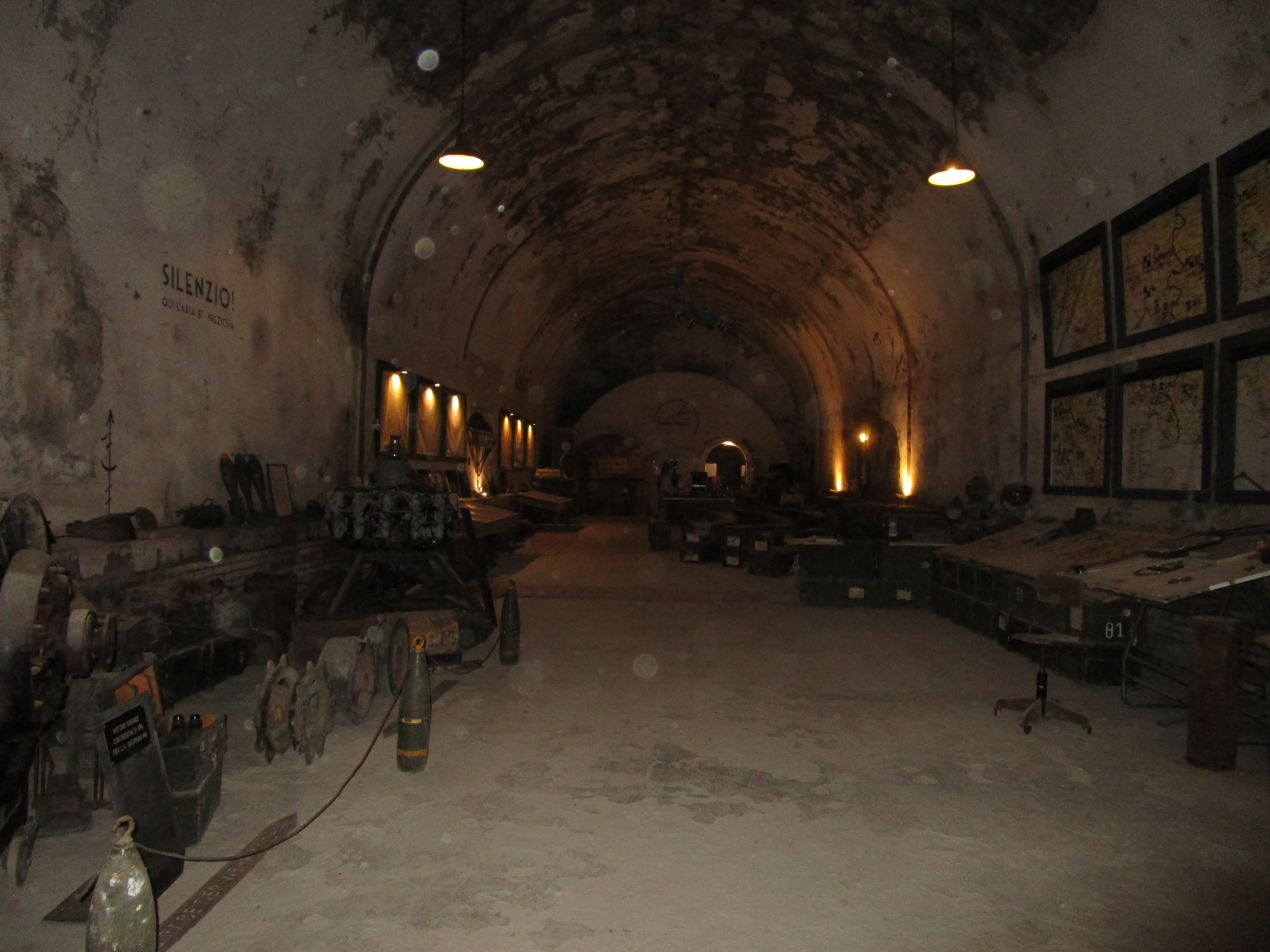
One of the galleries of Soratte bunker

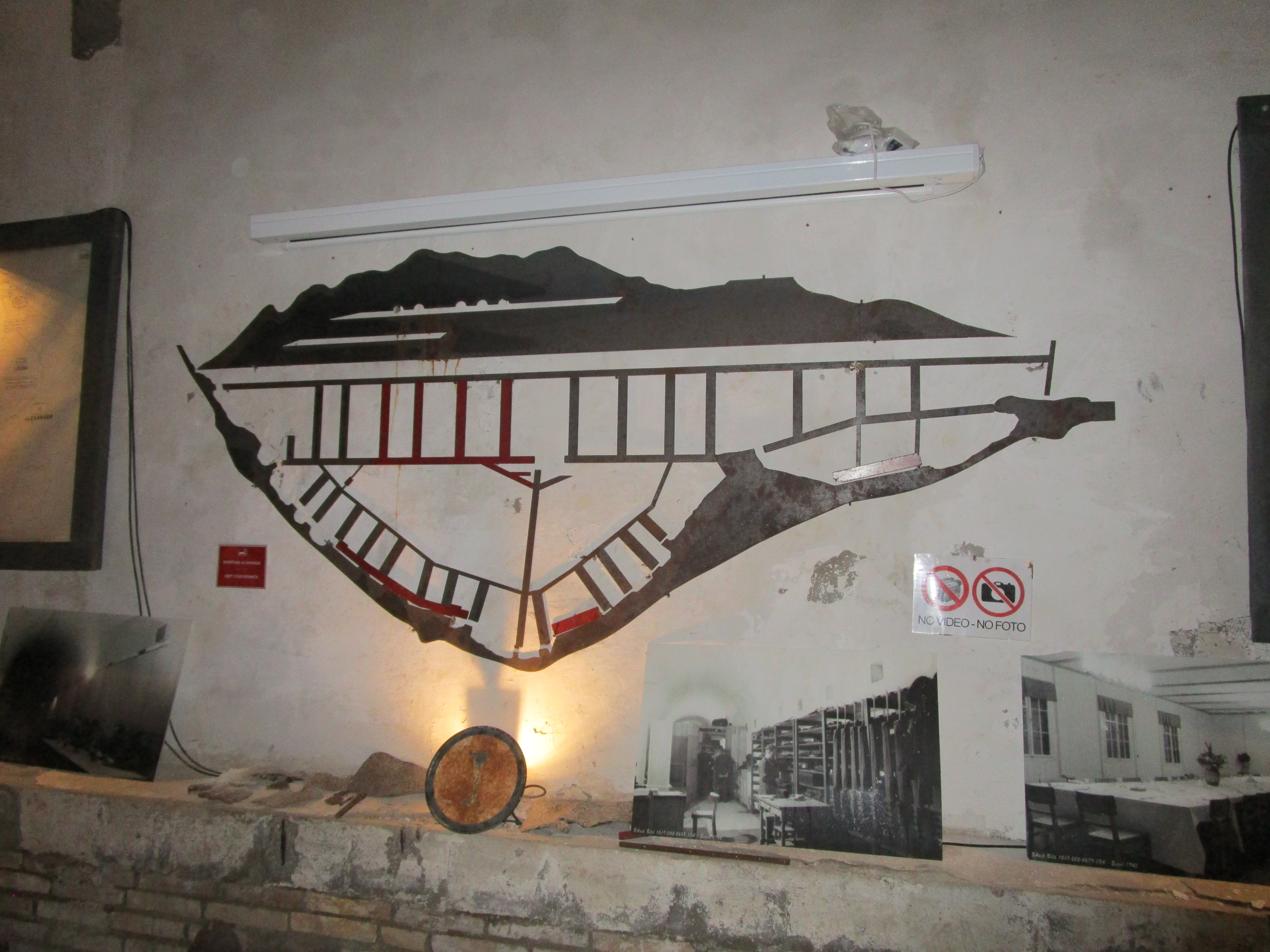
Planimetry in entrance gallery

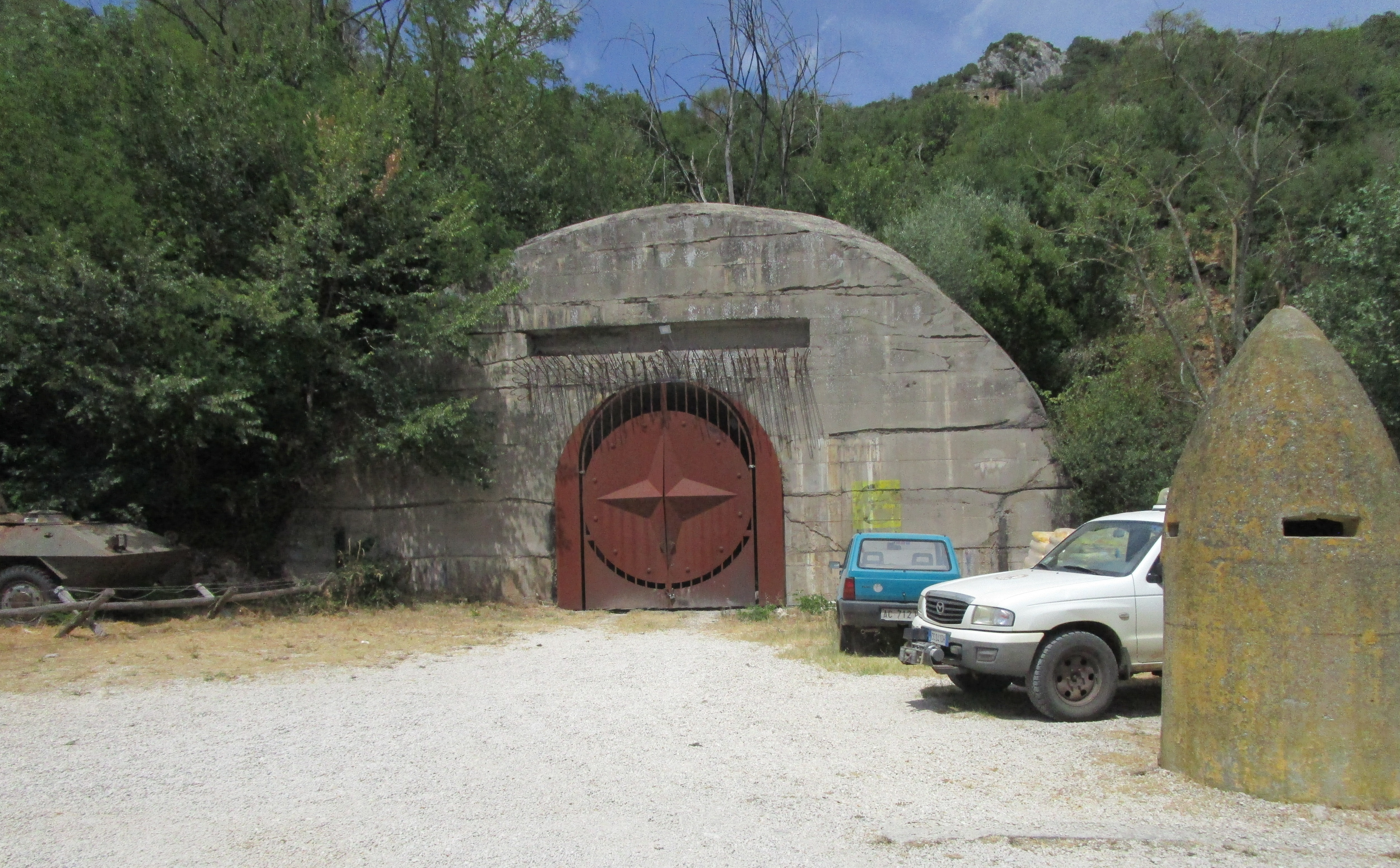
Soratte Bunker's entrance

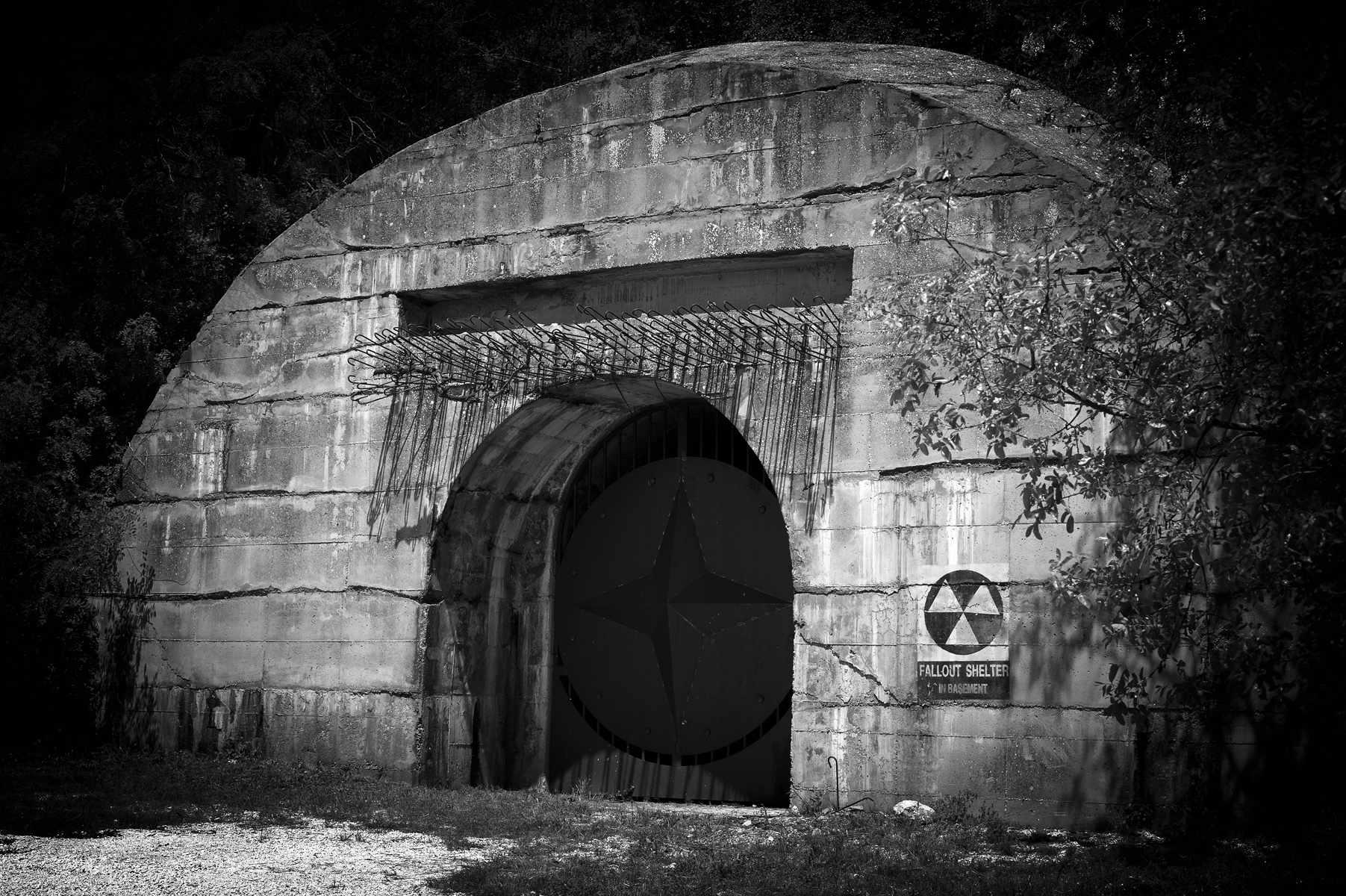
Soratte fallout shelter's blast door est

== Bibliography ==
- Paolucci, Gregory; Lo Gaglio, Giuseppe (2013). Il bunker del Soratte - Una montagna di storia. Bunker Soratte. ISBN 978-88-909450-0-7.
- Pugnaletto, Marina; Paolini, Cesira (2019). "Il bunker antiatomico del monte Soratte". Sustainable Mediterranean Construction (1): 421–426. ISSN 2420-8213.
