= Edistus =

1st-century Christian martyr

Saint Edistus
- Died: c. 60 AD near present day site of Sant'Oreste
- Venerated in: Roman Catholic Church, Eastern Orthodox Church
- Feast: October 12
- Attributes: Young, clean-shaven soldier; palm of martyrdom; white flag with red cross
- Patronage: Sant'Oreste

Saint Edistus (Italian: Sant'Edisto) (also known as Aristus, Orestes, Horestes) is venerated as a martyr and saint by the Roman Catholic and Eastern Orthodox churches. His legend states that he was martyred on the Via Laurentina and his passio places his martyrdom during the reign of Nero, on October 12, 60 AD.

His companions are named as Thermantia (Termanzia), Christina, his servant Victoria, and the priest Priscus.

== Veneration ==
During the papacy of Gregory the Great, there existed at San Paolo fuori le Mura a monastery dedicated to Edistus. In the seventh century, his relics, as well as those belonging to Christina and Victoria, were still venerated there. The sepulcher of Edistus was located at the sixteenth milestone of the Via Ardeatina. A church in honor of him existed there, which was restored during the papacy of Adrian I (772–795). There also existed a papal estate (domusculta) there called Sancti Edisti.

He is patron of an old church on the Monte Soratte, near which a town, Sant'Oreste, is named after him. The first mention of Sant'Oreste is made by Benedict of Soracte in his Chronicon in 747 AD, in which he mentions Curtis Sancii Heristi. One source states that the toponym derives from the family of the Aristi or Edisti. A member of this family was martyred for his faith around 68 AD. Linguistic corruptions transformed the name from Sanctus Edistus to Sanctus Heristus, Santo Resto, San Tresto, Sant'Oreste.

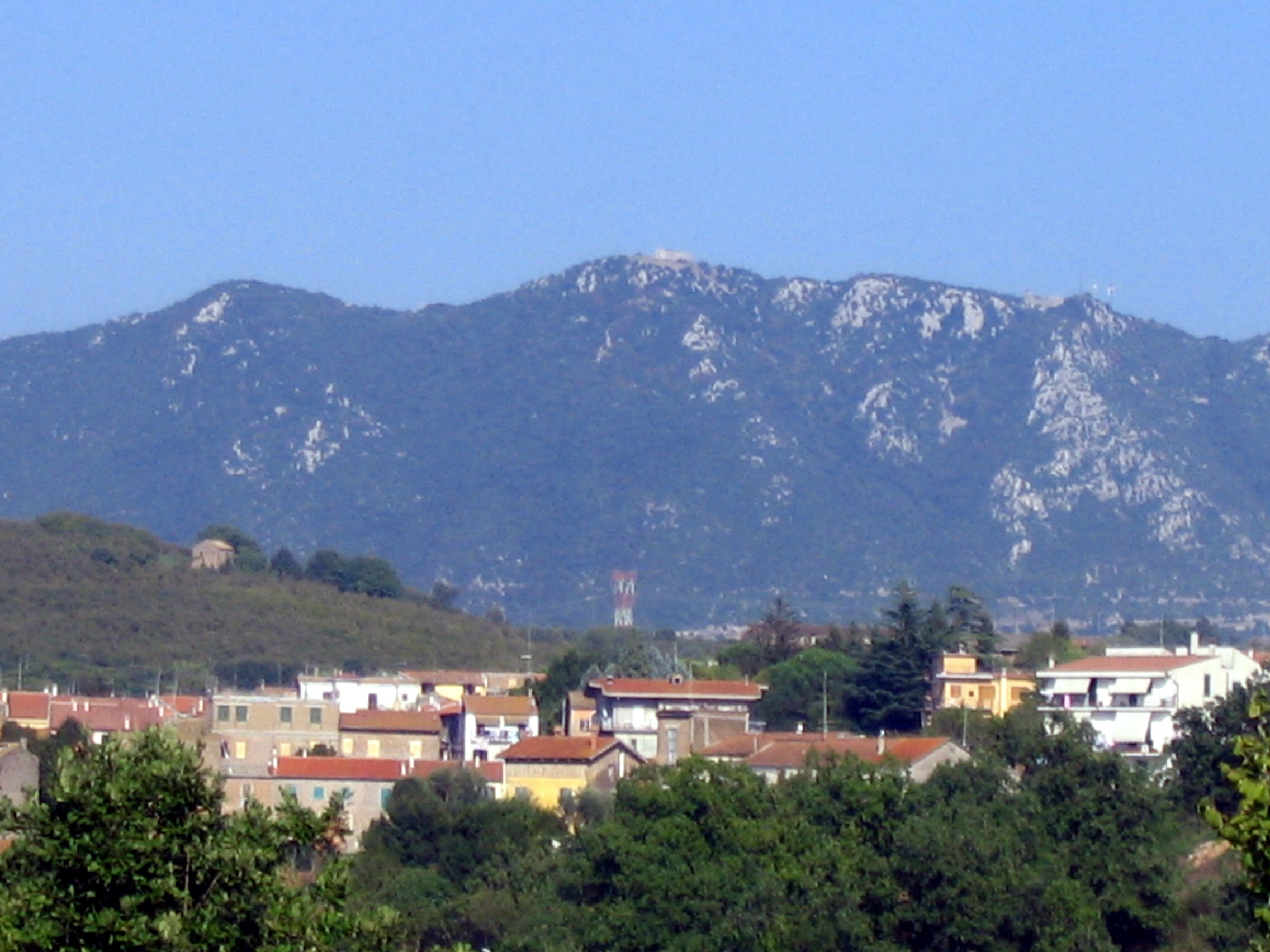
Mount Soratte seen from Via Flaminia.

According to the legendary account of his martyrdom, he was a soldier who had been christened by Saint Peter. At a site called Laurento, a sandpit (arenario), Edistus participated in a mass at which Priscus was officiating. Thermantia, Christina, and the servant Victoria were present. When they were discovered by the authorities, they were buried alive in the same sandpit, with the exception of Victoria, who managed to escape, but who was later killed in a nearby forest.

A church and village grew on the site of sandpit. This was the curtis Sancti Heristi. The village later moved to the slopes of Mount Soratte for better defense against raiders. This became the Castrum Sancti Heristi, later Sant'Oreste. The Romanesque church of Sant'Edisto still exists.
