= Frascati Cathedral =

Cathedral and minor basilica in Frascati, Italy

Coordinates: 41°48′27″N 12°40′54″E

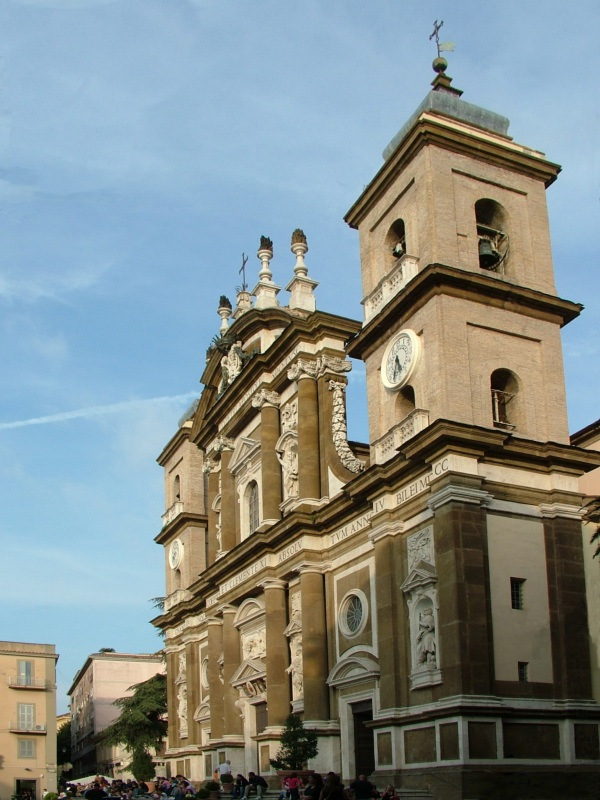
Frascati Cathedral: west front

Frascati Cathedral (Italian: Basilica Cattedrale di San Pietro Apostolo, Duomo di Frascati) is a Roman Catholic cathedral and minor basilica in Frascati, Italy. Dedicated to Saint Peter the Apostle, it is the seat of the Bishop of Frascati.

== Construction ==
Construction on the present building (the fifth cathedral of this see) began in 1598, to the designs of Ottaviano Nonni (best known as Mascherino). After twelve years, on 29 June 1610 the first Mass was celebrated. In 1696 Girolamo Fontana began work on a new façade, which was finished in 1700. The two bell towers on either side of it were constructed later.

== Description ==
The cathedral is built on a Greek cross floorplan, and houses a wooden crucifix of the 11th century from Tusculum, a Madonna (Mysteries of the Rosary) attributed to Domenichino, a relief by Pompeo Ferrucci (1612) representing Jesus handing over the keys to Saint Peter, and a 14th-century Madonna and Child in the Chapel of the Gonfalone, that was retouched by Domenichino.

On the interior side of the west front there is a bronze "Holy Year Cross" of 1750.

== 1943 bombing ==
The interior of the cathedral was destroyed by bombing on 8 September 1943, and so today it appears bare, except for a little chapel off to the right.

== Funerary monument to Charles Edward Stuart ==
In the nave, on the inner side of the façade, there is a white marble funerary monument to Charles Edward Stuart, the Young Pretender, with a memorial tablet. When he died in 1788, his brother, the Cardinal Duke of York and bishop of Frascati, Henry Benedict Stuart, celebrated his funeral here. The cathedral received many tokens of Henry's episcopal concern, most of which are still visible today. When the body of Charles Stuart was transferred to Saint Peter's Basilica in 1807 after the death of Henry, his heart and praecordia were left here in a small urn, placed under the floor below the funerary monument.

== See also ==
- Church of the Gesu (Frascati)
