= Monte Soratte =

Mountain in Italy

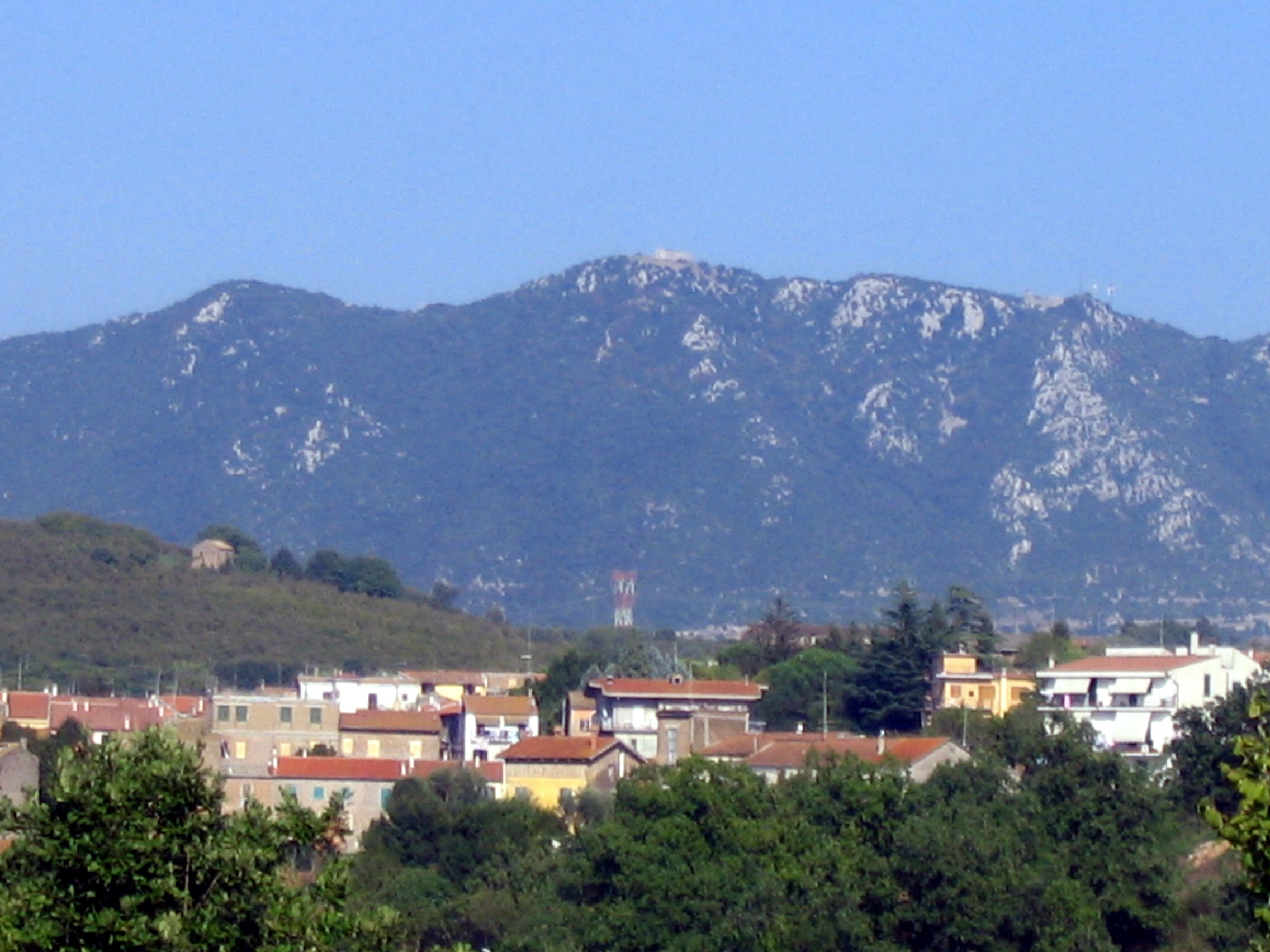
- Mount Soratte seen from Via Flaminia

Highest point
- Elevation: 691 m (2,267 ft)
- Coordinates: 42°15′N 12°30′E

Geography
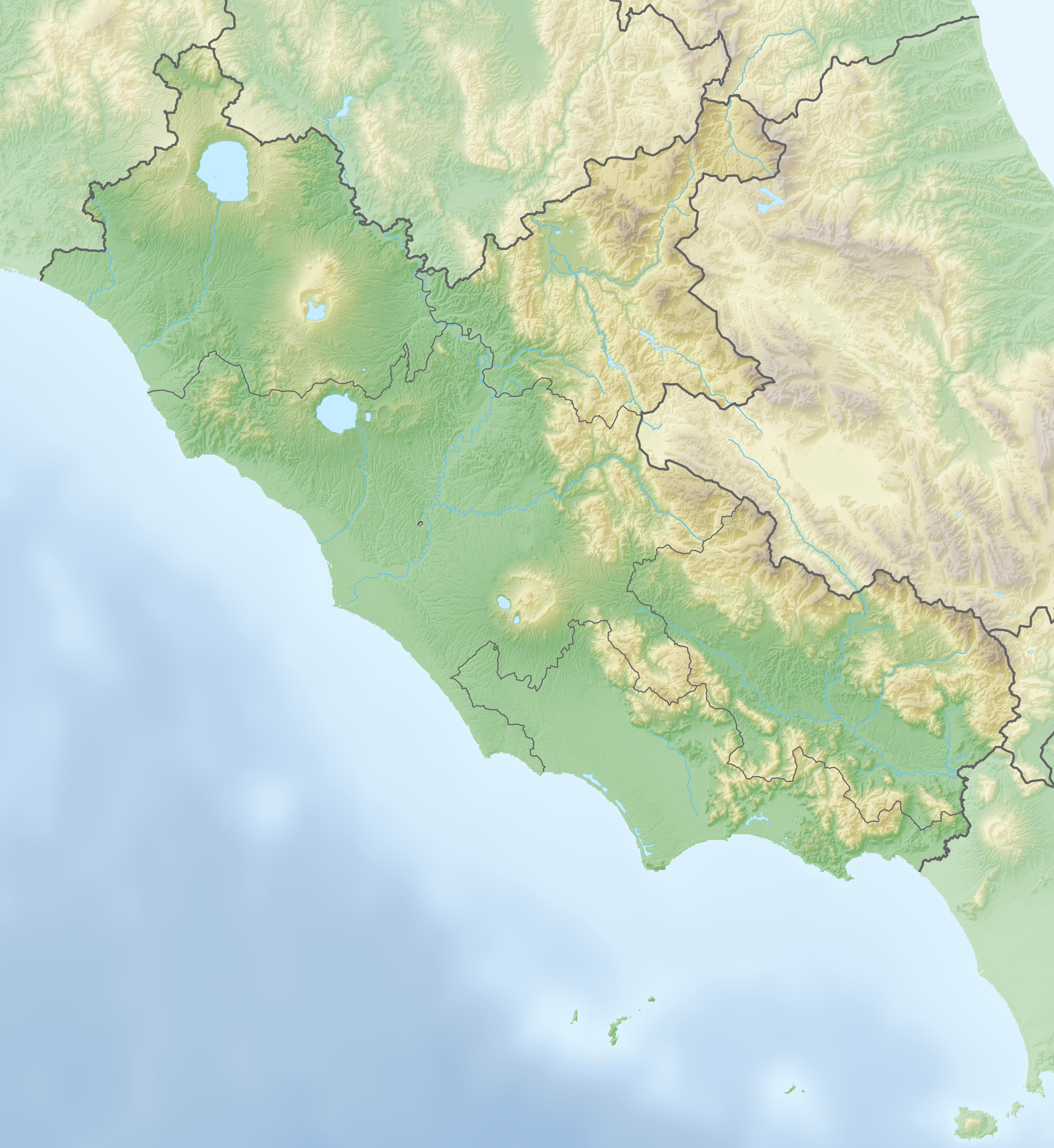
- Location within Italy Location within Lazio
- Location: Italy

Monte Soratte (ancient: Soracte) is a mountain ridge in the Metropolitan City of Rome, central Italy. It is a narrow, isolated limestone ridge with a length of 5.5 km (3.4 mi) and six peaks. Located some 10 km (6.2 mi) south east of Civita Castellana and c. 45 km (28 mi) north of Rome, it is the sole notable ridge in the Tiber Valley, geologically represents the Meso-cenozoic Tiber ridge. The nearest settlement is the village of Sant'Oreste. Saint Orestes or Edistus, after whom the settlement is named, is said to have been martyred near Monte Soratte.

The highest summit is 691 m (2,267 ft) above sea-level. The ridge is part of a 444-hectare (1,100-acre) Natural Reserve housing a variety of vegetation and fauna. It is also characterized by the so-called Meri, pits which can be up to 115 metres (377 ft) deep.

== History and sights ==
Mount Soratte is a sacred mountain of the Falisci, consecrated to their corresponding divinity the Pater Soranus, the likely etymology of the name.

The area was used by the ancient Italic peoples of the area (Etruscan, Falisci, Capenates, Sabines) and the Etruscan civilization for the cult of the Etruscan god Soranus. Mount Soratte was mentioned by Horace ("vides ut alta stet nive candidum Soracte?" Carm. i. 9), and Virgil, who stated that Apollo was its guardian deity.

The hermitage of St. Sylvester is just below the summit. According to a legend, its church was founded by Pope Sylvester, who had taken refuge there to escape Constantine's persecution. The church houses 14th- and 15th-century frescoes. Another four hermitages are on the ridge.

The church of Santa Maria delle Grazie was built in 1835 over a pre-existing 16th-century edifice and houses a once highly venerated image of the Madonna.

Johann Wolfgang von Goethe mentioned the peak in Italian Journey, his diary of his travels through Italy from 1786–1788. He wrote that "Soracte stands out by itself in magnificent solitude. Probably this mountain is made of limestone and belongs to the Apennines."

In his 1902 travelogue The Path to Rome, Hilaire Belloc sketched the mountain in the final days of his walking pilgrimage from Toul and wrote: "It stood up like an acropolis, but it was a citadel for no city. It stood alone, like the soul that once haunted its recesses and prophesied the conquering advent of the northern kings."

During World War II, after the 8 September 1943 Frascati air raid, Field Marshal Albert Kesselring moved his headquarters from Frascati to the bunkers in Monte Soratte.
