= Sant'Oreste =

- Comune
- Comune di Sant'Oreste
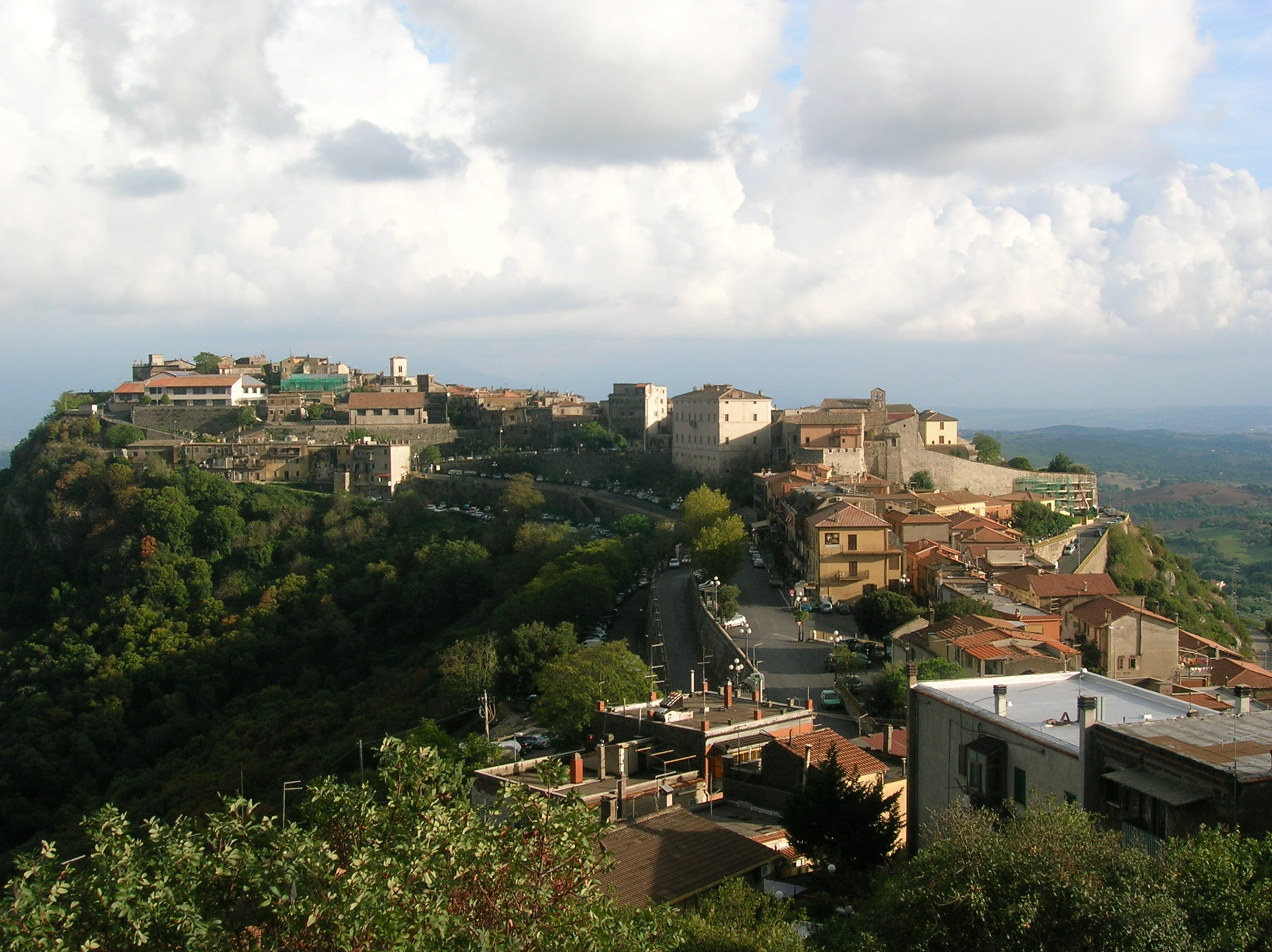
- View of Sant'Oreste

- Location within Italy Location within Lazio
- Coordinates: 42°14′N 12°31′E
- Country: Italy
- Region: Lazio
- Metropolitan city: Rome (RM)

Government
  - Mayor: Gregory Paolucci (Civic list Magnifica Comunità)

Area
  - Total: 44.0 km^{2} (17.0 sq mi)
- Elevation: 420 m (1,380 ft)

Population (1 January 2022)
  - Total: 3,504
  - Density: 79.6/km^{2} (206/sq mi)
- Demonym: Santorestesi
- Time zone: UTC+1 (CET)
  - Summer (DST): UTC+2 (CEST)
- Postal code: 00060
- Dialing code: 0761
- ISTAT code: 058099
- Patron saint: St. Edistus
- Saint day: October 12
- Website: Official website

Sant'Oreste is a comune (municipality) in the Metropolitan City of Rome in the Italian region Lazio, located about 35 kilometres (22 miles) north of Rome. It faces the Monte Soratte, that latter has a natural preserve with the same name.

== History ==
The first mention of Sant'Oreste is made by Benedict of Soracte in his Chronicon in 747 AD, in which he mentions Curtis Sancti Heristi. One source states that the toponym derives from the family of the Aristi or Edisti. A member of this family, Saint Orestes (Edistus, Sant'Edisto, Sant'Oreste) was martyred for his faith around 68 AD. Linguistic corruptions transformed the name from Sanctus Edistus to Sanctus Heristus, Santo Resto, San Tresto, Sant'Oreste.
