= Air raid on Frascati =

Part of World War II

An air raid of USAAF planes against Frascati, a historic town near Rome, Italy, was made on 8 September 1943. The target was the German General Headquarters for the Mediterranean zone (O.B.S.) and the Italian headquarters, scattered in buildings and villas near the town.

== History ==
General Doolittle's operation order of 7 September 1943 was: Intentions for September eight heavies will destroy town of Frascati - This target is important and must be destroyed.

The aircraft headed for Littoria (modern Latina) and Monte Cavo (Alban Hills); they arrived over Frascati at 12:10. Their target was Field Marshal Albert Kesselring and his staff.

The anti-aircraft defence was equipped with heavy anti-aircraft guns of 88/56 mm and light guns of 37 mm and 20 mm, which they had placed on Tuscolo ridge and terraces in the town reinforced with cement pillars to stand the recoils.

The Italian Royal Air Force (Regia Aeronautica) engaged with about 30 aircraft fighters, some obsolete biplane Fiat CR.42s, some Macchi C.200s, Fiat G.50 Freccias, Reggiane Re.2001s, Macchi C.202s and two Fiat G.55s. This was the last mission of Regia Aeronautica before the Armistice with the allied forces. Overall, one Allied aircraft was destroyed, a B-17 of 97th Bomber Group, and 36 fighters were destroyed in the air.

About 50% of the buildings, many of the monuments and villas were destroyed. St. Pietro square was destroyed, however, the Cathedral facade remained undamaged.

On that day United States General Dwight D. Eisenhower publicly announced the Allied armistice with Italy.

After a few days, Field Marshal Kesselring and his military headquarters moved to Soratte Bunker.

Field Marshal Kesselring later wrote in his memoirs about his experience on 8 September. He called it the "day of Italian treason". In fact, the Italians were not present at the German headquarters at the time of the bombing raid. On 3 September 1943 the Italians were alerted by the Allied forces of the bombing raid during their peace talks about their ultimate surrender. These Italian generals and the Savoy royal dignitaries, six days later fled to the port of Ortona, located near Pescara.

The news of the Italian armistice with the Allies reached Frascati at 19:45 on 8 September 1943. The townspeople who, less than 24 hours beforehand had been hiding in bomb shelters, were now fleeing south to escape the occupation of the German Army. The townspeople had no time to clean up debris and bury their dead. As a result, the German armed forces (Wehrmacht) declared the area as an "infected area" and had plans to eliminate the city using flamethrowers. The remaining citizens, however, had found out about the German plan to raze the city, and worked to bury their dead. In total, 485 civilians were victims of the allied raid.

== Order of flight ==
131 USAAF aircraft (B-17G Flying Fortress) carried out a selective-bombing from height altitude because the aircraft were equipped with the modern laying control system "Norden". The order of flight was:

- 1) 99th Bomb Group with n. 32 F.F. B17 - 5,500 m (18,000 feet).
- 2) 301st Bomb Group with n. 36 F.F. B17 - 6,000 m (20,000 feet).
- 3) 97th Bomb Group with n. 35 F.F. B17 - 5,500 m (18,000 feet).
- 4) 2nd Bomb Group with n. 28 F.F. B17 - 6,000 m (20,000 feet).
