= Archaeological area of Poggio Sommavilla =

Archaeological site in Lazio, Italy

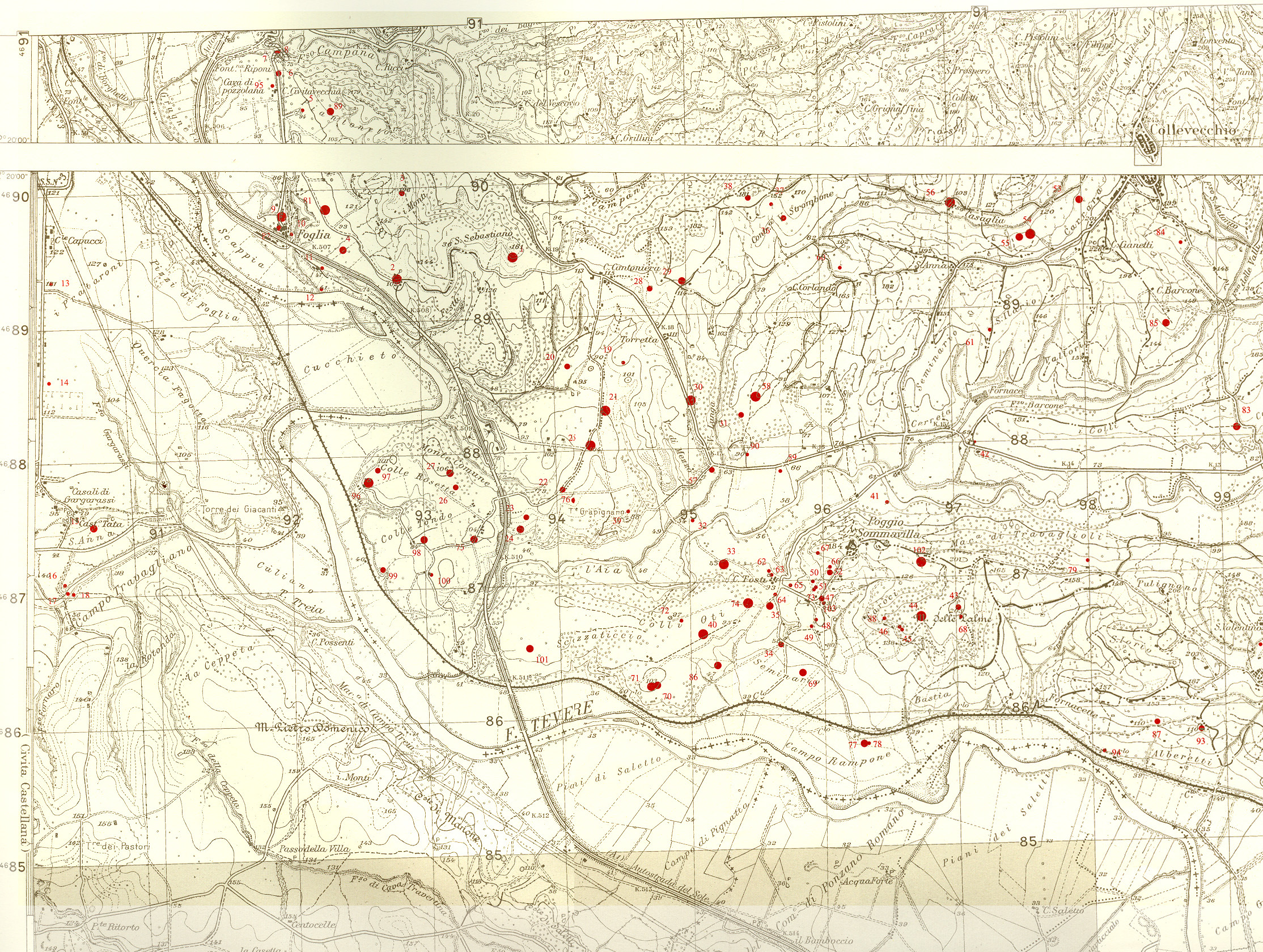
- Archaeological map of the archaic center of Poggio Sommavilla
- Type: Settlement
- Periods: Prehistory, Bronze Age, Iron Age, Archaic
- Location: Comune di Collevecchio
- Region: Lazio

Site notes
- Excavation dates: yes
- Public access: yes

The archaeological area of Poggio Sommavilla is an archaeological site located in Poggio Sommavilla, a Frazione of the Comune of Collevecchio in the Tiber valley.

== History ==
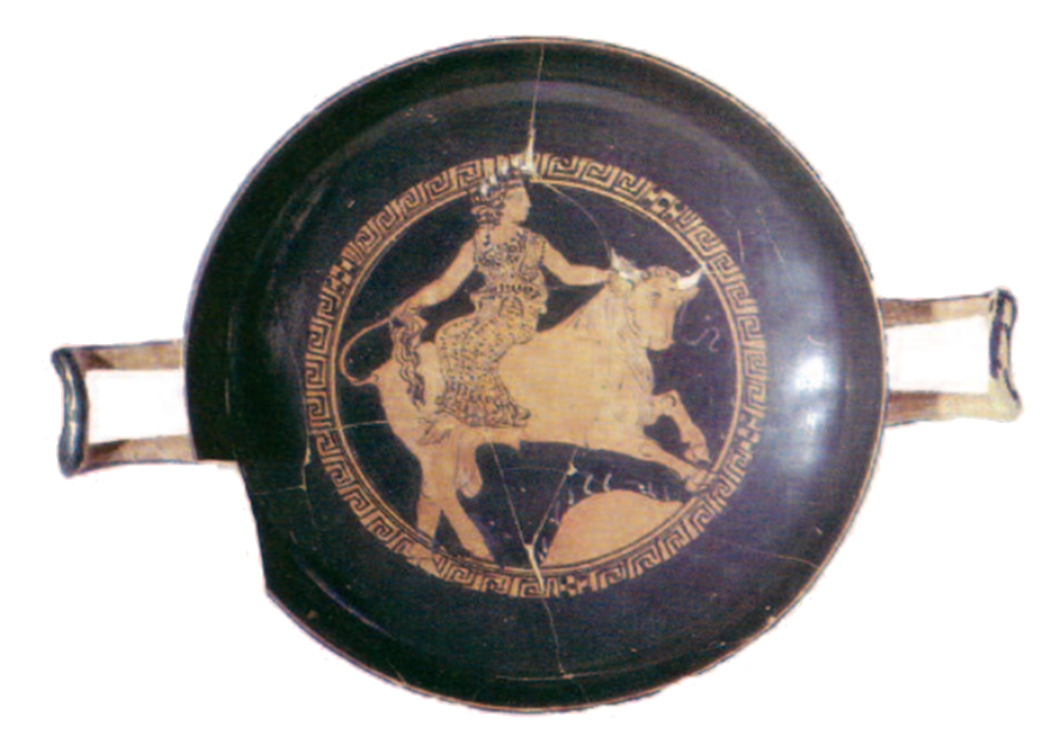
Kylix, red-figure pottery 370 BC depicts the Rape of Europa (Ratto d'Europa), tomb 32 Poggio Sommavilla necropolis, archivio SBALazio Etruria Meridionale.

In the archaeological area of Poggio Sommavilla, archaeological finds from prehistory, the Bronze Age and the Iron Age have been found on the Tiber river terraces. Of greater consistency is the archaic period settlement whose name is not known, according to the studies of the data collected it had life and development at least from the prehistoric age up to the Hellenistic age, probably up to the time of its destruction by of the Roman republican army led by the consular tribune Marcus Furius Camillus of Veii, Capena and Falerii Veteres, cities with which it had intense continuity of relations throughout its cultural history.

=== Prehistoric era ===
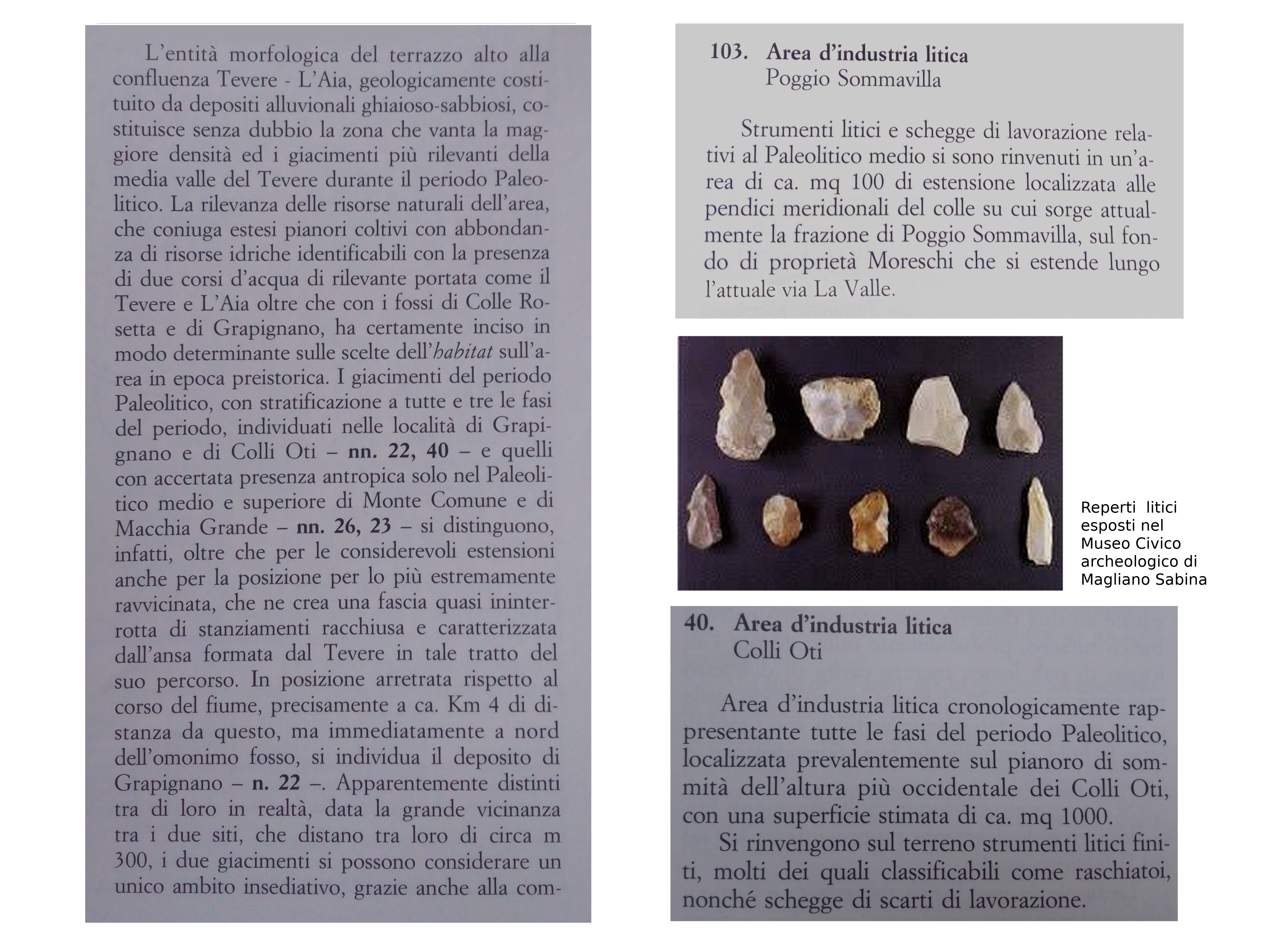
Prehistoric Paleolithic finds of lithic industry, Poggio Sommavilla-Grappignano, Tiber Valley.

The morphological entity of the river terrace of Poggio Sommavilla-Grappignano at the confluence of the Tiber and the Aia torrent in front of the Treja (Paleotevere), geologically made up of gravelly-sandy deposits, undoubtedly constitutes the area that boasts the greatest density and the most relevant deposits of the Tiber valley south of the confluence with the Nera, during Prehistory in the Paleolithic period. The importance of the natural resources of the area, which combines extensive cultivated plains with an abundance of water resources identifiable with the presence of two water courses of significant flow such as the Tiber and L'Aia in front of the Treja river (Paleotevere), as well as with the ditches of Colle Rosetta and Grappignano, it certainly had a decisive impact on habitat choices in prehistoric times. The deposits of the Paleolithic period, with stratification in all three phases of the period, identified in the localities of Grappignano and Colli Oti in Poggio Sommavilla, the lithic industry deposits, can be considered a single settlement area. An area of lithic industry is attested in the Colli Oti of Poggio Sommavilla, chronologically representing all the phases of the Paleolithic, located mainly on the plateau at the top of the westernmost hill of the Colli Oti, with an estimated surface area of approx. 1000 m2. Finished lithic tools are found on the ground, many of which can be classified as scrapers, spearheads, arrows, processing matrices, as well as splinters of processing waste. Lithic tools and processing flakes relating to the Middle Paleolithic have been found in an area of approx. 100 m^{2} of extension located on the southern slopes of the hill on which the historic center of Poggio Sommavilla currently stands, on the land Fondo Moreschi, which extends along the current Via La Valle.

== Museum ==
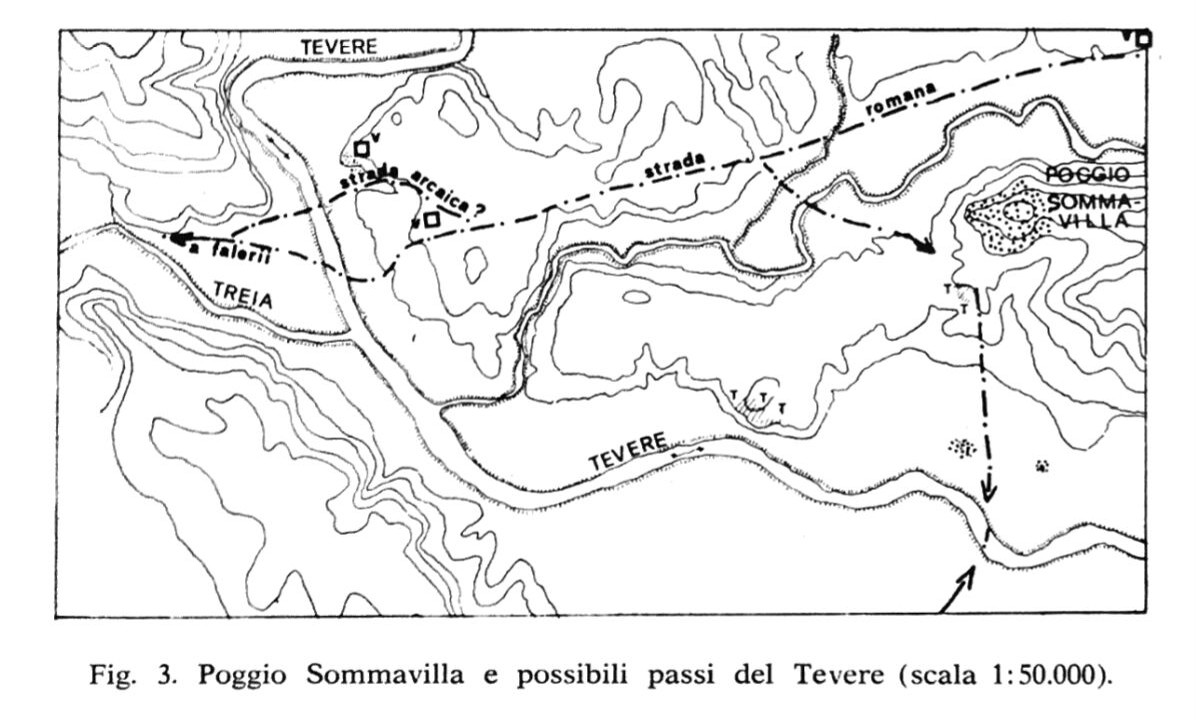
Poggio Sommavilla archaic and the possible steps of the Tiber, (Quaderni di archeologia etrusco italica) Stefania Q. Gigli

Most of the finds are preserved in Civic archaeological museum of Magliano Sabina, at the National Etruscan Museum of Villa Giulia in Rome and at the National Archaeological Museum of Florence in Rieti and in many parts of the world, some are preserved in the Museum of Fine Arts in Boston including the Fiaschetta di Poggio Sommavilla and at the Ny Carlsberg Glyptotek Museum in Copenhagen. Two red-figure chalice kraters are on display at the Archaeological Museum of Parma.

== Fiaschetta di Poggio Sommavilla ==
Fiaschetta pendaglio amuleto of Poggio Sommavilla is a small brown body vase with an inscription from the 7th century BC. belonged to a woman, and found in 1895 in the funerary objects of Tomb III in the Necropolis of the archaic center of Poggio Sommavilla.

== Fantastic Bestiary ==
From the fantastic animals engraved in the finds of the necropolis of the archaic center of Poggio Sommavilla, very close analogies emerge with the materials from the Capenate and Faliscan areas. With these we discuss clear contacts with Etruscan ceramics, geometric ceramics - dating back to an older phase - and contemporary Etruscan-Corinthian ceramics: common elements appear both in the choice of subjects and in the rendering of the zoomorphic friezes. Tomb 3 of Poggio Sommavilla released a grave goods characterized by decorative plant units and attributable to a single local workshop, equiniform figures prevail, similar ones were found on ollas in the Giglio necropolis of Magliano.

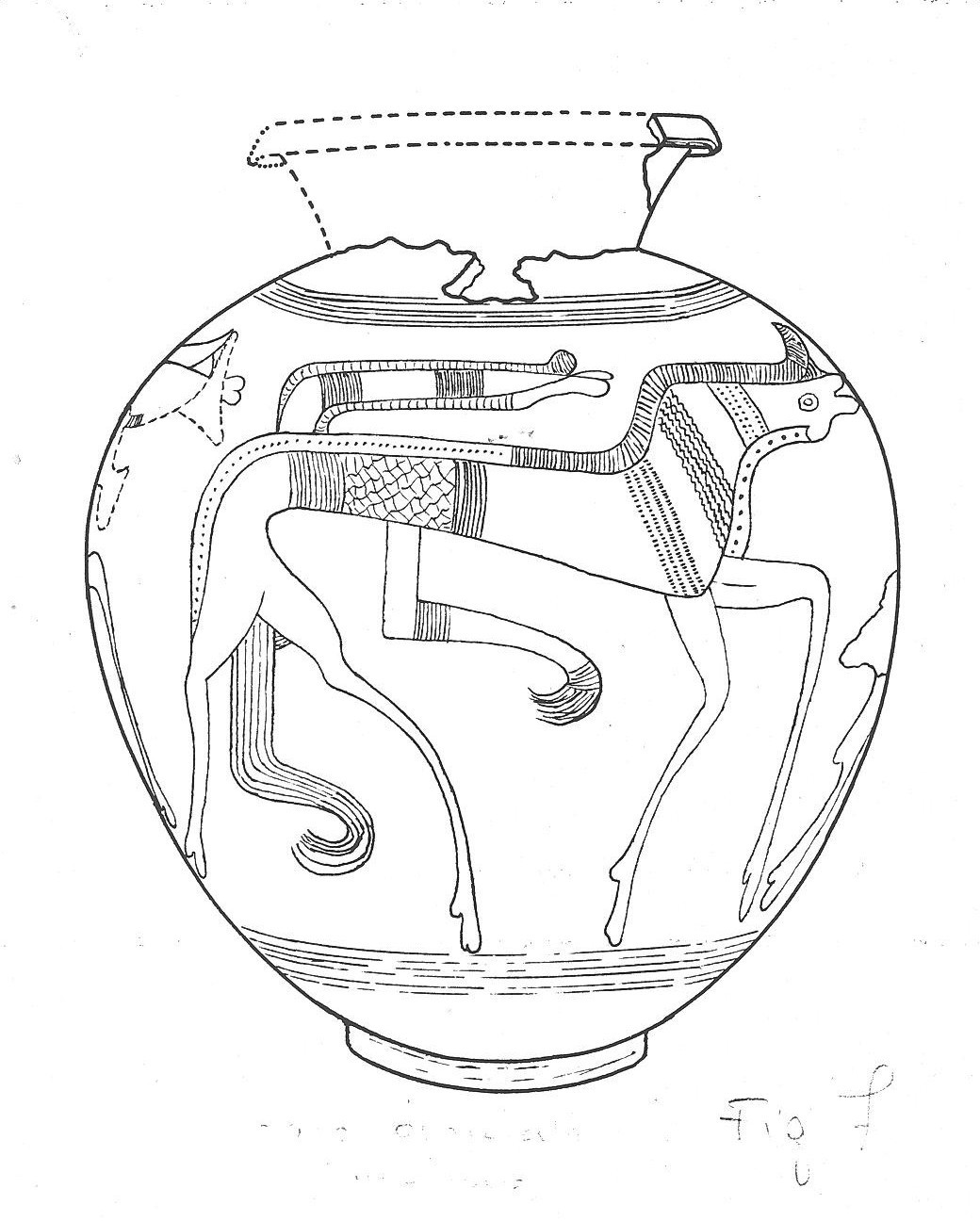
1 chimera equina, tomba III necropoli of Poggio Sommavilla scavi 1895, Salskov Robert 1974

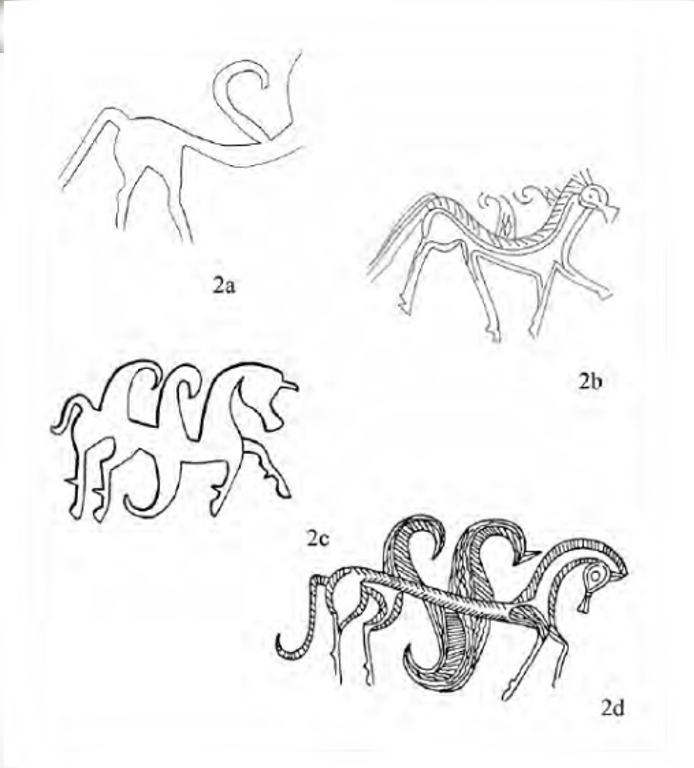
2 equide alato, necropoli of Poggio Sommavilla scavi del 1895. point 2 Biella 2007a - 2b Archivio Soprintendenza Archeologica Toscana - 2c 2d Magda Cantu'

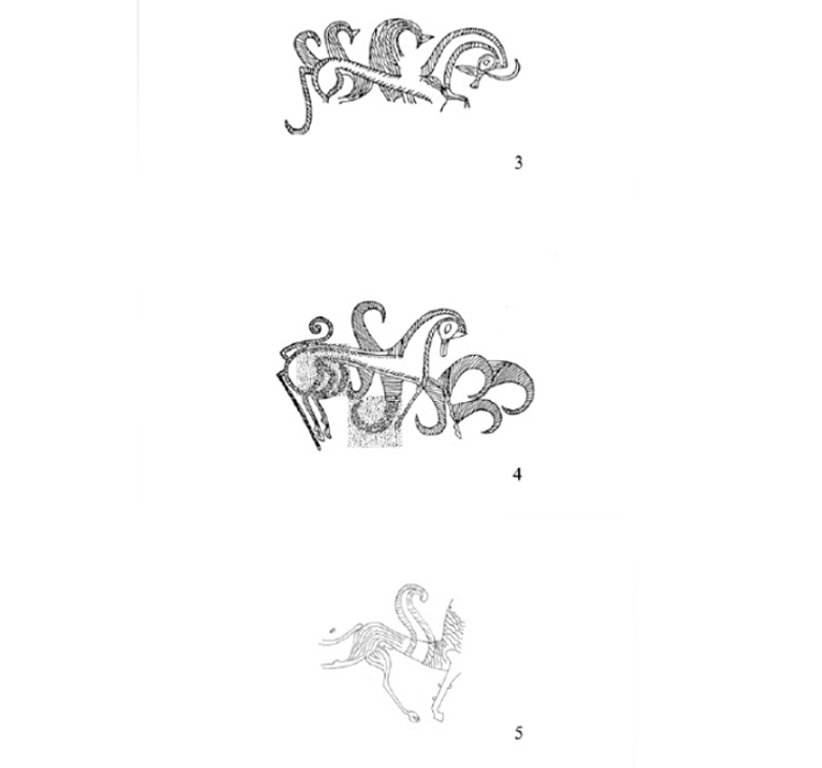
3 equide caprino, 4 equide felino, 5 leone alato equide, necropoli of Poggio Sommavilla scavi del 1895. Point 3, 4 Magda Cantu' - 5 Archivio Soprintendenza Archeologica Toscana

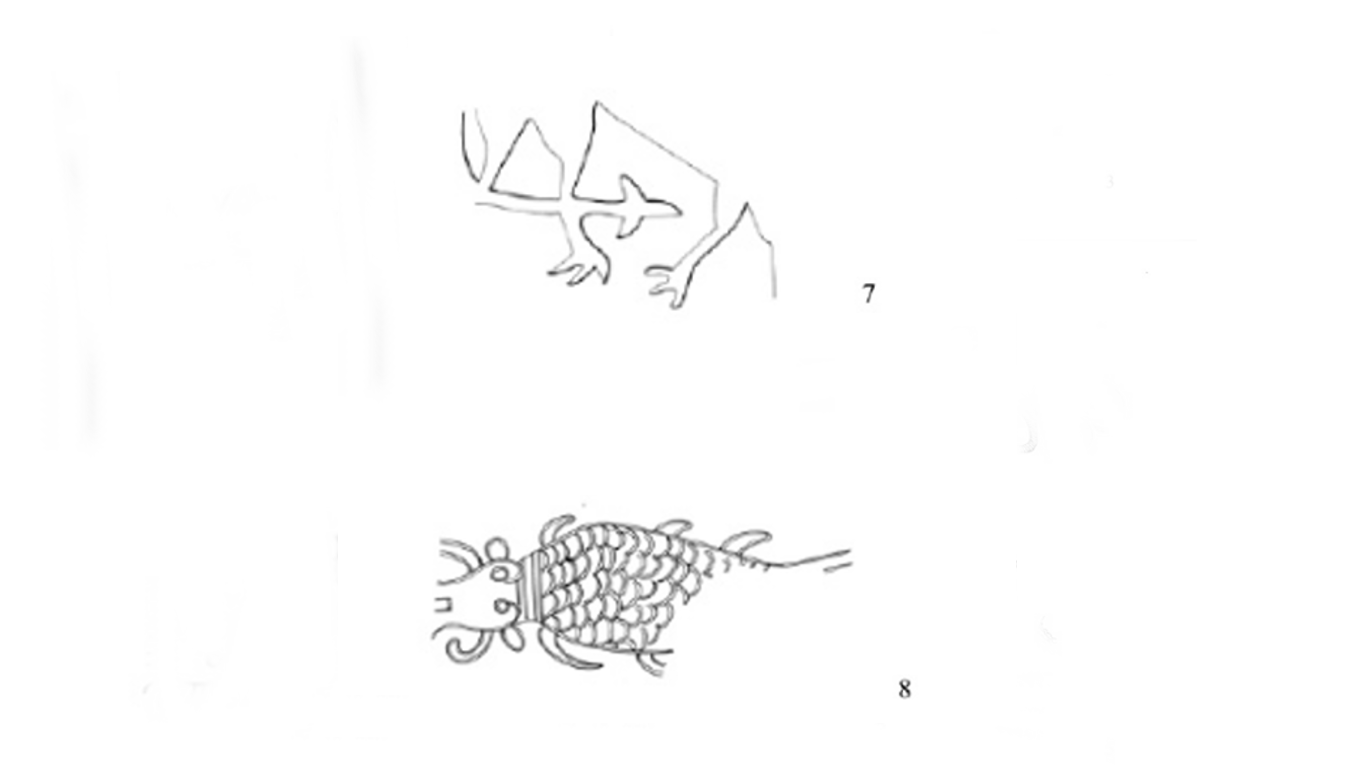
7 equide felino, 8 pesce serpente tauriforme, necropoli of Poggio Sommavilla scavi del 1895. Point Magda Cantù - Archivio Soprintendenza Archeologica Toscana

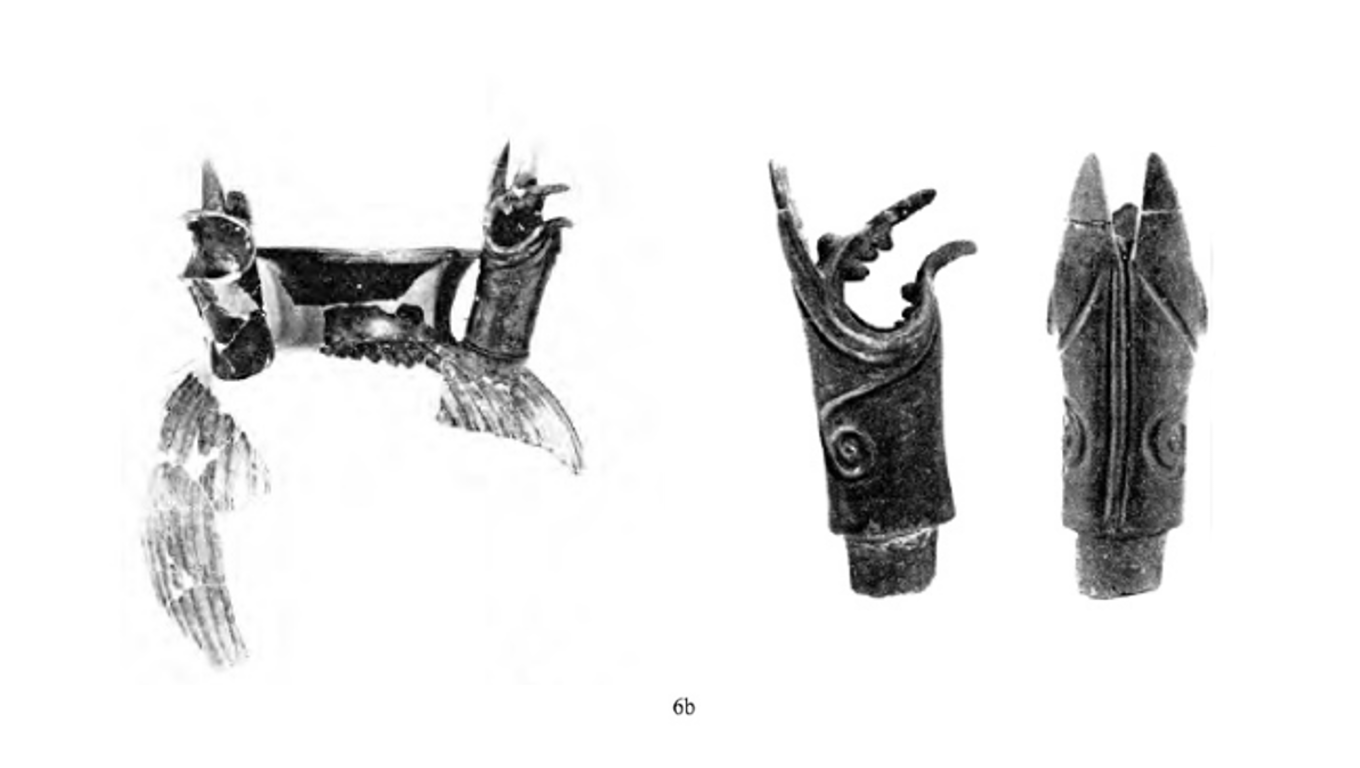
Olla 6b equide grifoide, necropoli of Poggio Sommavilla scavi del 1895, Cristofani - Martelli 1977

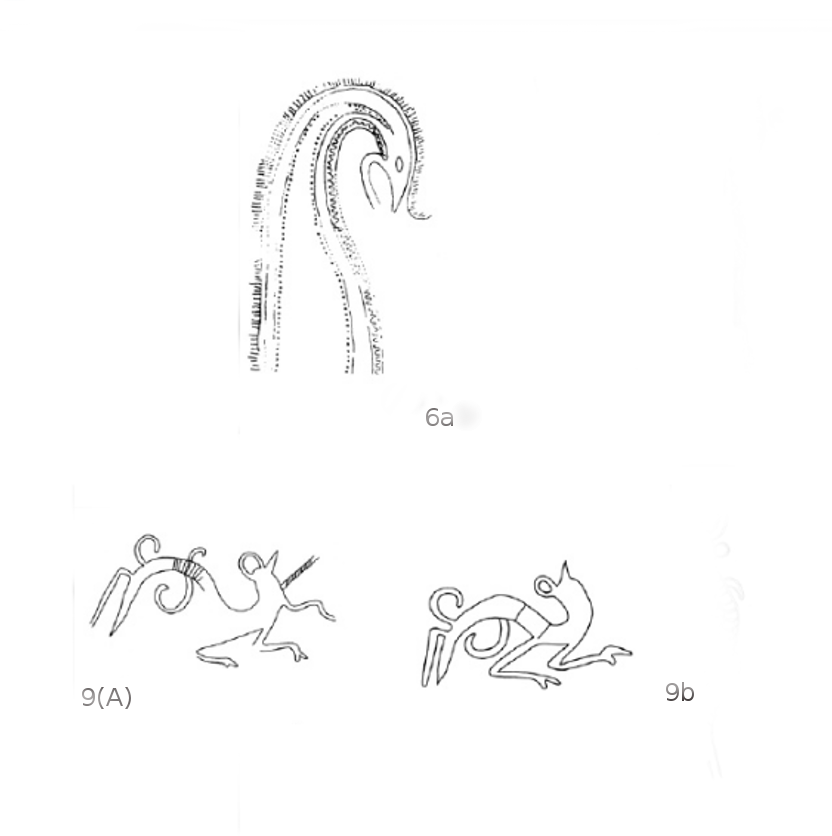
Animale alato fantastico non identificato 9A 9b excisione su Olla tomba II VI a.C. necropoli of Poggio Sommavilla, 6a ippogrifo necropoli del Giglio

== Gallery ==
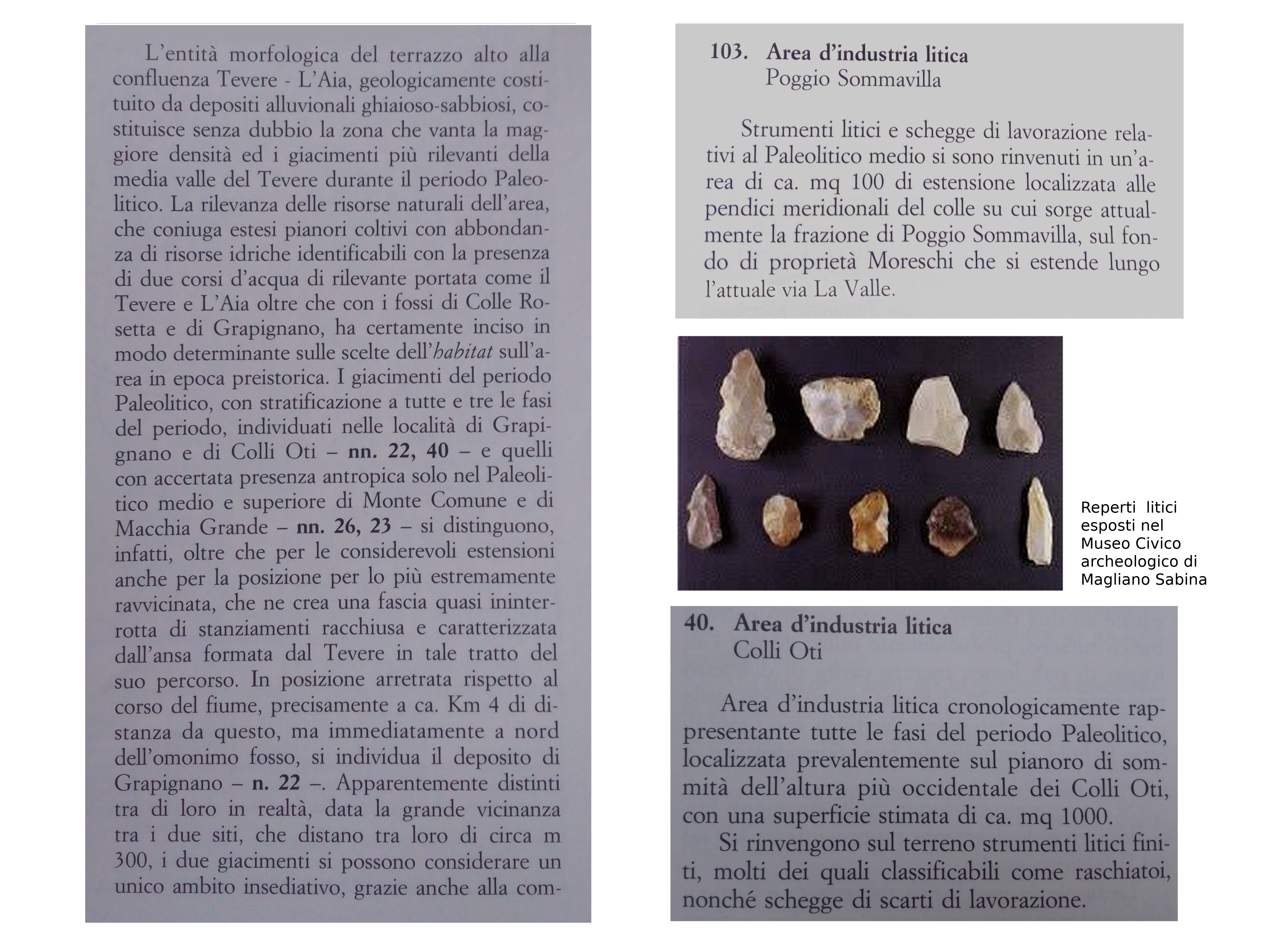
Prehistoric Paleolithic finds of lithic industry, Poggio Sommavilla-Grappignano, Tiber Valley

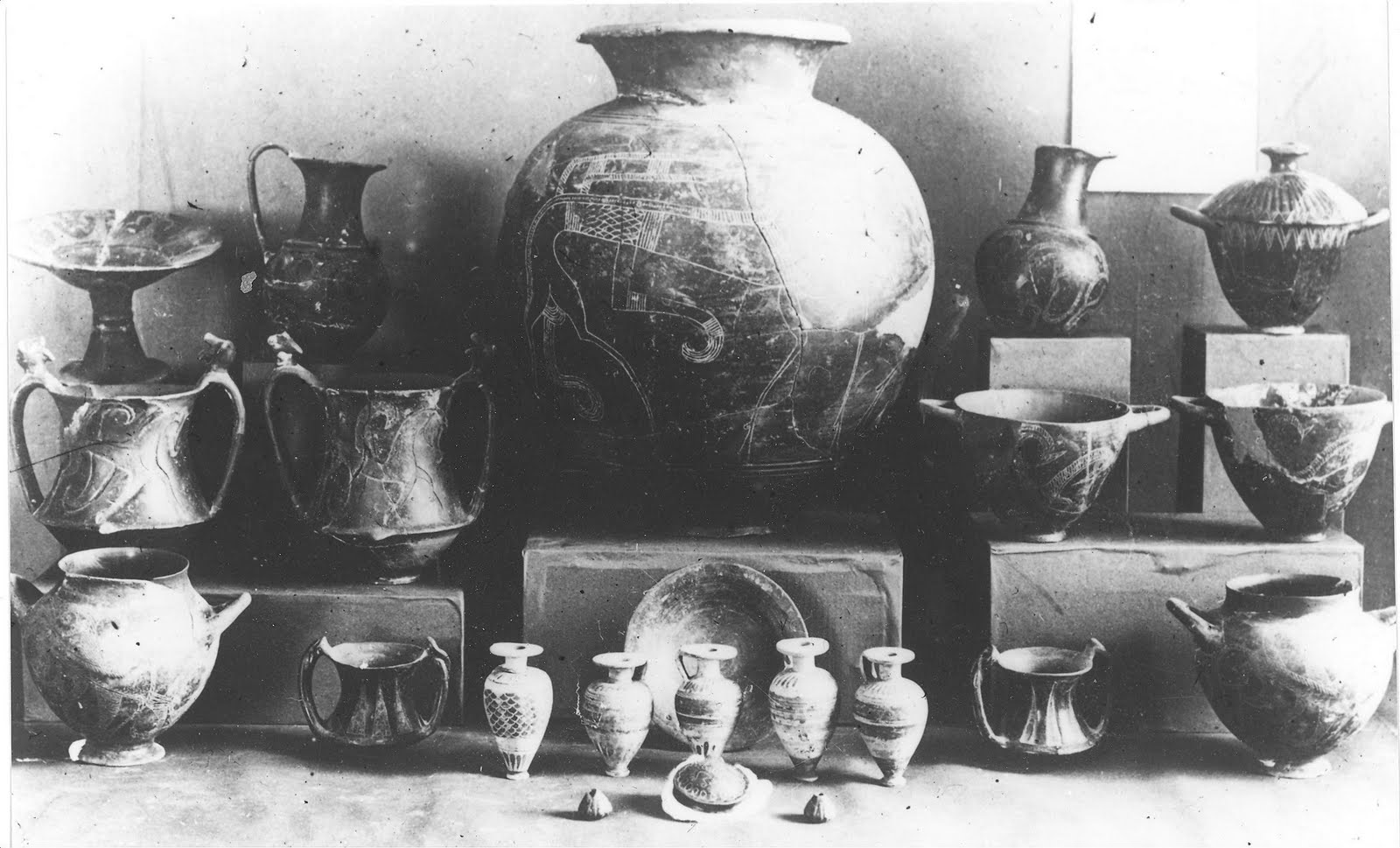
Tomb kit III Necropolis of Poggio Sommavilla, excavations of 1896.

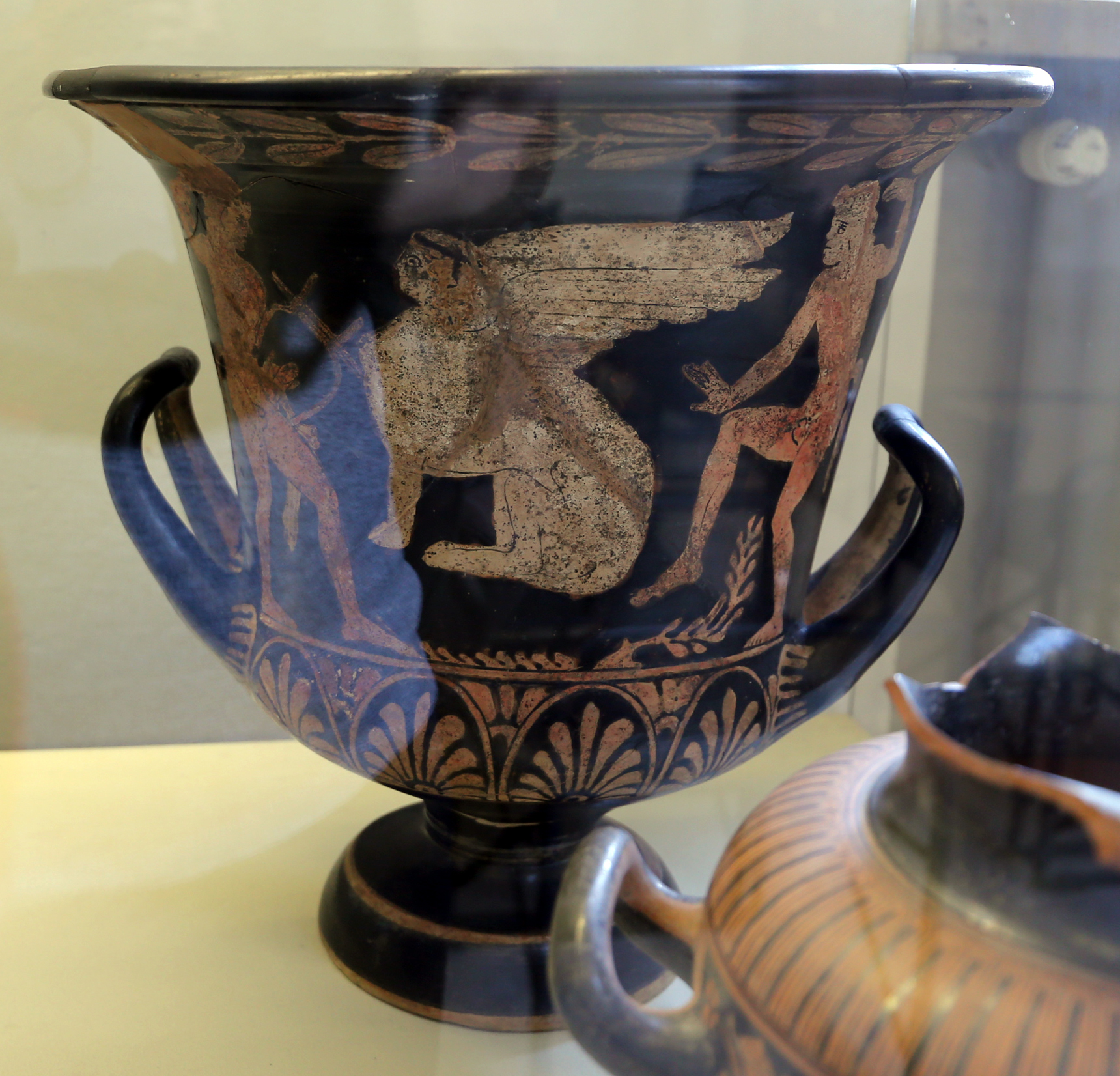
Red-figure chalice krater, sphinx among satyrs dancing and playing the lyre, 5th century. B.C. tomb V necropolis of Poggio Sommavilla, Archaeological Museum of Parma

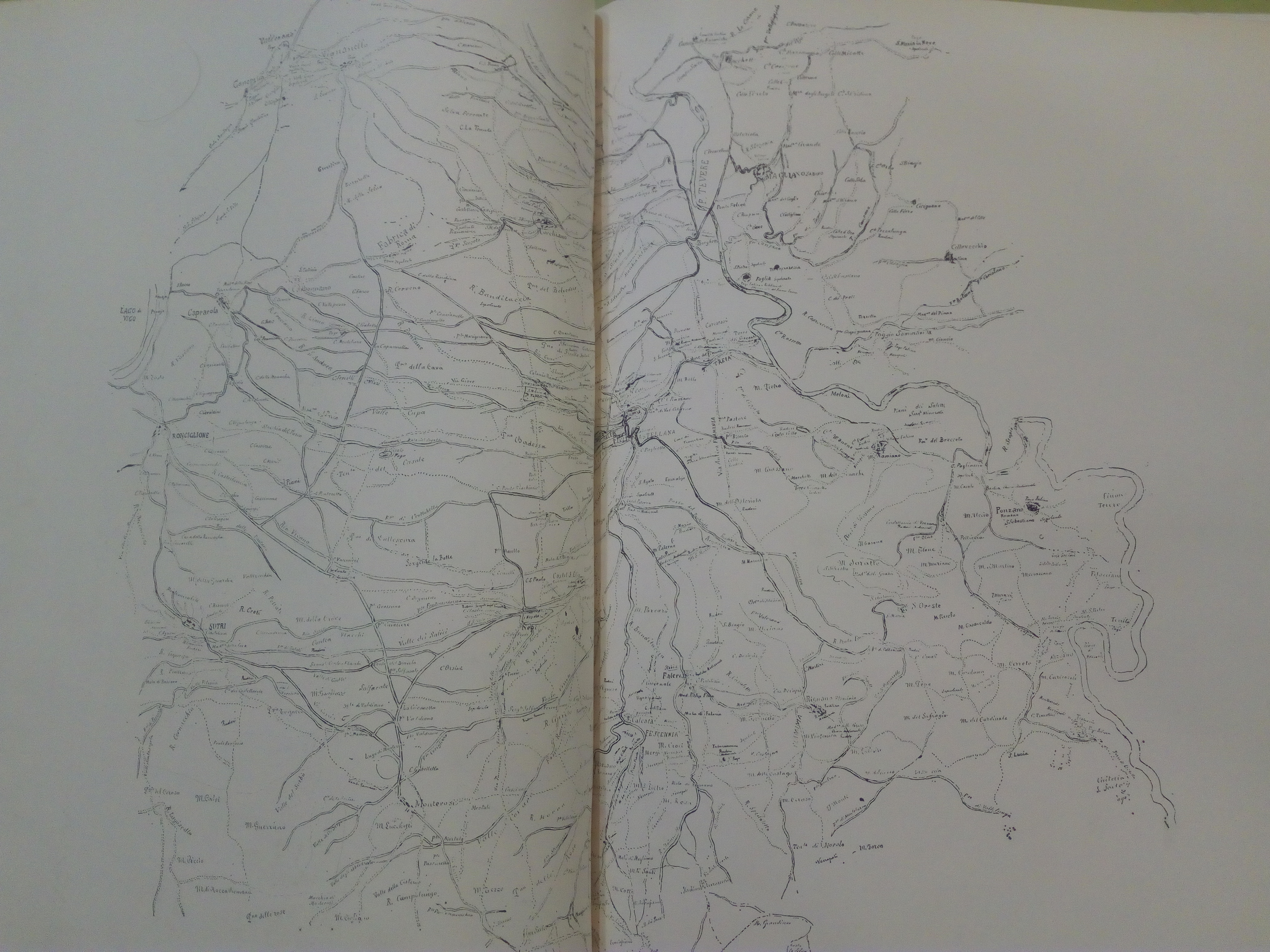
Archaeological map - Falerii e la sua regione rivelata dai sepolcreti, Mancinelli Scotti Francesco - Biblioteca Comunale Civita Castellana.

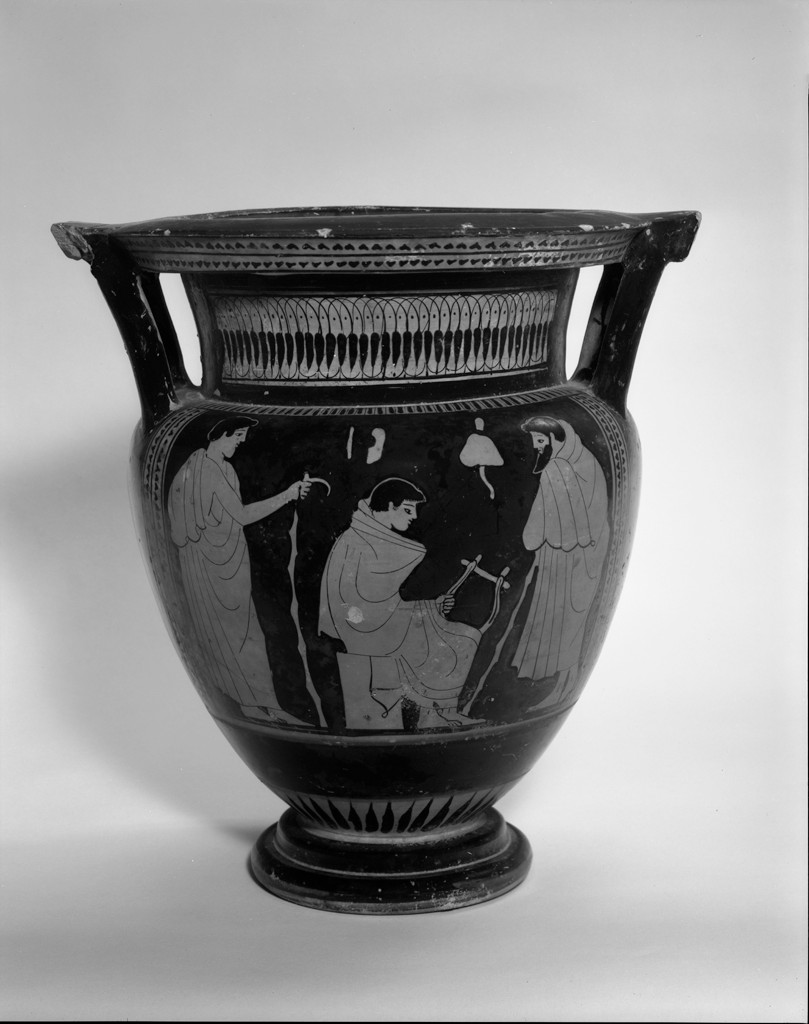
Column krater, red-figure pottery, musicians with zither, tomb IV 490-470 BC Poggio Sommavilla necropolis, Harvard Art Museums - Fogg Art Museum - United States of America.

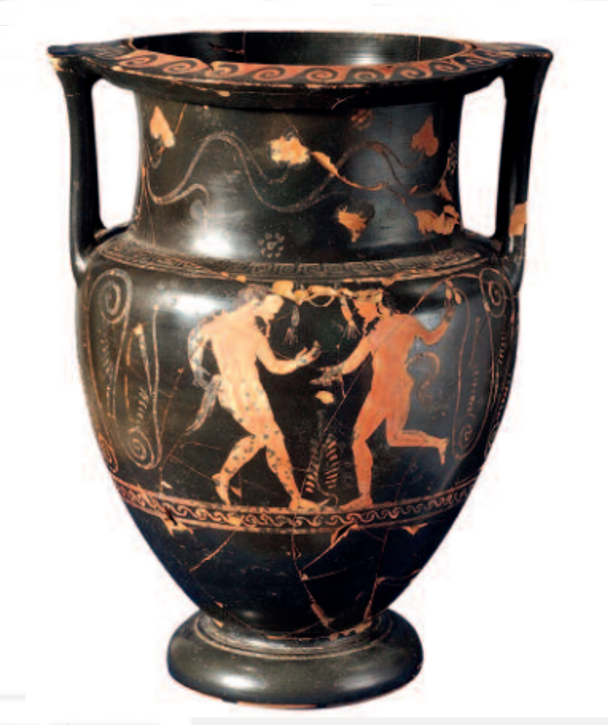
Column krater, red-figure pottery, satyr dances 375-350 BC, tomb 32, Poggio Sommavilla necropolis, SBALazio, southern Etruria.

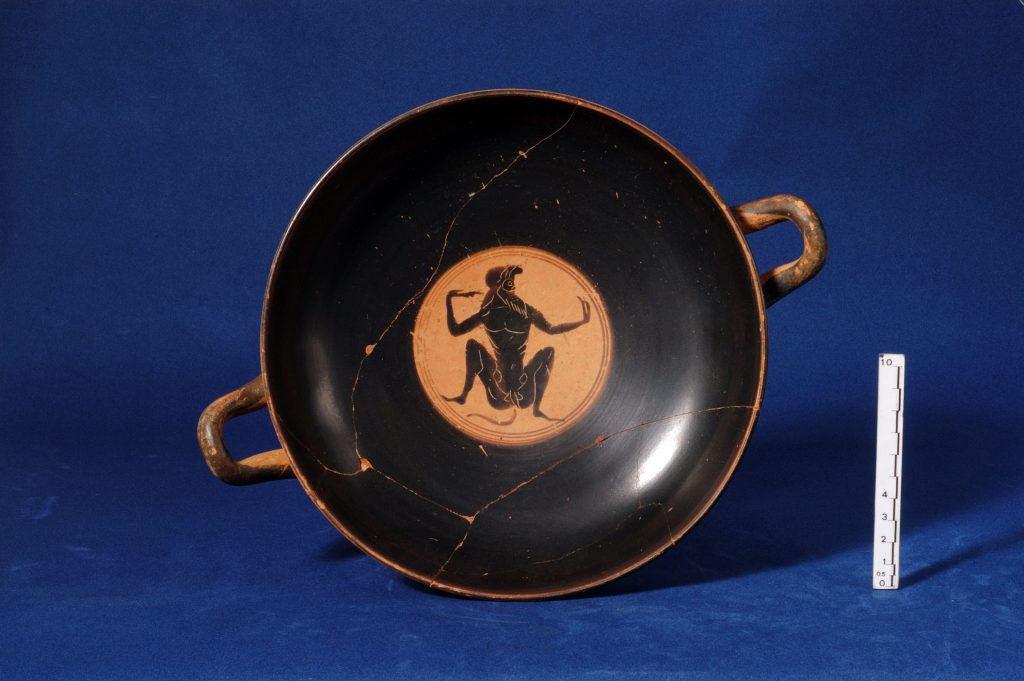
Kylix with big eyes decorated with a Satyr in the centre, Necropolis of Poggio Sommavilla, Tomb 43.

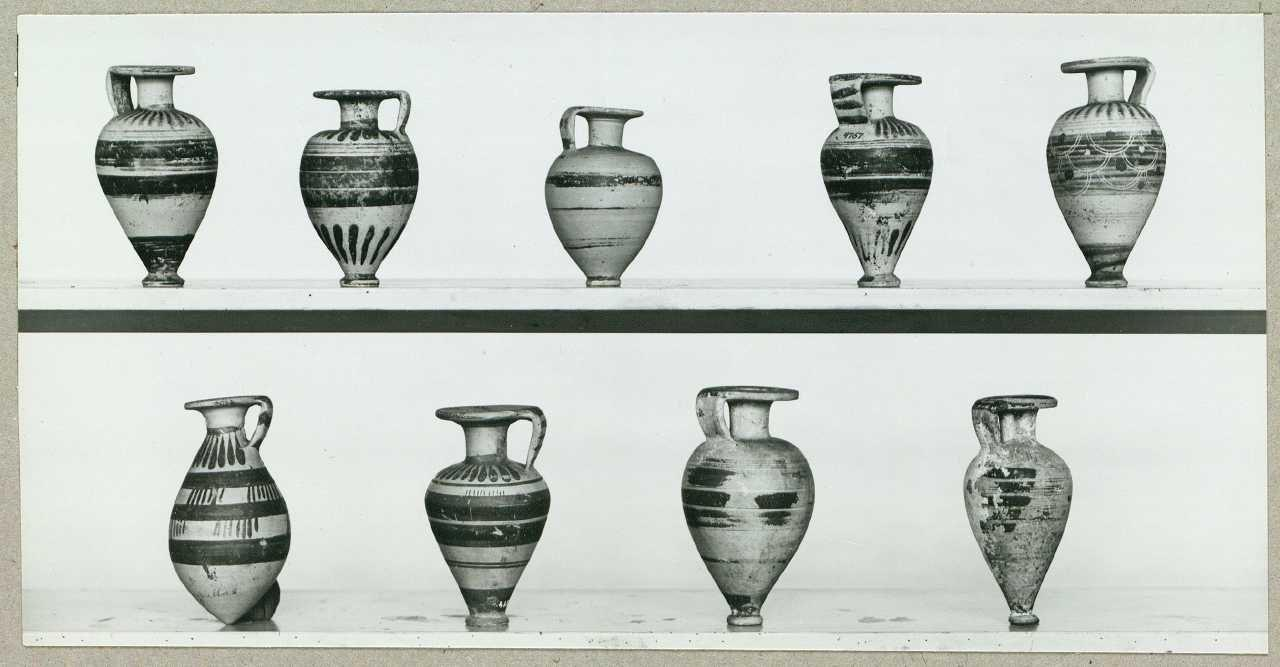
Decorated aryballos, Etruscan Corinthian pottery, Necropolis of Poggio Sommavilla excavations of 1896, National Museum of Denmark.

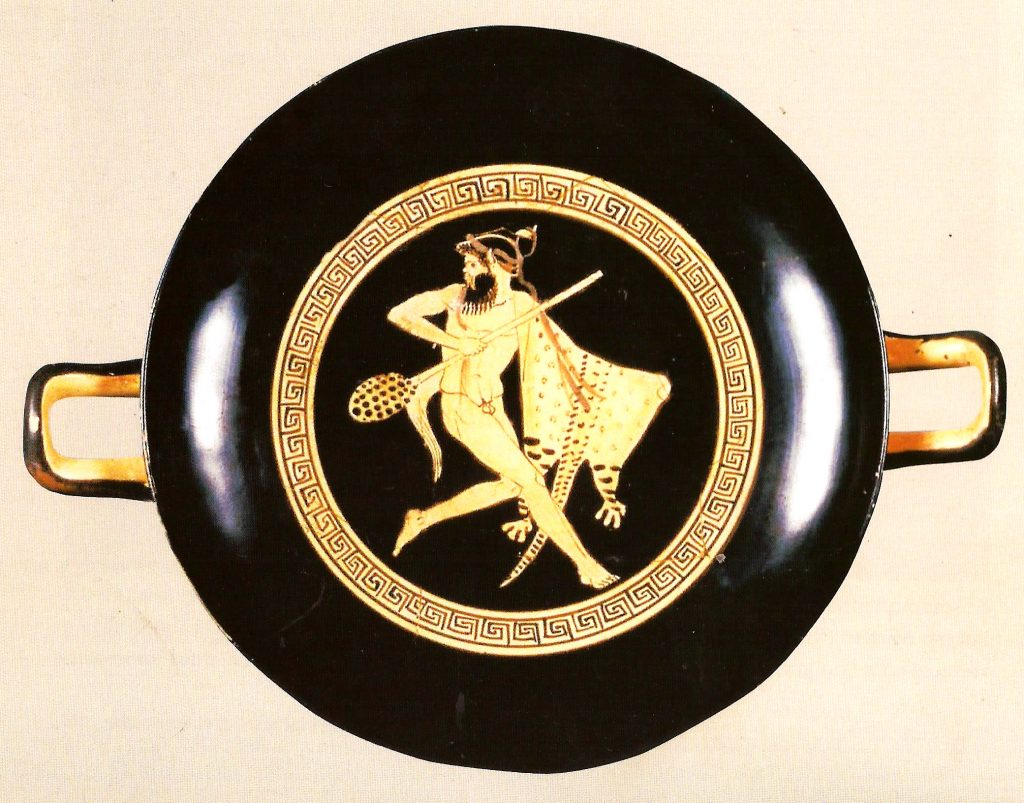
Red-figure kylix, Satyr with leopard skin and Thyrsus V a. C. tomb 48, Necropolis of Poggio Sommavilla.

Kantharos with stylized horse engraved on brown body ceramic, excavations of 1896, Necropolis of Poggio Sommavilla.

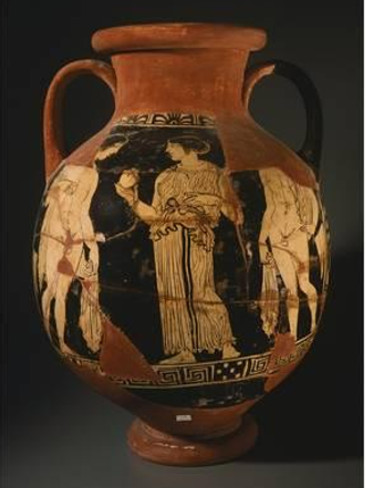
Red-figure pelike with female figures observing a pomegranate, attributed to the Sommavilla Painter of the 5th century BC. Etruscan Museum "Caludio Faina" Orvieto.

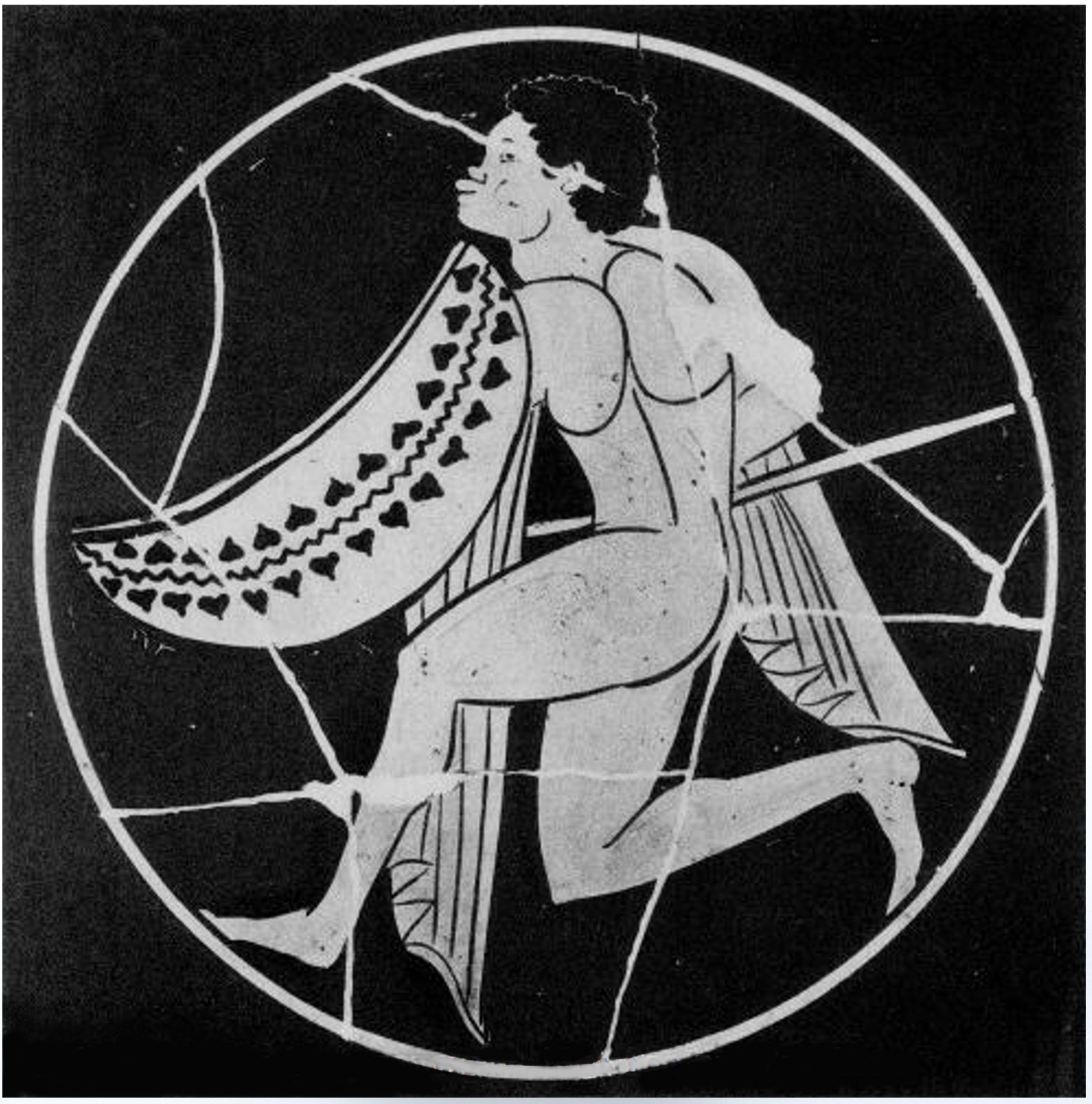
Red-figure kylix, medallion with armed Nero VI BC Tomb II Necropolis of Poggio Sommavilla, Louvre Paris.

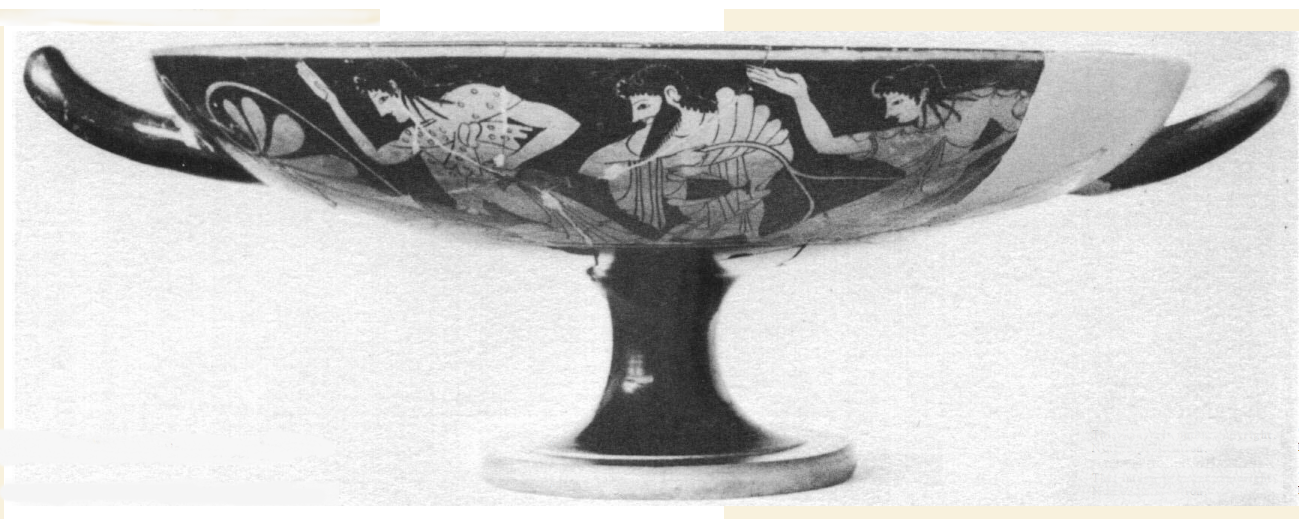
Kylix, red-figure ceramic, Leopard Panther, 525-475 BC Poggio Sommavilla necropolis, Musée du Louvre.

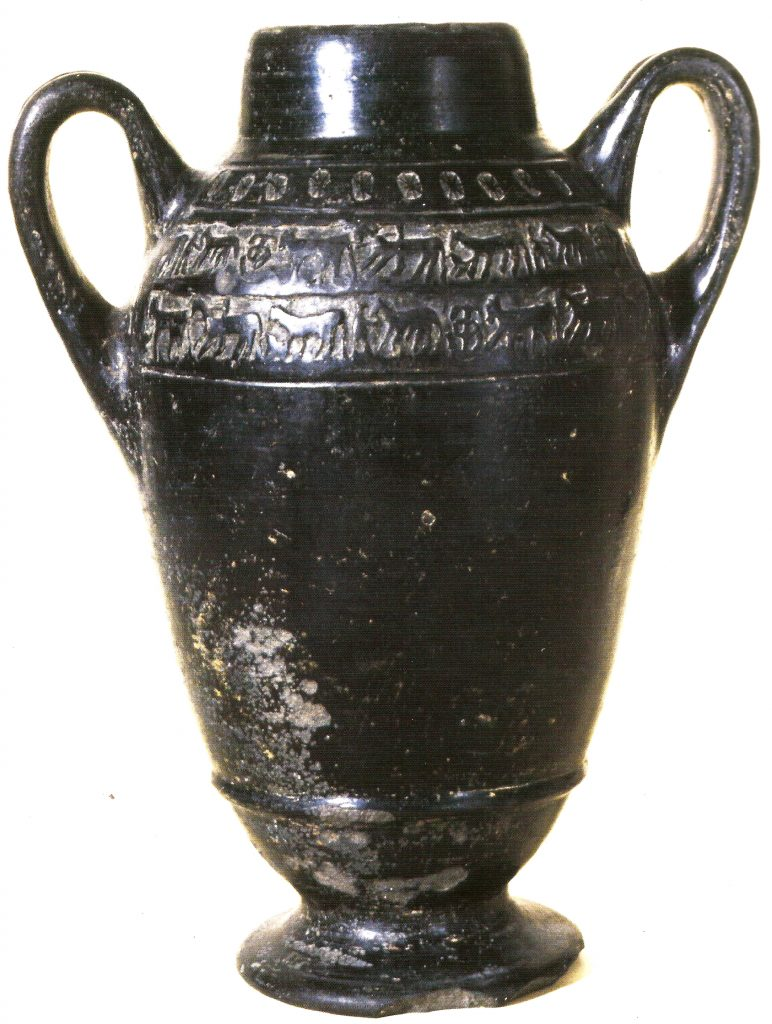
Bucchero amphora with reliefs of horses of "Sommavillana" production 6th century BC. C. tomb 32 Necropolis of Poggio Sommavilla.

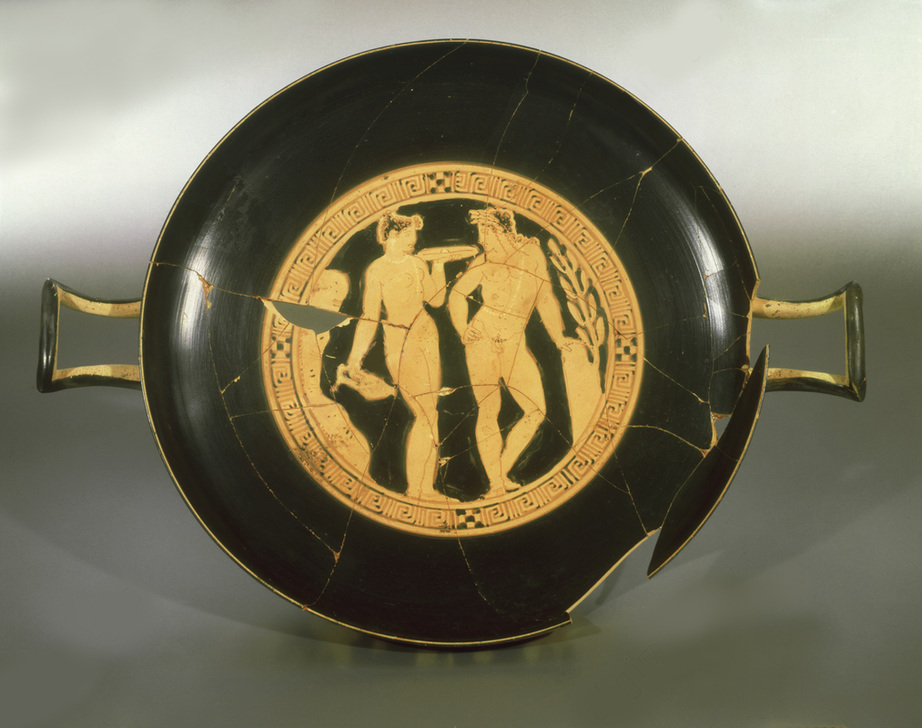
Red-figure kylix, female male pair 6th BC tomb 48 Necropolis of Poggio Sommavilla, SBALazio Etruria meridionale, Roma.

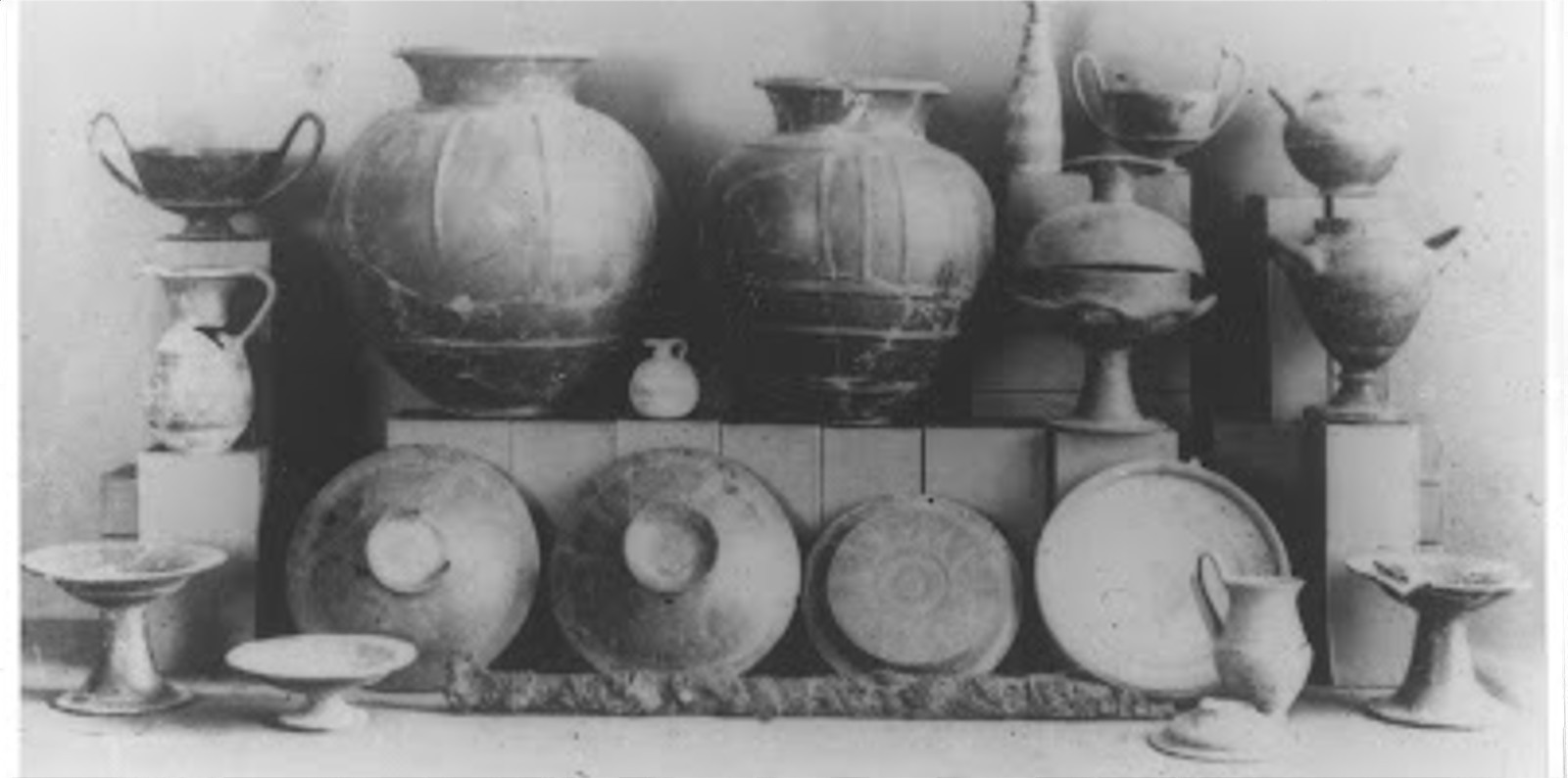
Tomb kit The Necropolis of Poggio Sommavilla, excavations of 1896

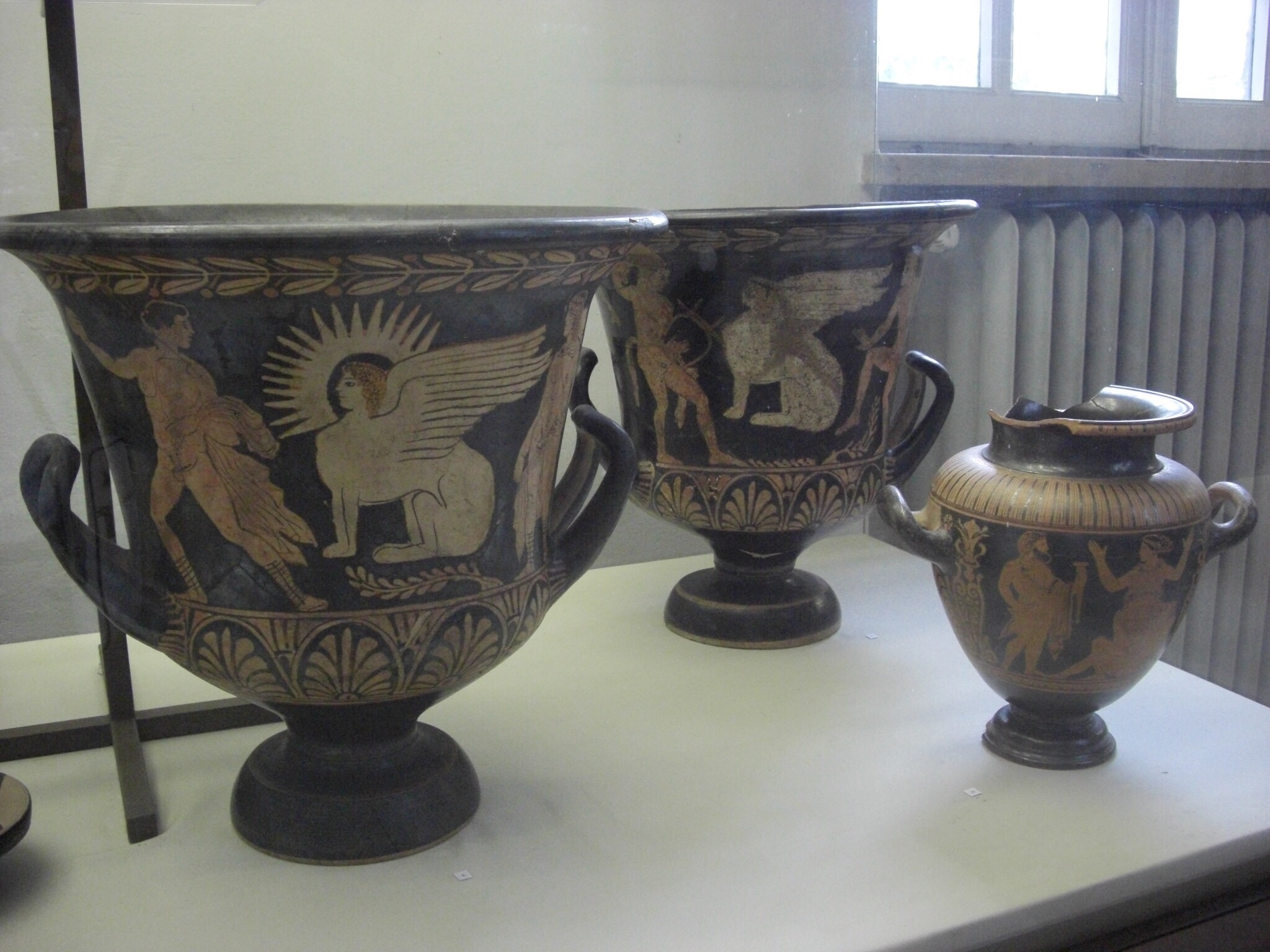
Red-figure craters 5th BC tomb V necropolis of Poggio Sommavilla Archaeological Museum of Parma

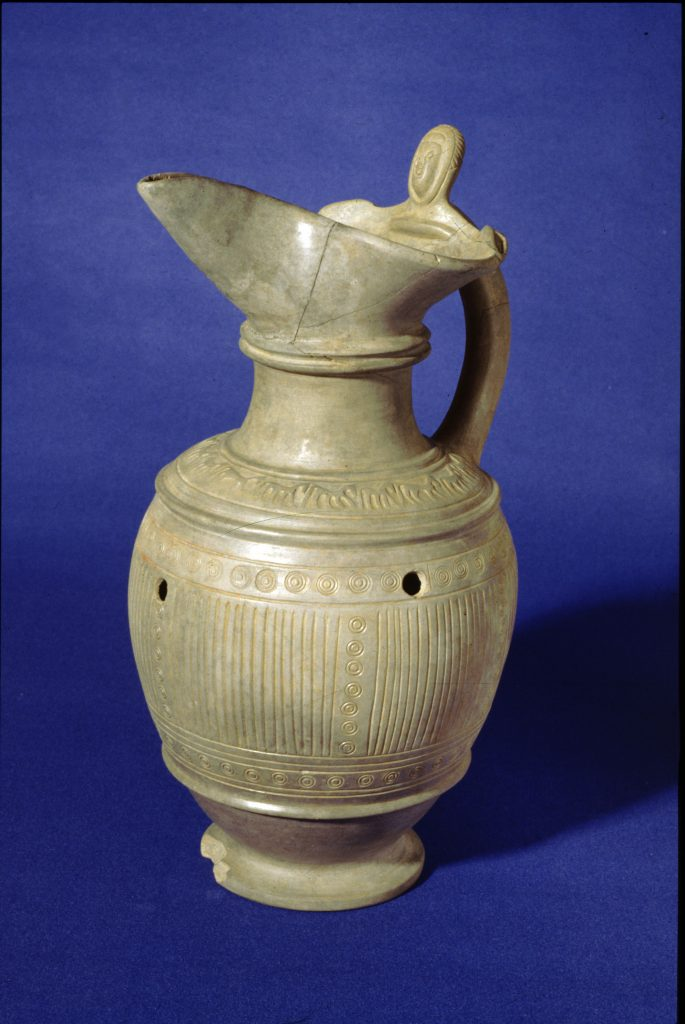
Oinochoe with gray body, with equine decorations 6th century. BC Tomb 48, Poggio Sommavilla Necropolis.

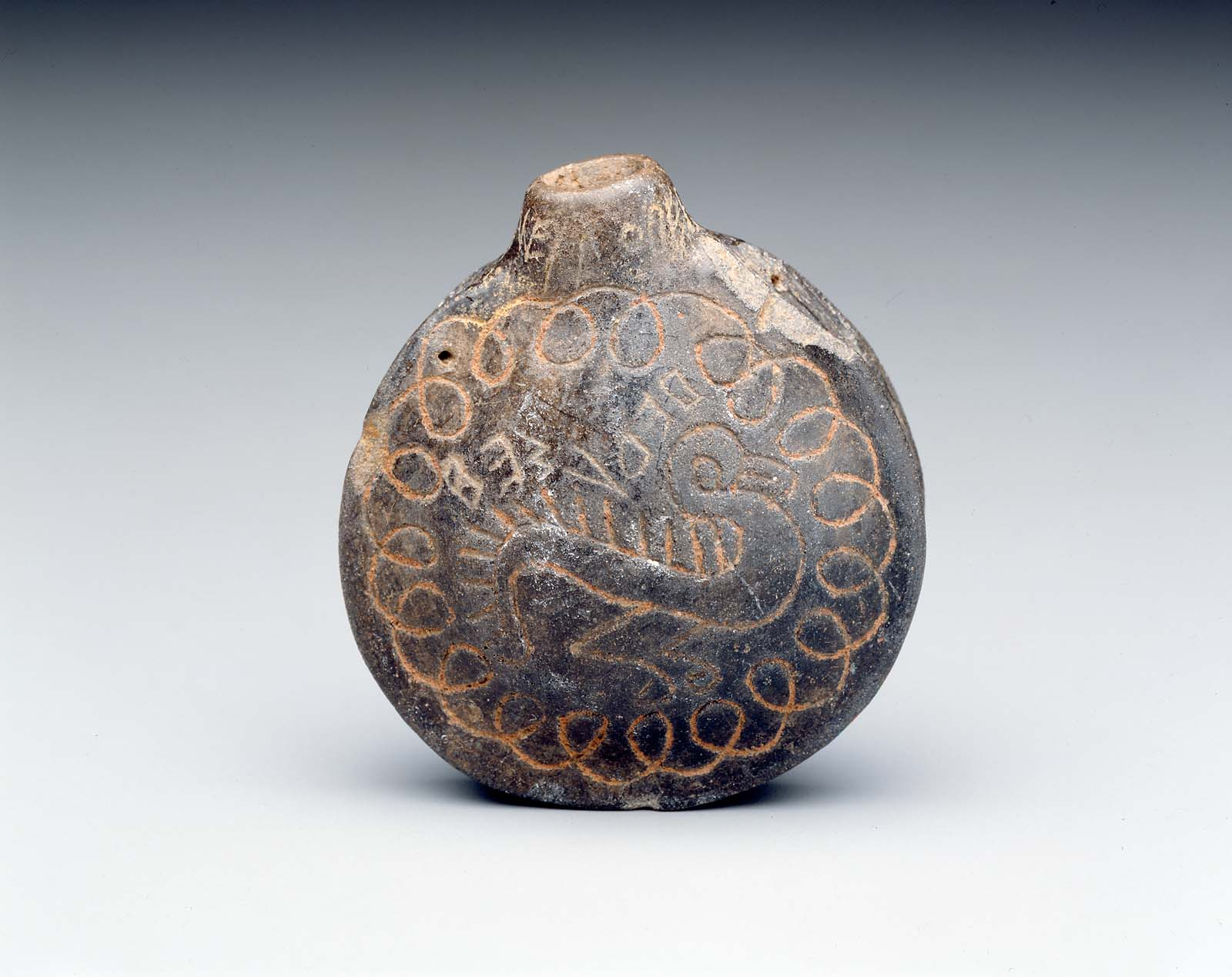
Fiaschetta pendaglio amuleto 7th century BC with inscription, necropolis of Poggio Sommavilla, tomb III, side A.

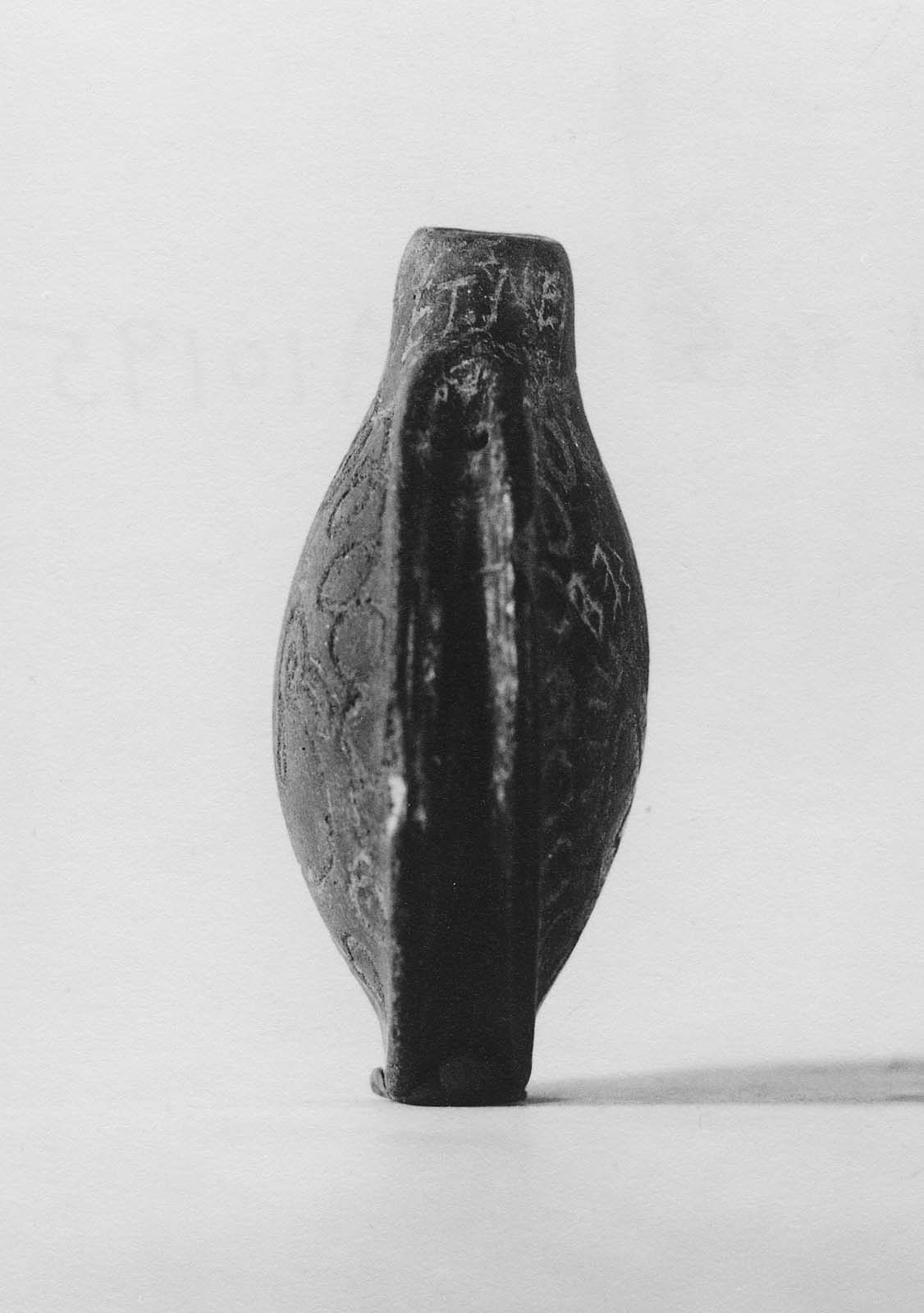
Fiaschetta pendaglio amuleto 7th century BC with inscription, Poggio Sommavilla necropolis, tomb III, profile.

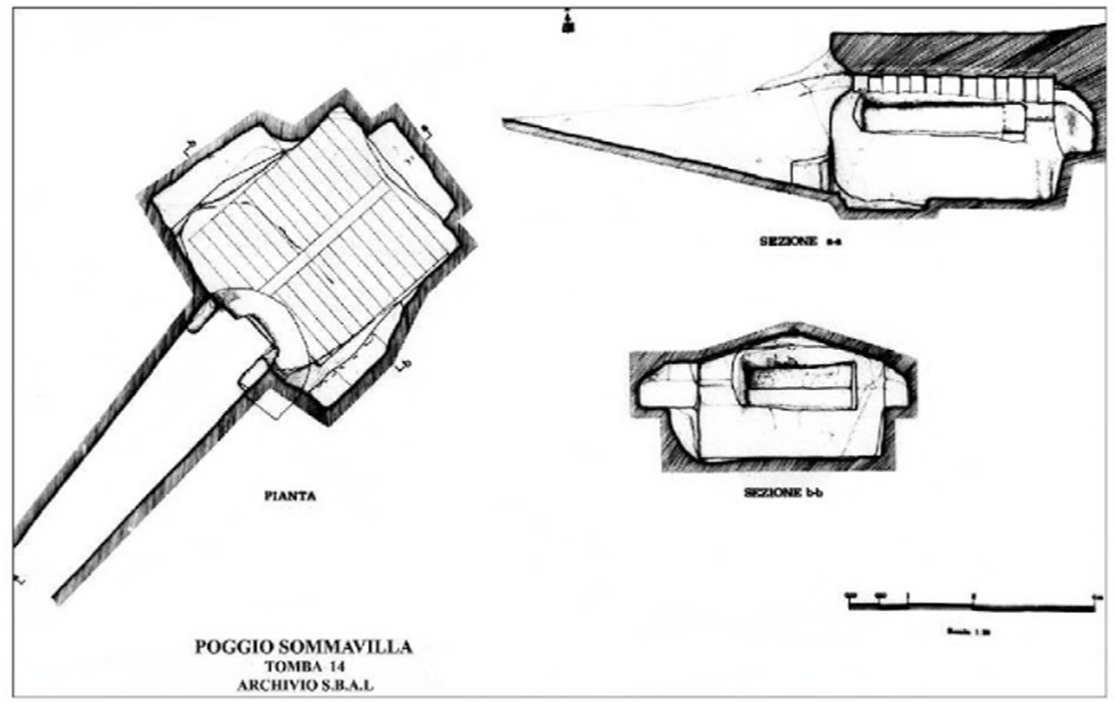
Tomb 14 necropolis of Poggio Sommavilla, section and plan on paper, archivio SBALazio Etruria meridionale.

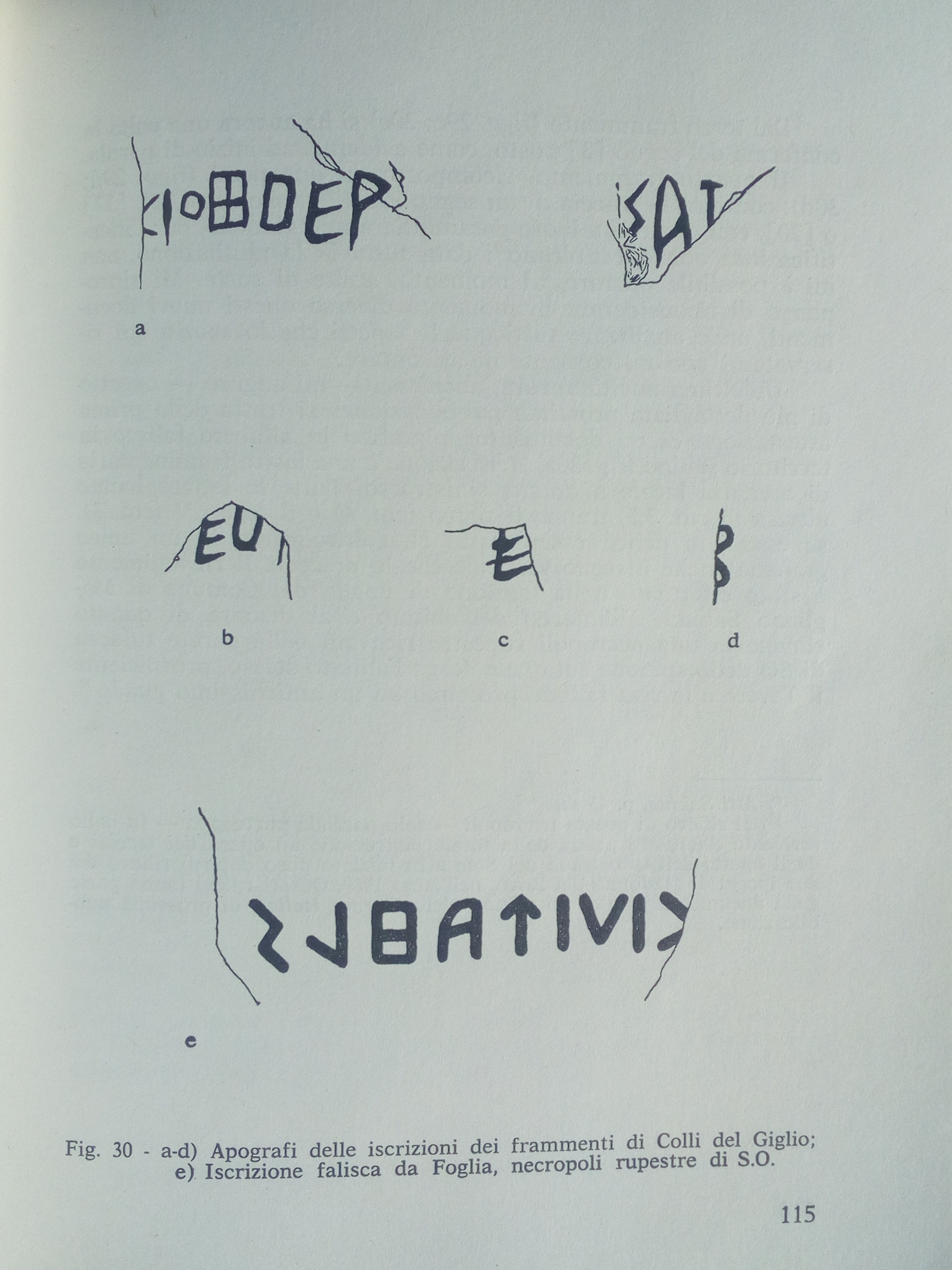
Inscription in Faliscan language, rock necropolis of Foglia, Tiber Valley

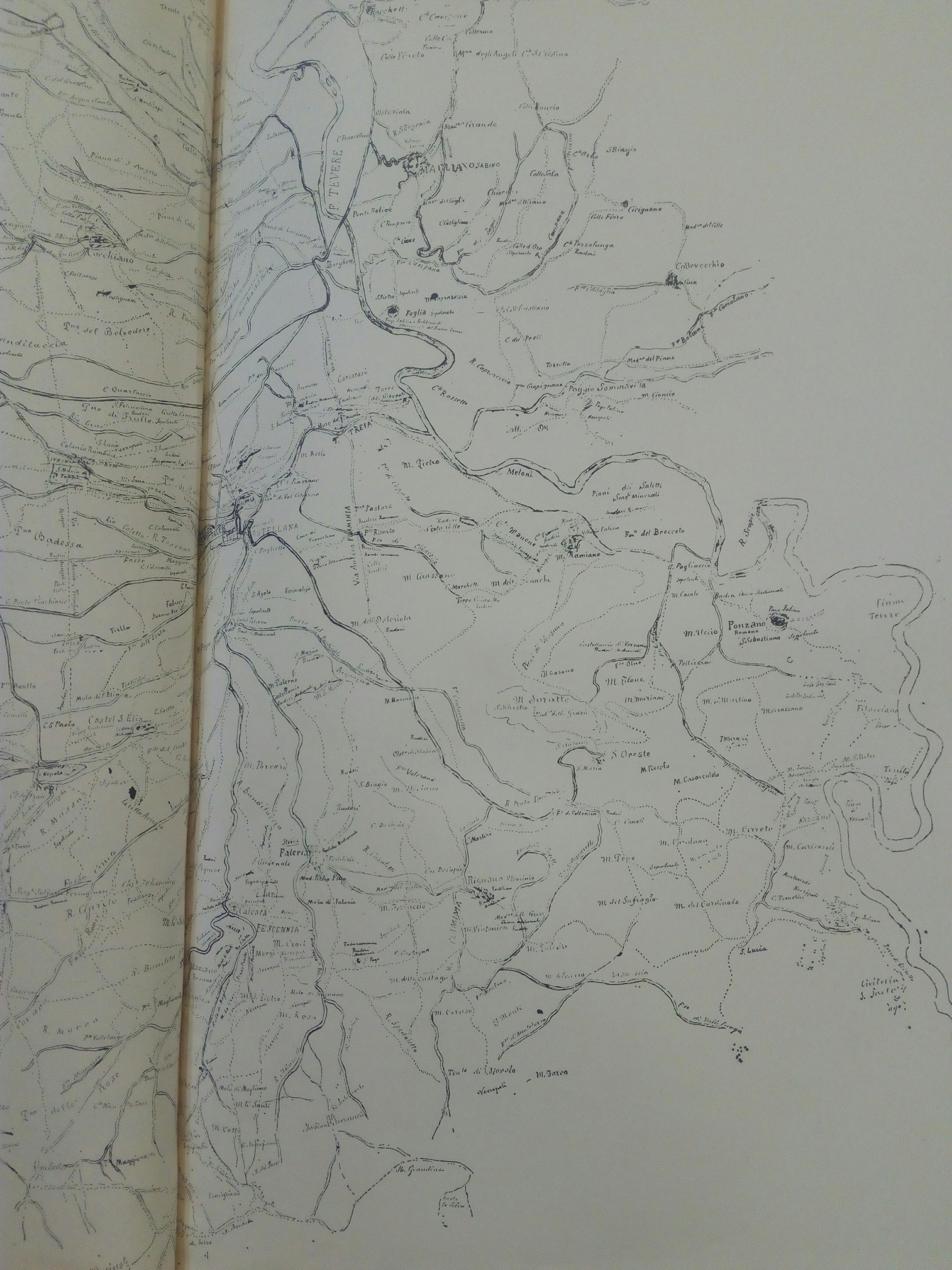
Archaeological map - Falerii e la sua regione rivelata dai sepolcreti, Mancinelli Scotti Francesco - Biblioteca Comunale Civita Castellana.

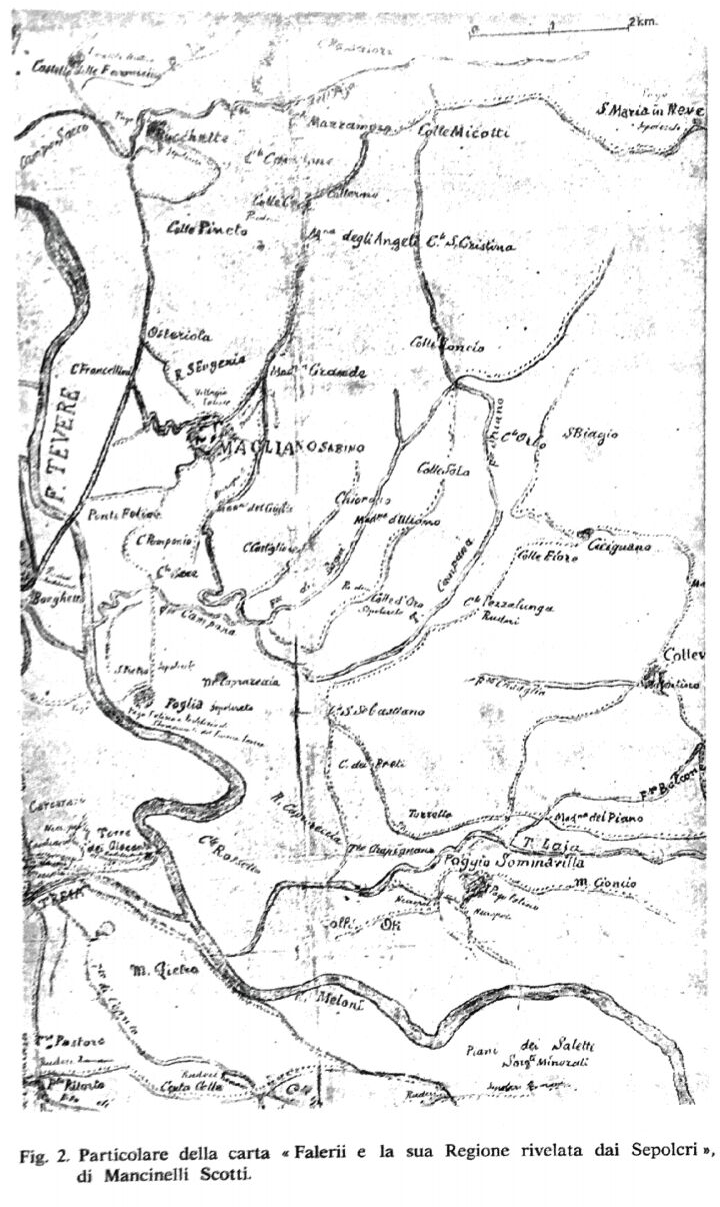
Falerii e la sua regione rivelata dai sepolcreti, archaeological map by Mancinelli Scotti.

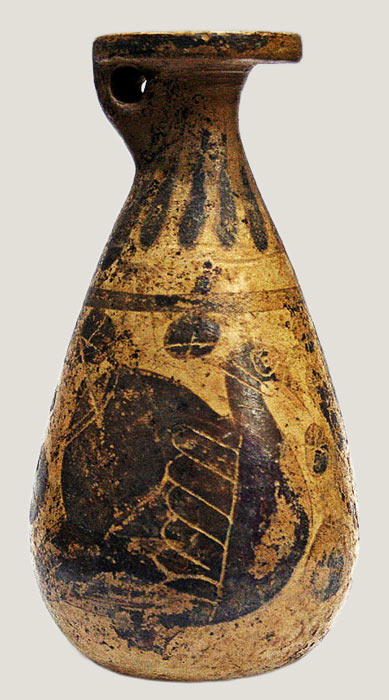
Alabastron with swans, Etruscan Corinthian ceramic Necropolis of Poggio Sommavilla.

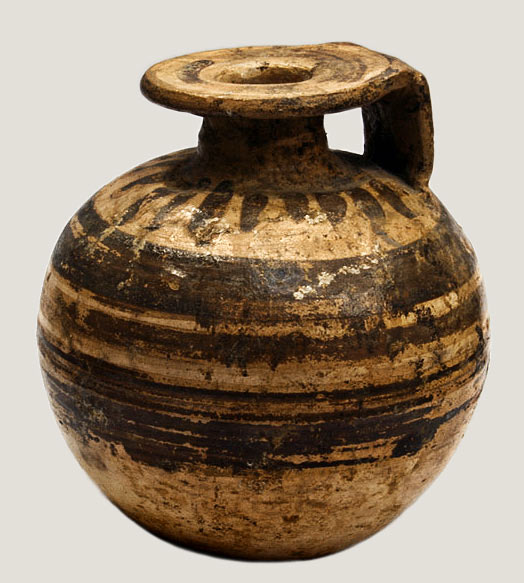
Globular aryballos, Etruscan Corinthian ceramic, Poggio Sommavilla necropolis.

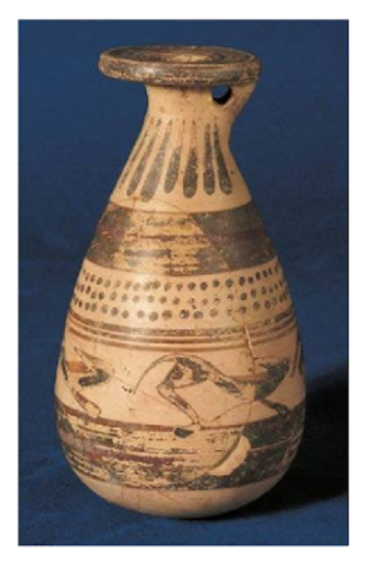
Alabastron, Etruscan Corinthian ceramic, running dogs, tomb 27 Poggio Sommavilla necropolis, archivio SBALazio Etruria Meridionale.

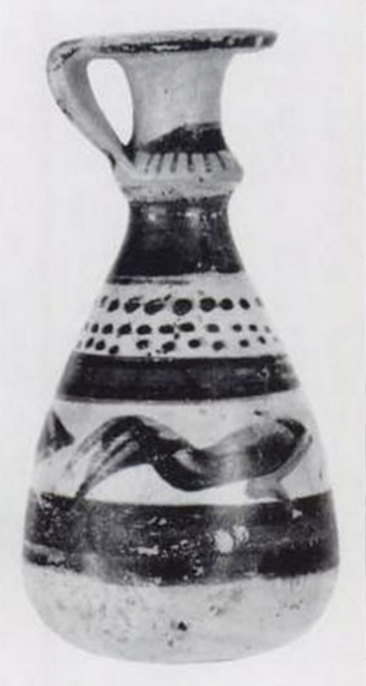
Alabastron, Etruscan-Corinthian ceramic motif of running dogs, Poggio Sommavilla necropolis Archaeological Museum Florence.

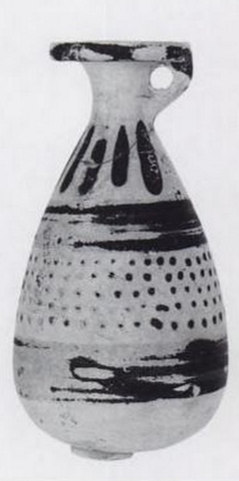
Alabastron, Etruscan-Corinthian ceramics, Poggio Sommavilla necropolis, Archaeological Museum of Florence.

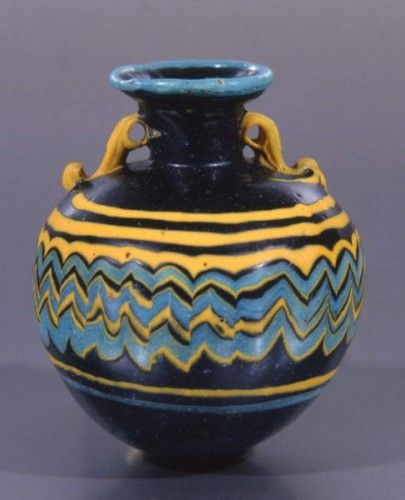
Glass paste aryballos, Etruscan Museum of Villa Giulia, Rome.

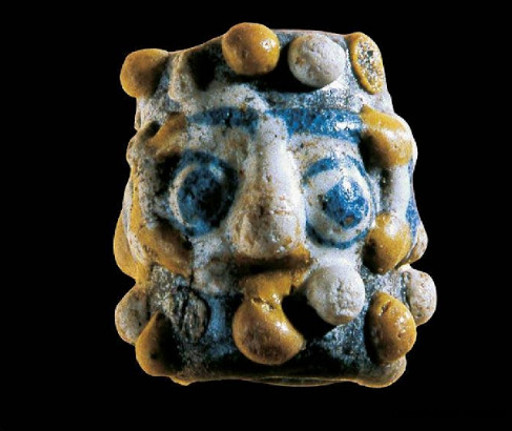
Glass paste necklace, tomb 1, 4th BC Necropolis of Poggio Sommavilla, archivio SBALazio Etruria meridionale.

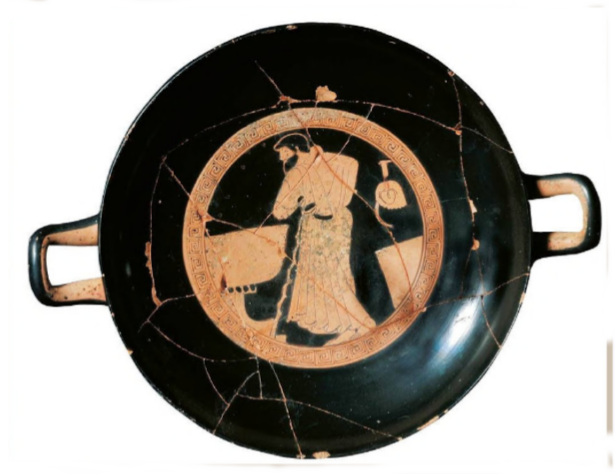
Kilyx, red-figure pottery 480 BC tomb 39, Poggio Sommavilla necropolis, archivio SBALazio Etruria Meridionale.

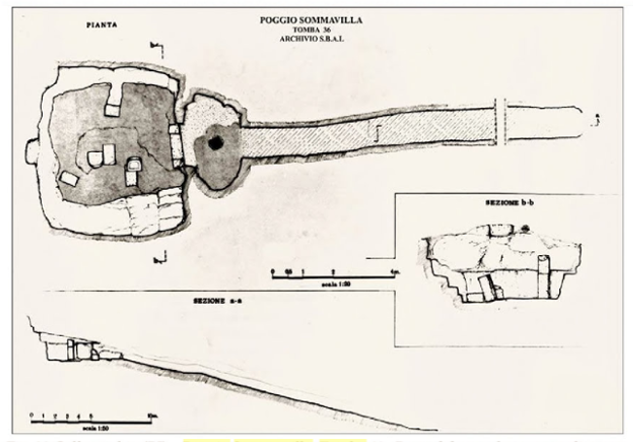
Planimetry of tomb 36, Poggio Sommavilla necropolis, archivio SBALazio Etruria Meridionale.

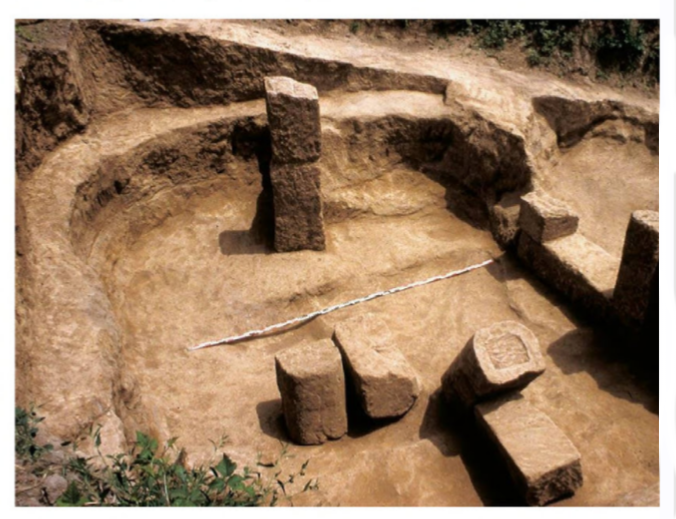
Tomb 36, Poggio Sommavilla necropolis, archivio SBALazio Etruria Meridionale.

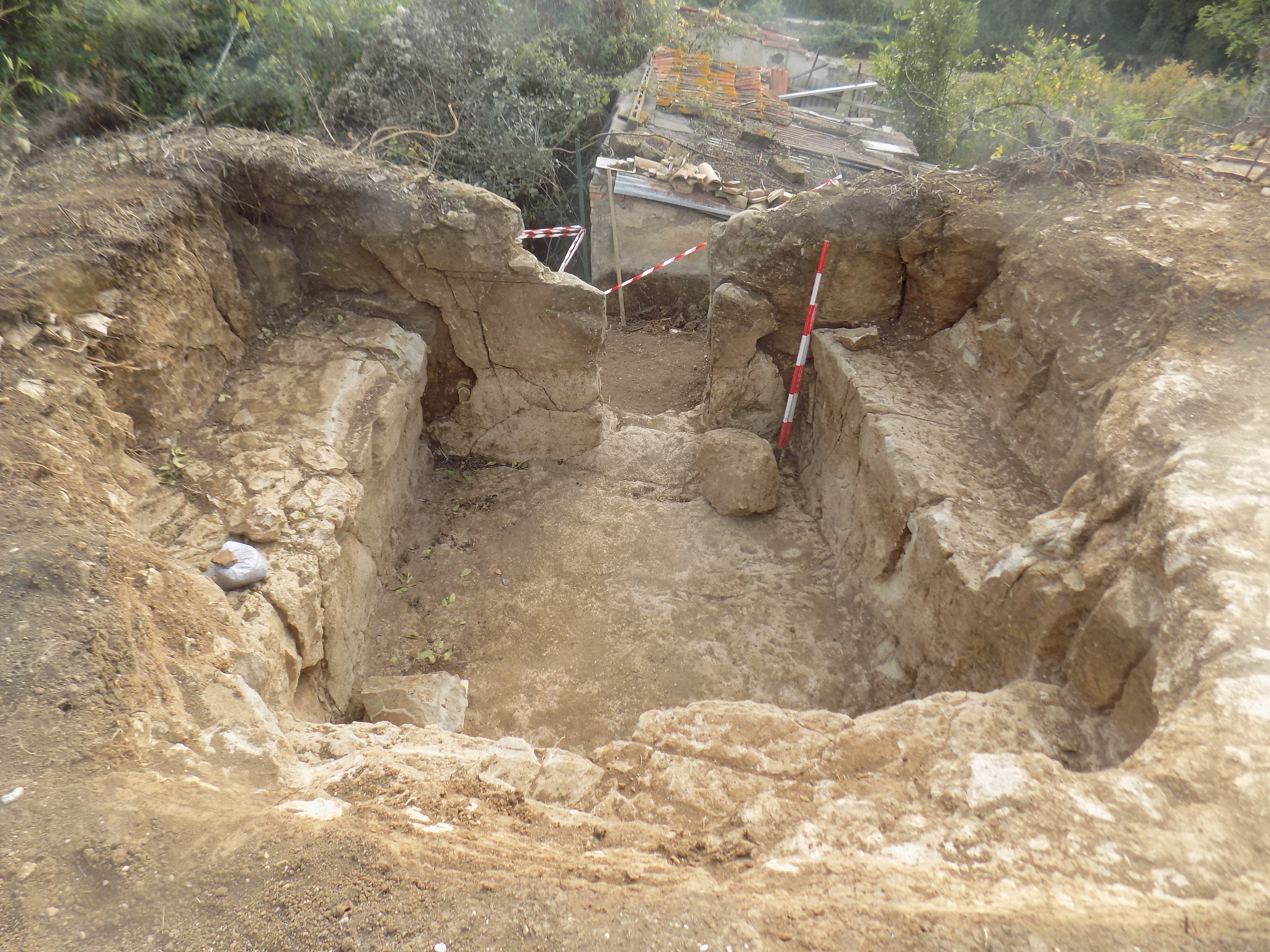
Tomb of the ara dei Gelsi, Poggio Sommavilla necropolis, SBALazio Etruria meridionale

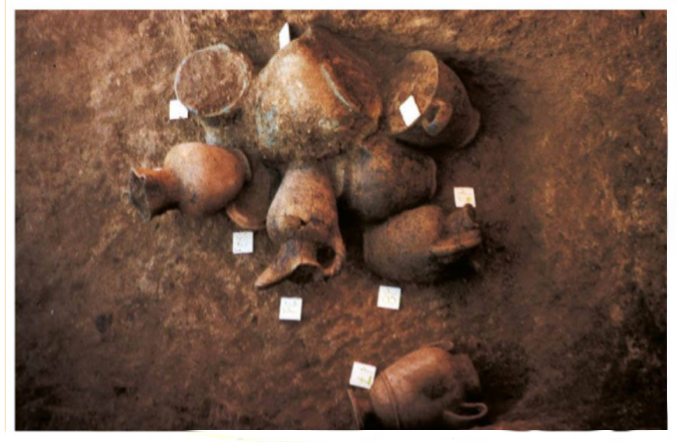
Excavations of grave 48, Poggio Sommavilla necropolis, archivio SBALazio Etruria Meridionale.

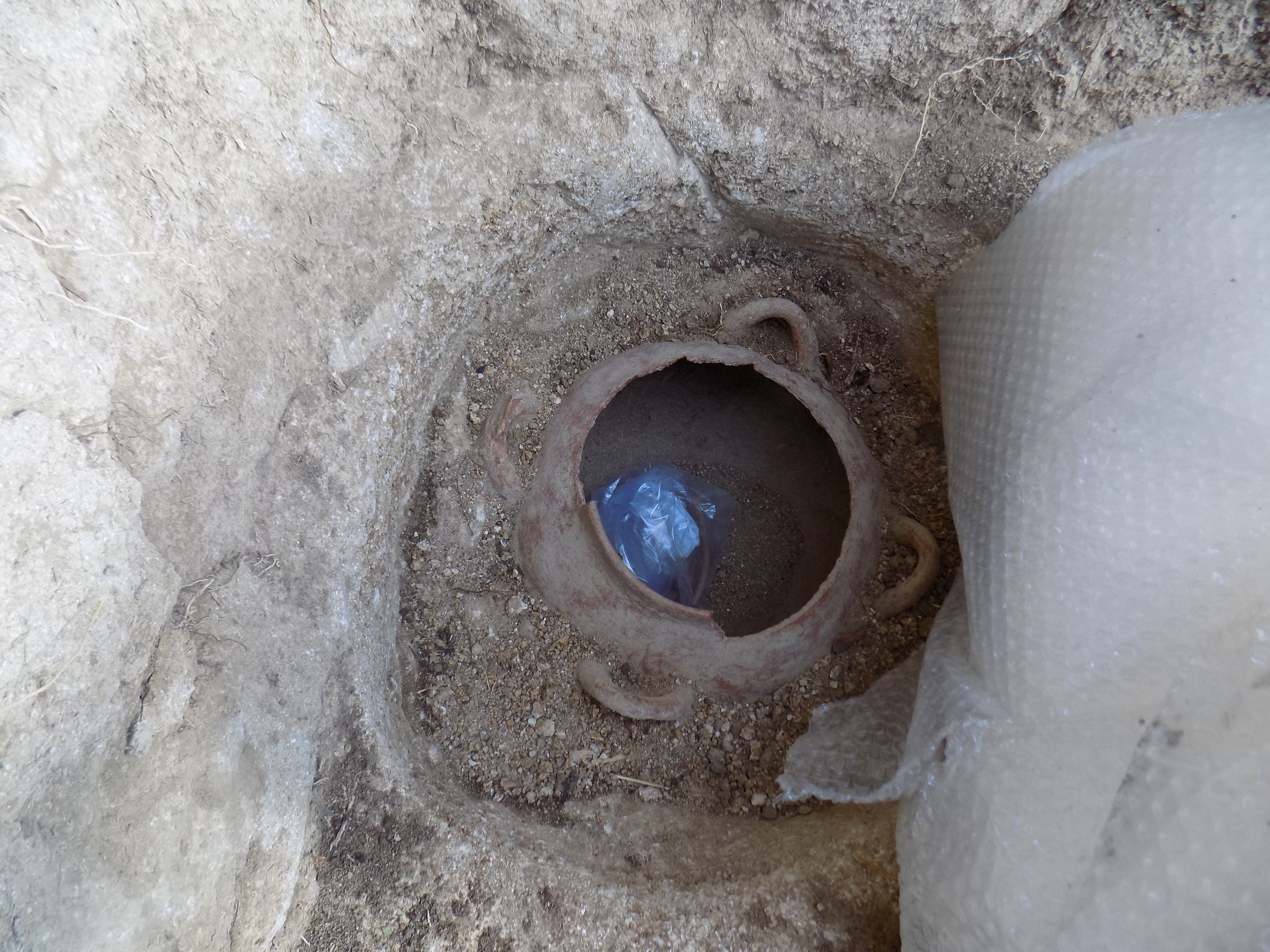
Lebes Greek ceramic, tomb of the ara dei Gelsi, Poggio Sommavilla necropolis SBALazio etruria meridionale.

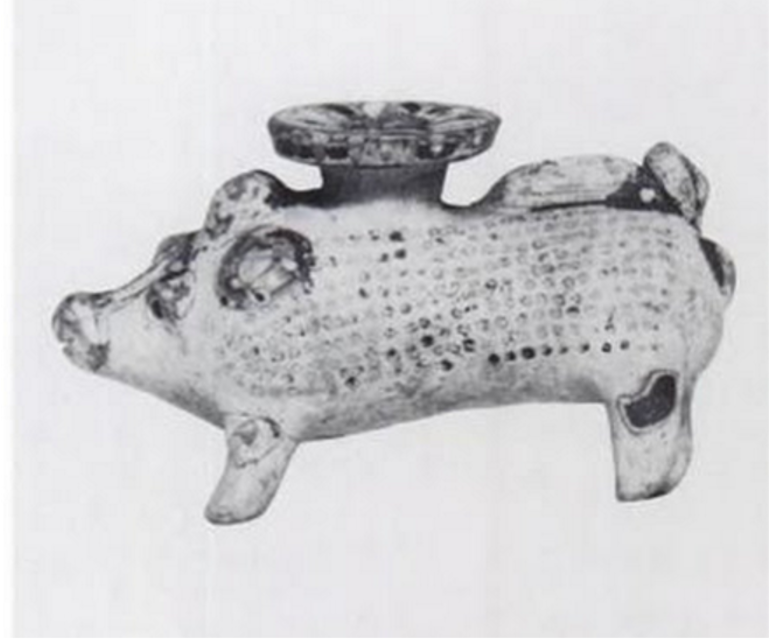
Boar-shaped balsam jar, tomb II necropolis of Poggio Sommavilla Archaeological Museum Florence.

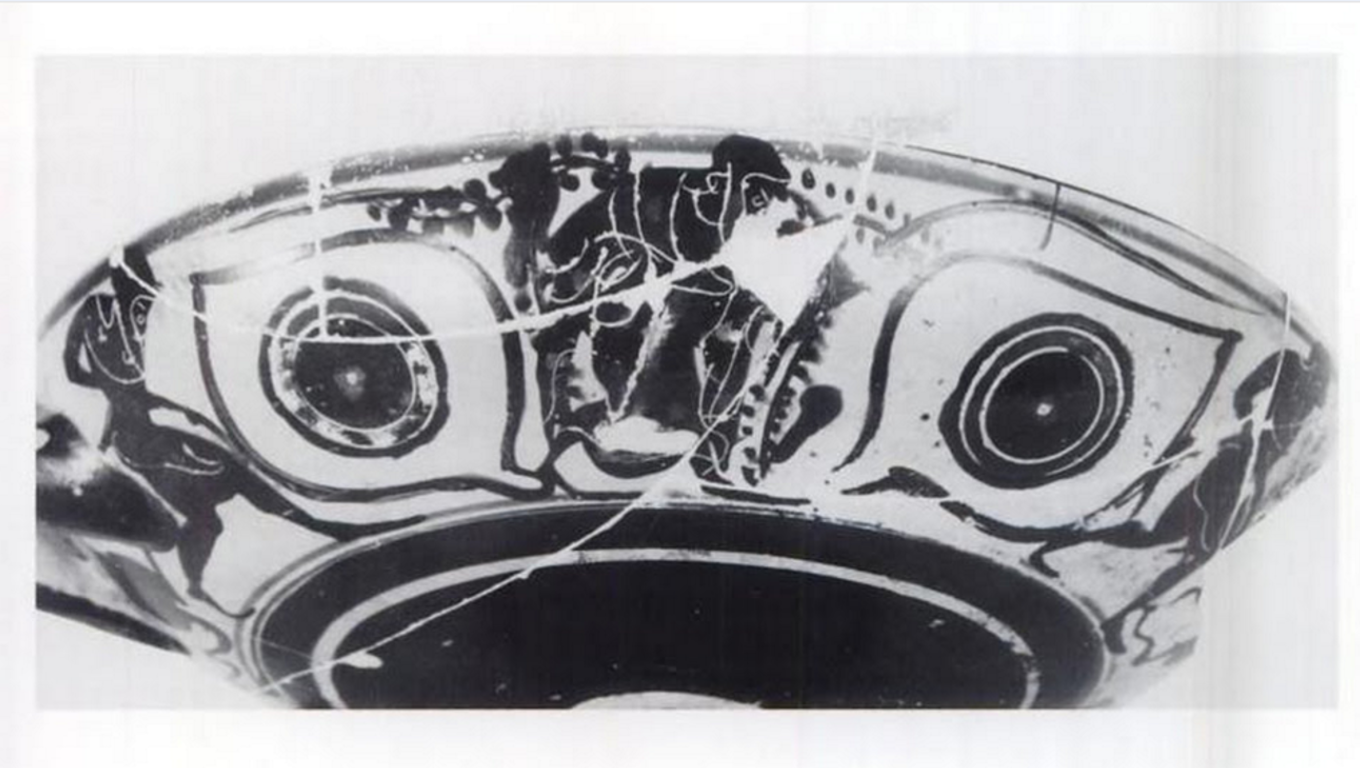
Kylix, red-figure ceramic, tomb 2 Poggio Sommavilla necropolis, Florence Archaeological Museum.

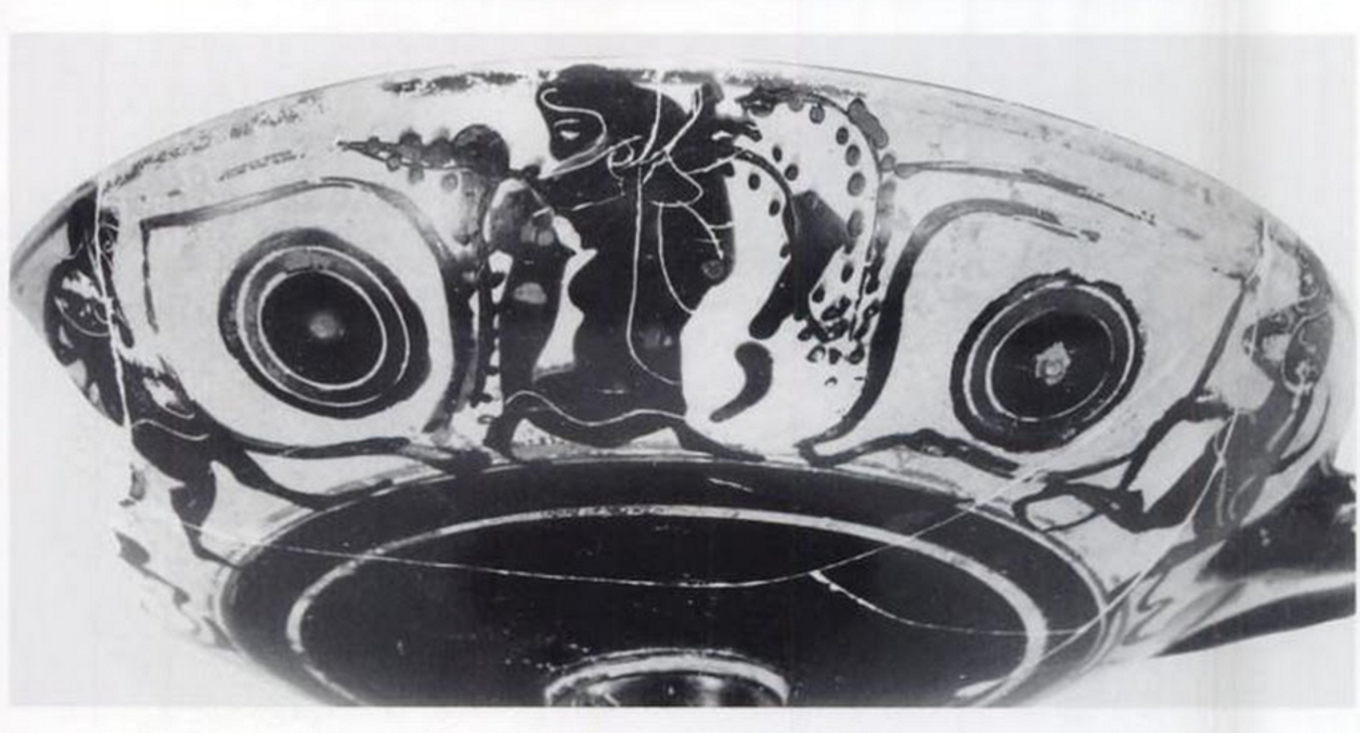
Kylix, red-figure ceramic, tomb II necropolis of Poggio Sommavilla, Archaeological Museum of Florence.

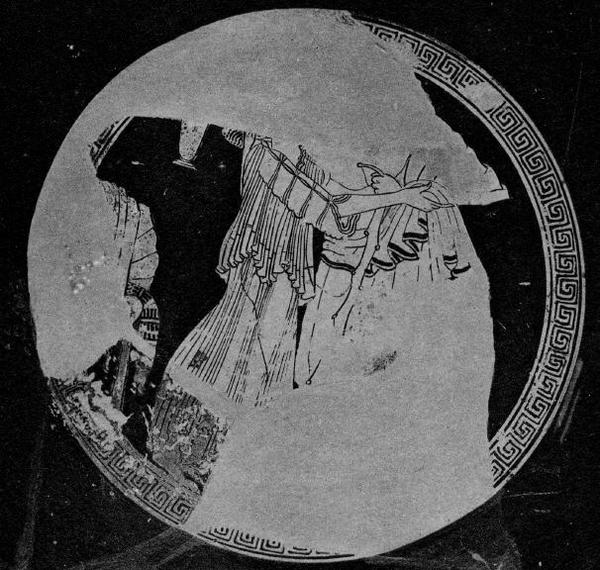
Kilyx erotica, medallion, red-figure pottery, 500-450 BC Necropolis of Poggio Sommavilla, Oxford Museum

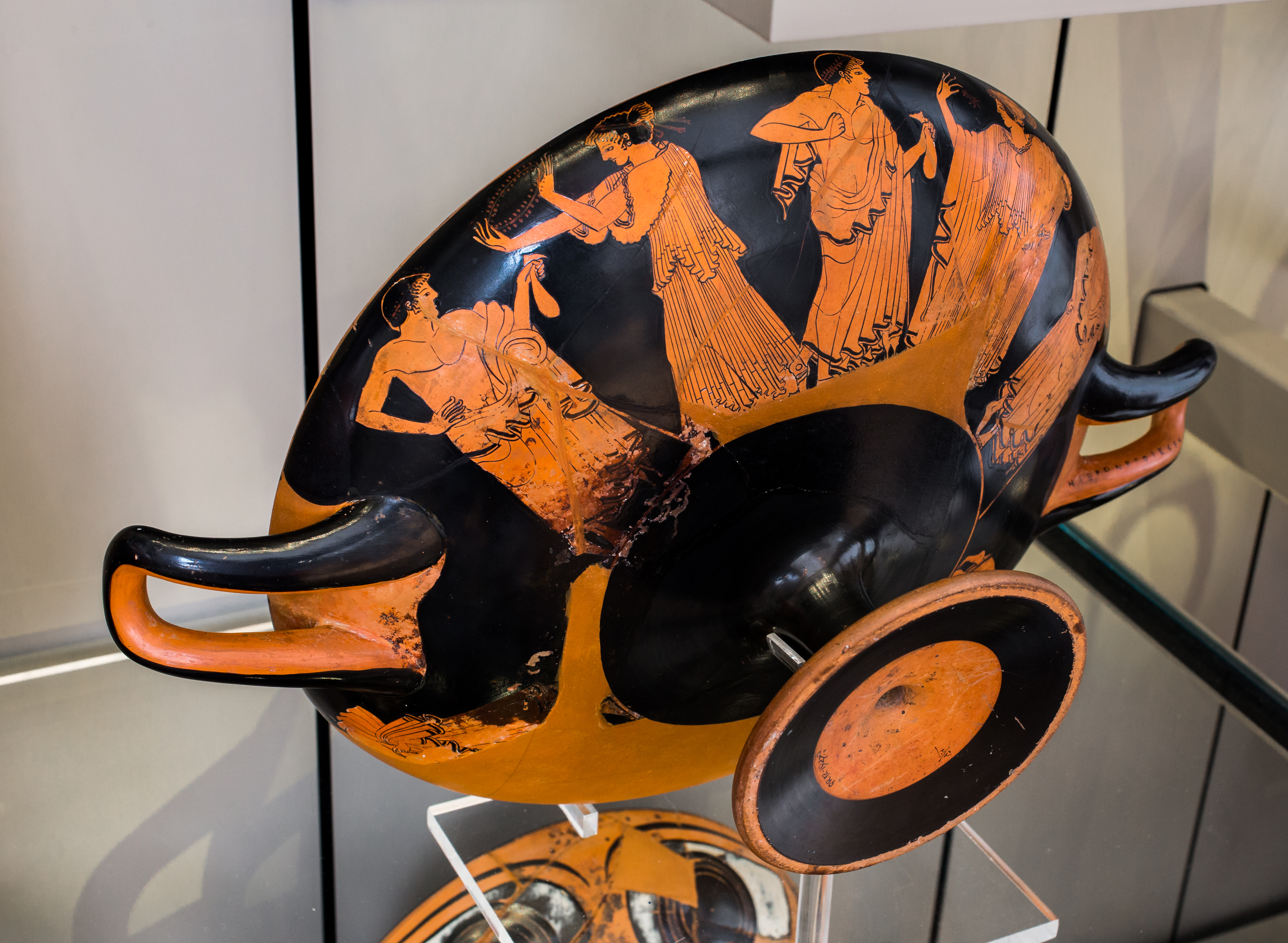
Attic red-figure kilyx, women with garland and sprig and young people with bags - 490-480 BC. necropolis of Poggio Sommavilla, production: Athens - potter: HIERON EPOIESEN - painter: Makron, Cambridge Museum Oxford

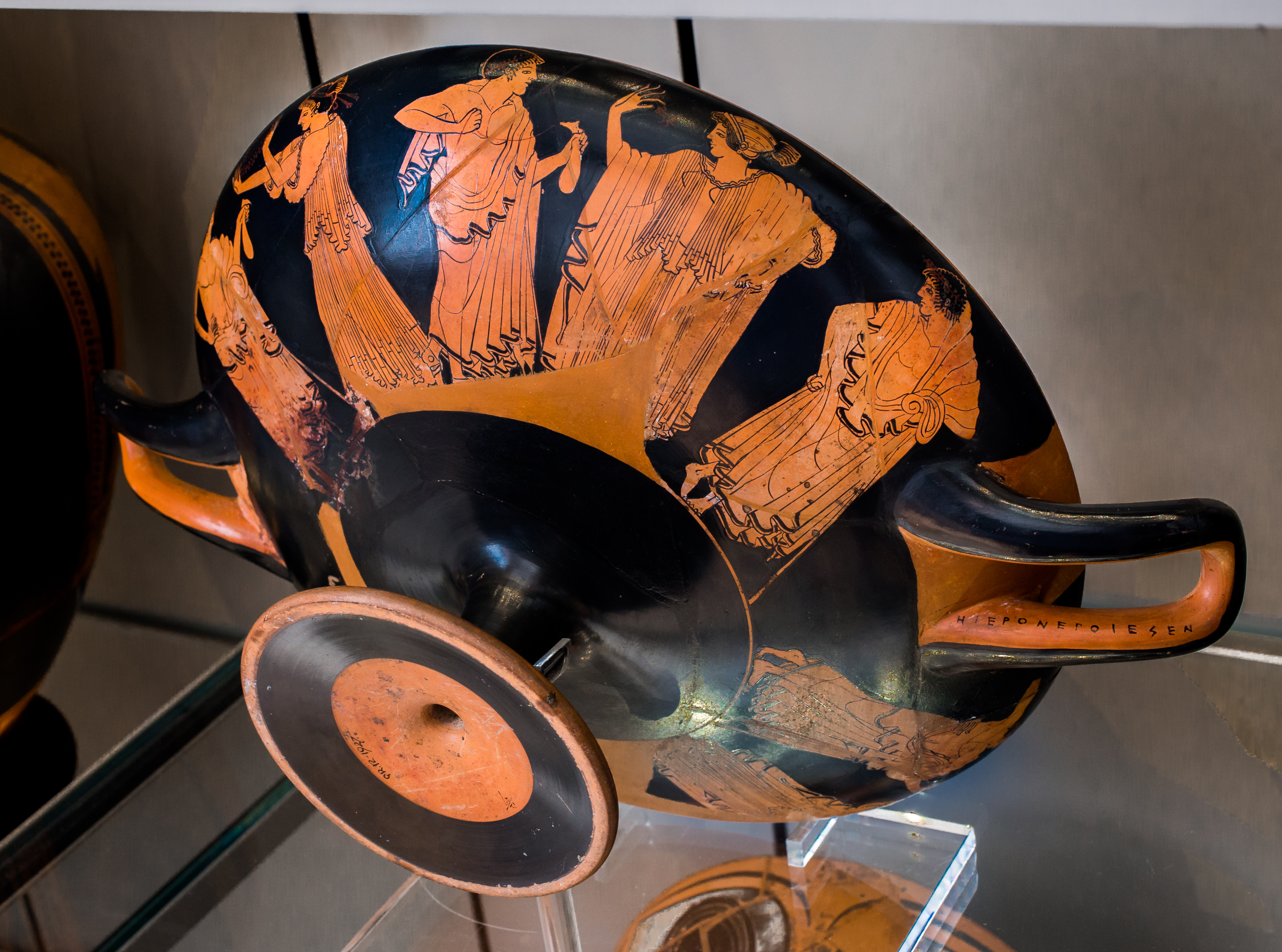
Attic red-figure kilyx, women with garland and sprig and young people with bags - 490-480 BC. necropolis of Poggio Sommavilla, production: Athens - potter: HIERON EPOIESEN - painter: Makron, Cambridge Museum Oxford

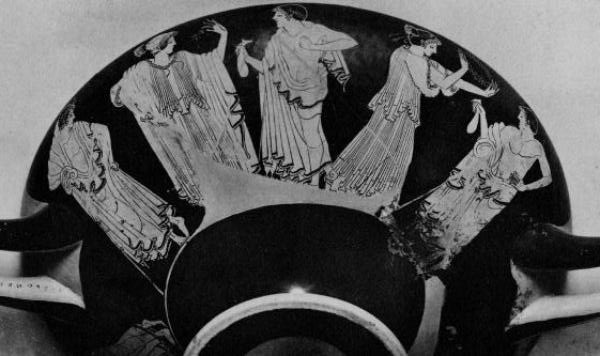
Erotic red-figure ceramic kylix, with inscription on the left handle ιερον εποιεσεν, 500-450 BC. Necropolis of Poggio Sommavilla, Oxford Museum

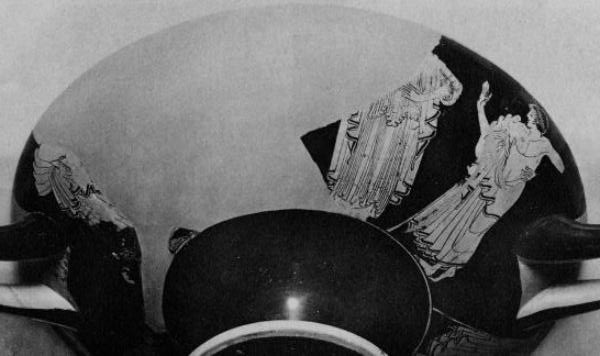
Red-figure ceramic erotic kylix, 500-450 BC Necropolis of Poggio Sommavilla, Oxford Museum

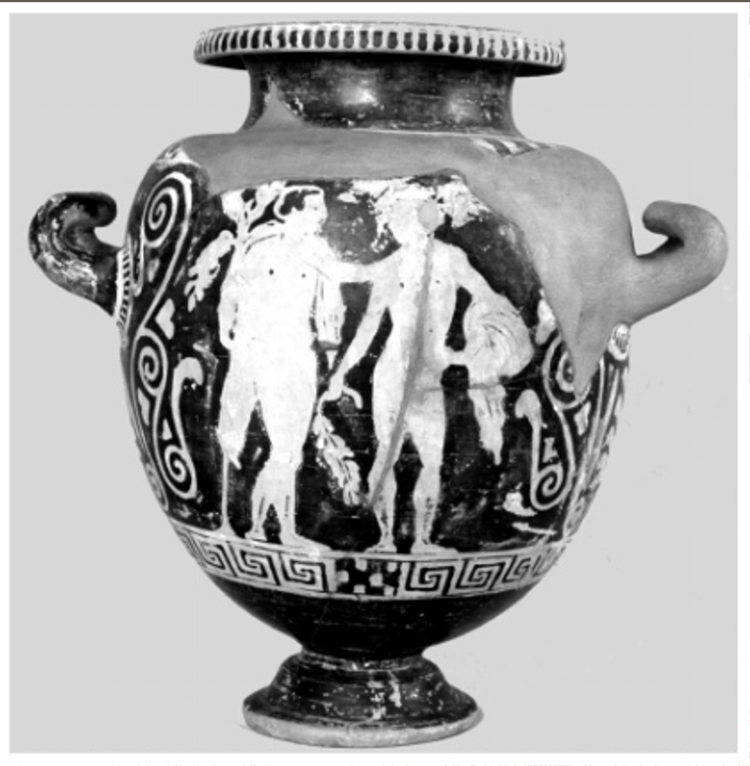
Stamnos by the Sommavilla Painter, red-figure ceramic, naked boys, 5th BC Necropolis of Genoa, Civic Archaeological Museum Genoa Pegli.

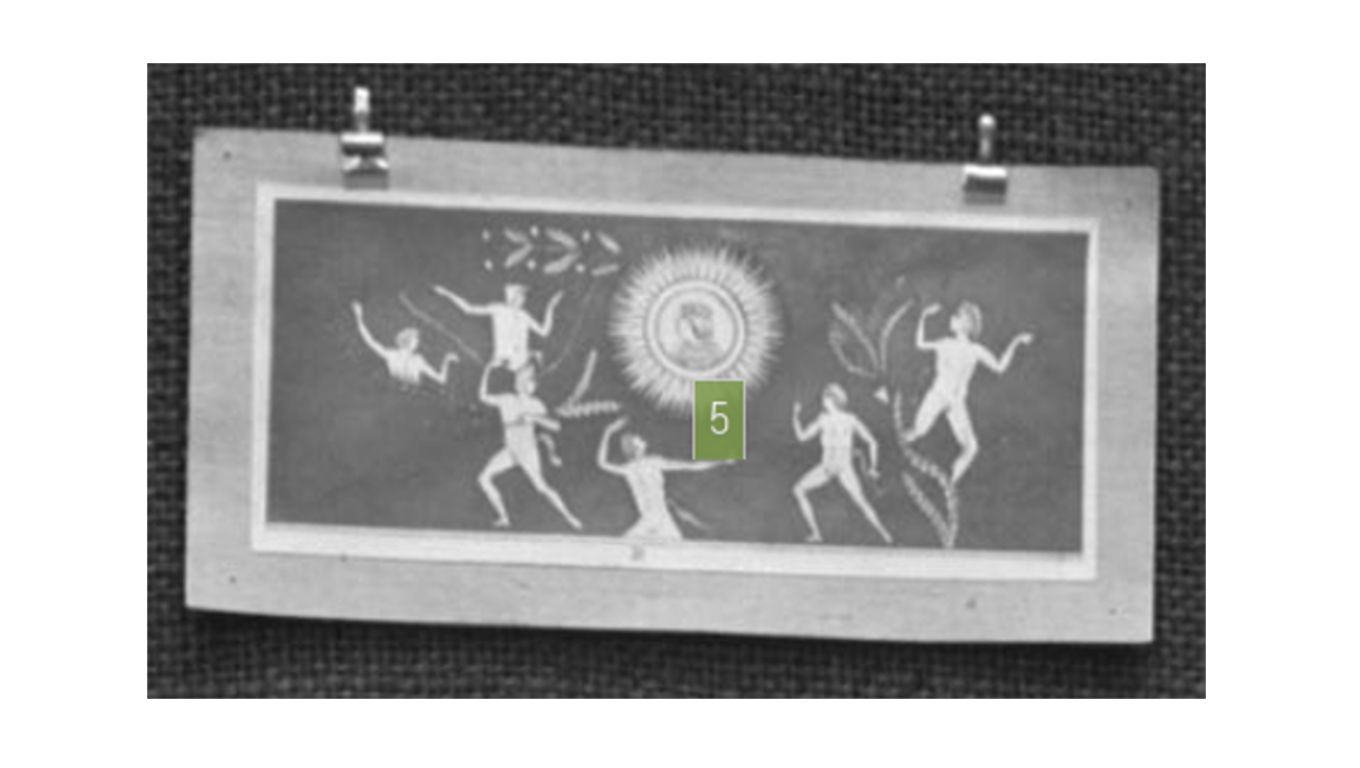
Sun rises between six satyrs, drawing of the decoration of a red-figure ceramic krater 380-360 BC. Necropolis of Poggio Sommavilla, Archaeological Museum of Parma.

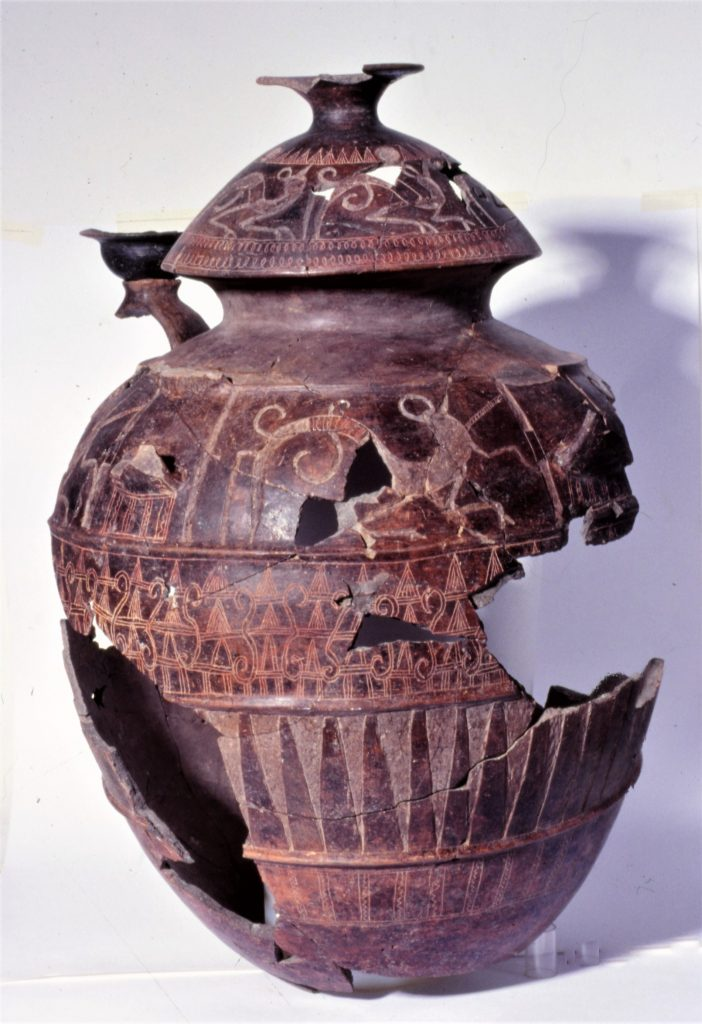
Olla from the fantastic bestiary, excision of fantastic animals, tomb II VI BC necropolis of Poggio Sommavilla, archivio SBALazio Museo Civico Rieti.

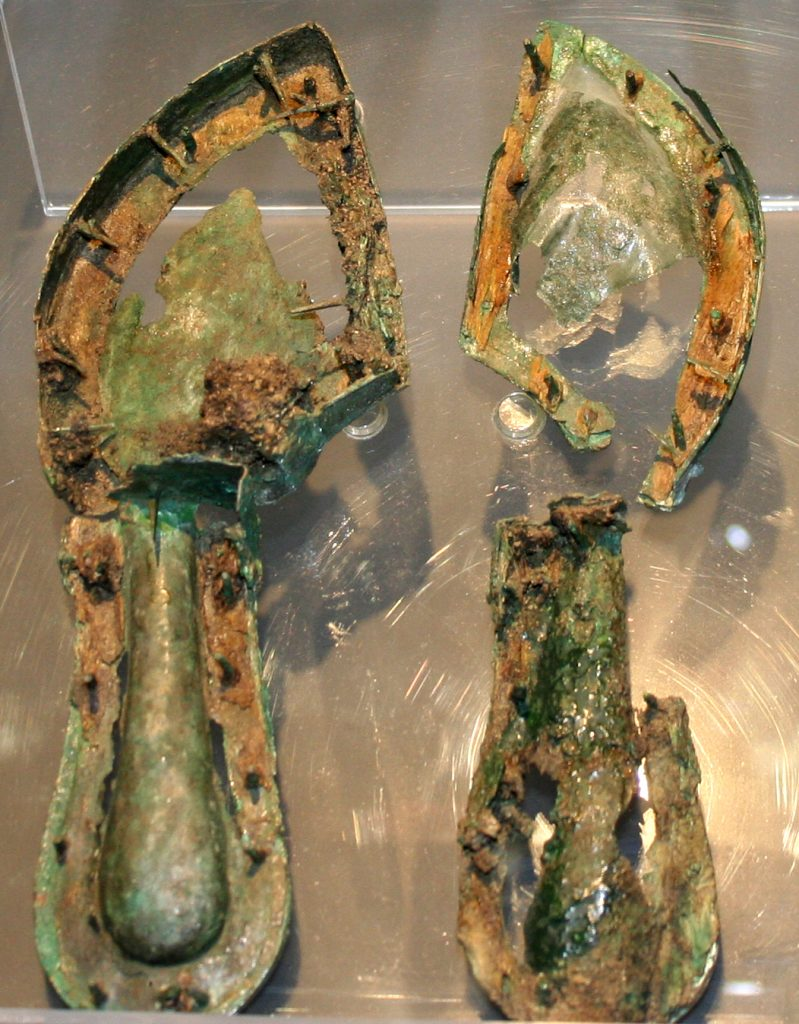
Bronze elements, Poggio Sommavilla necropolis archivio SBALazio etruria meridionale.

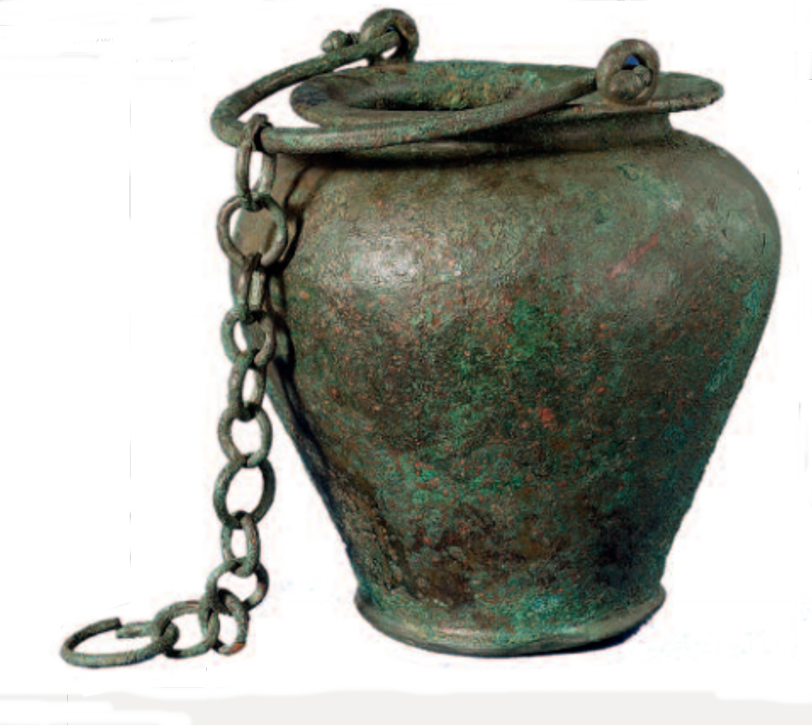
Bronze situla VI V BC tomb 32, Poggio Sommavilla necropolis archivio SBLazio etruria meridionale

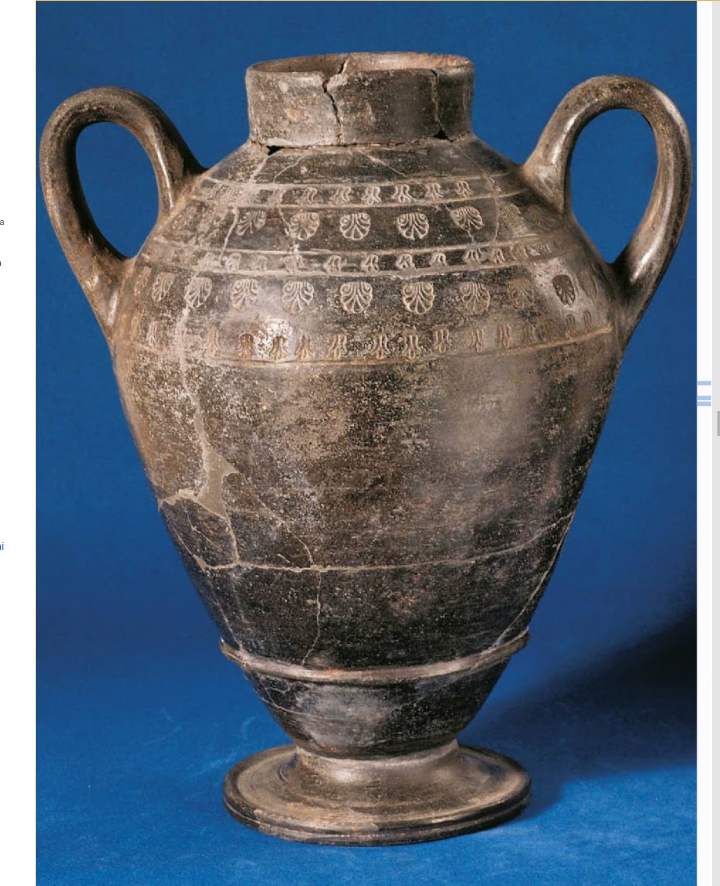
Amphora with decoration impressed on small cylinders, locally produced, tomb in the Poggio Sommavilla necropolis Archivio Soprintendenza Archeologia del Lazio e dell'Etruria Meridionale

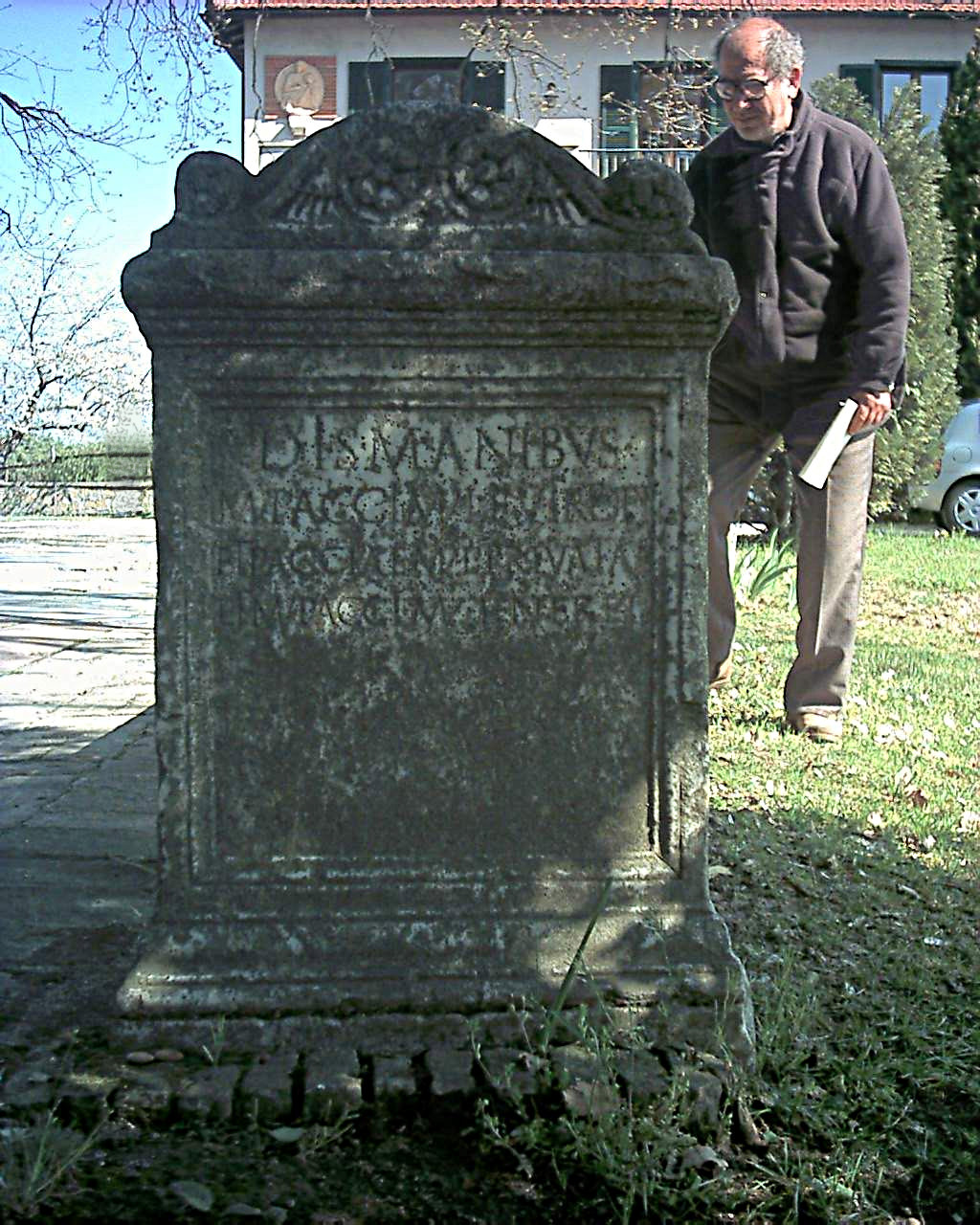
Memorial stone of African freedom, of the Pacci, courtyard of the Cicignano crossroads building and the local historian avv. Umberto Mattei

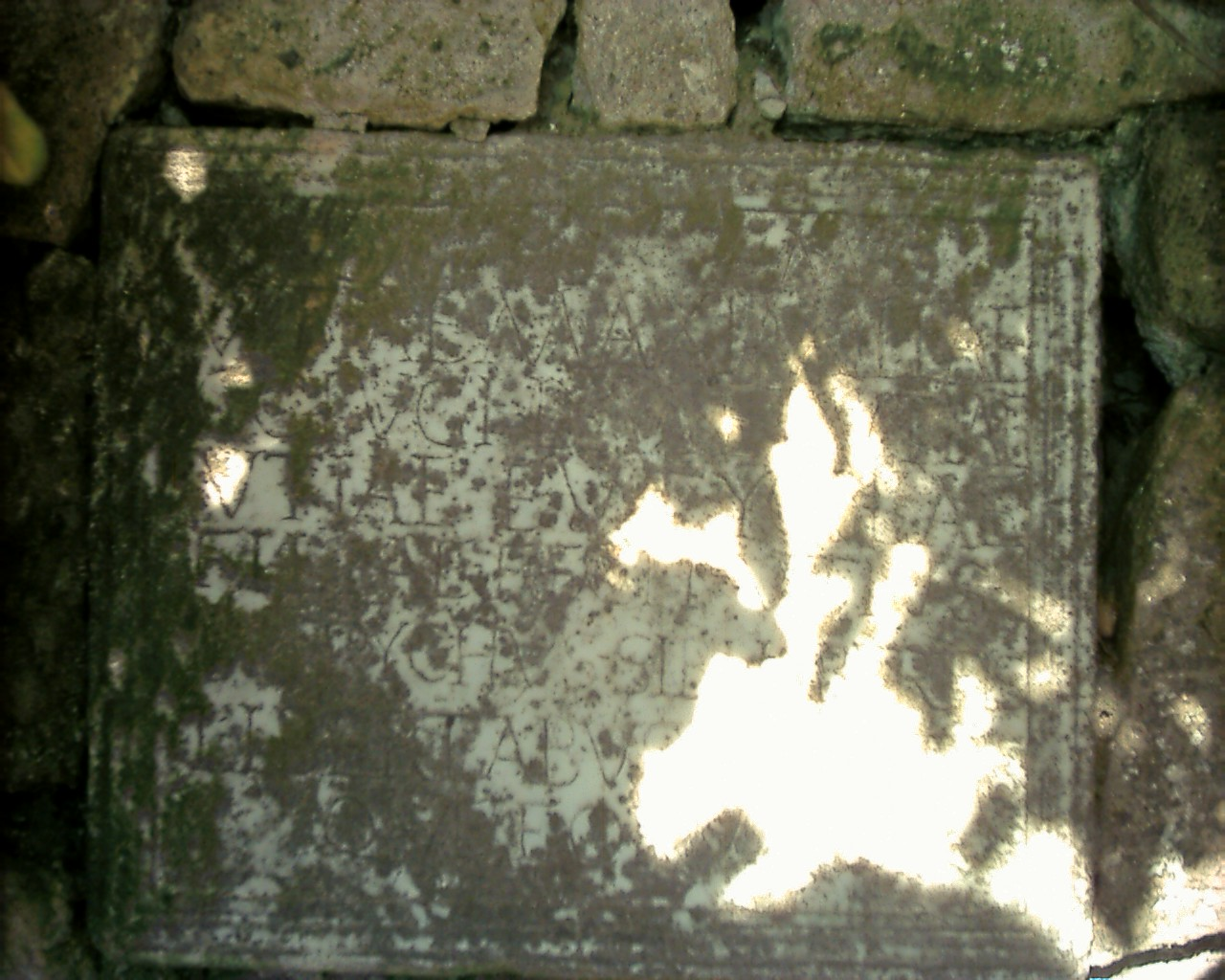
Roman inscription in the courtyard of the Cicignano crossroads block

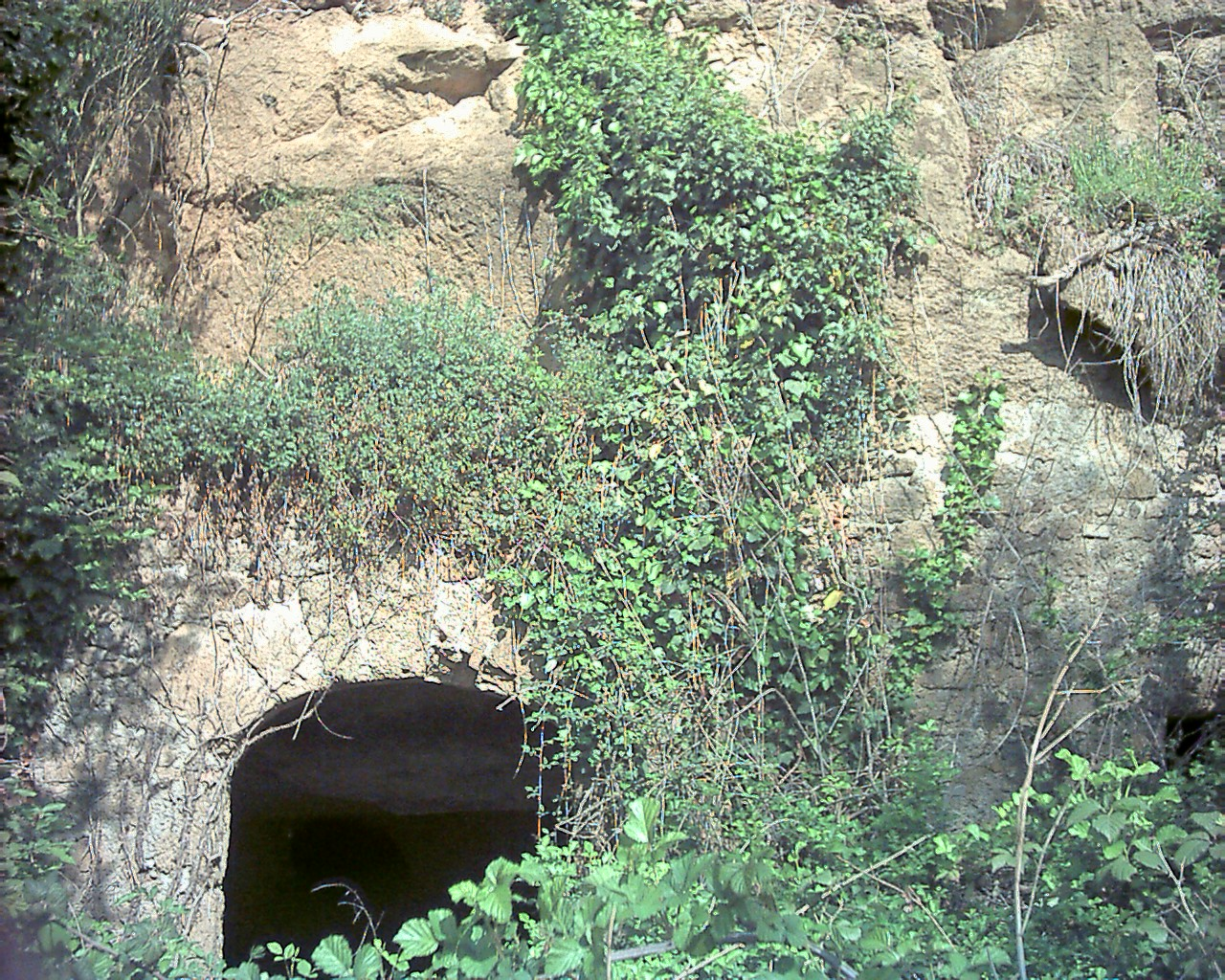
Toccia ruins, arched door on the tuff spur, area of the archaic Votive Well, Ponte del Peccato, valley of the Aia stream, Grappignano Poggio Sommavilla.

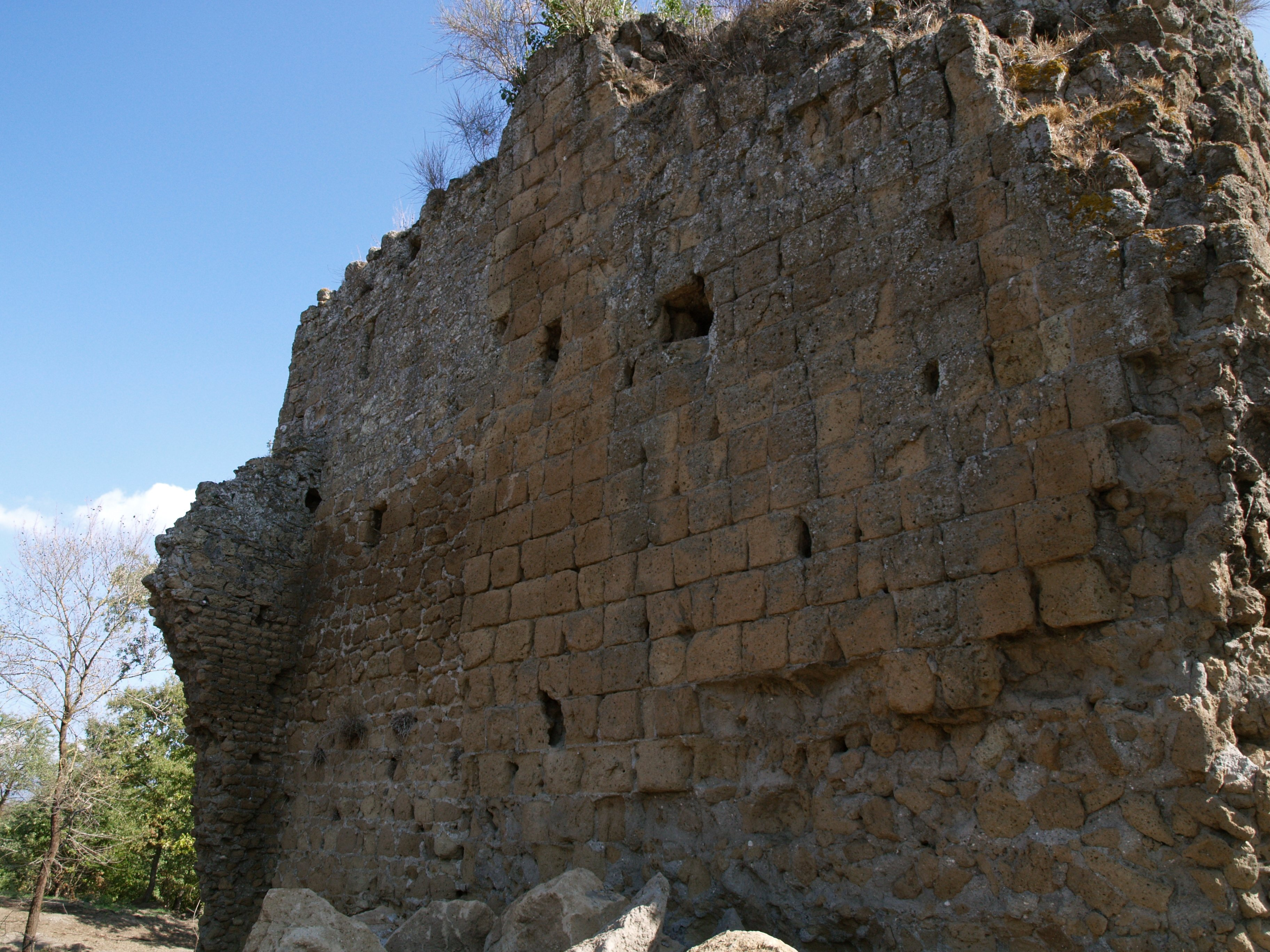
Grappignano, archaeological area

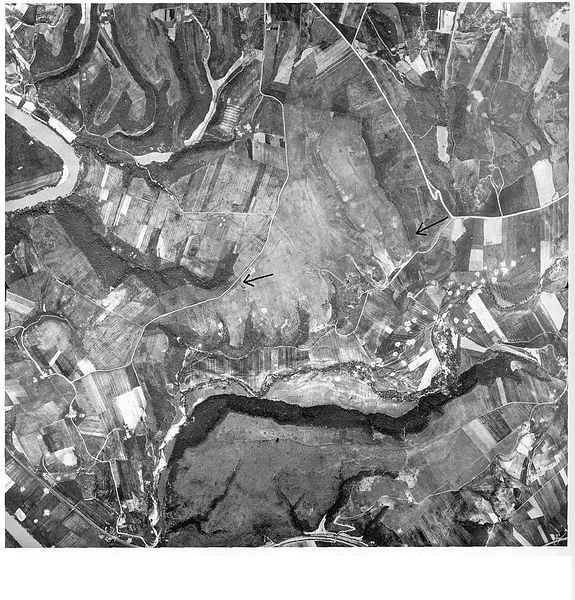
Ancient roads, aerial bombing of RAF Grappignano

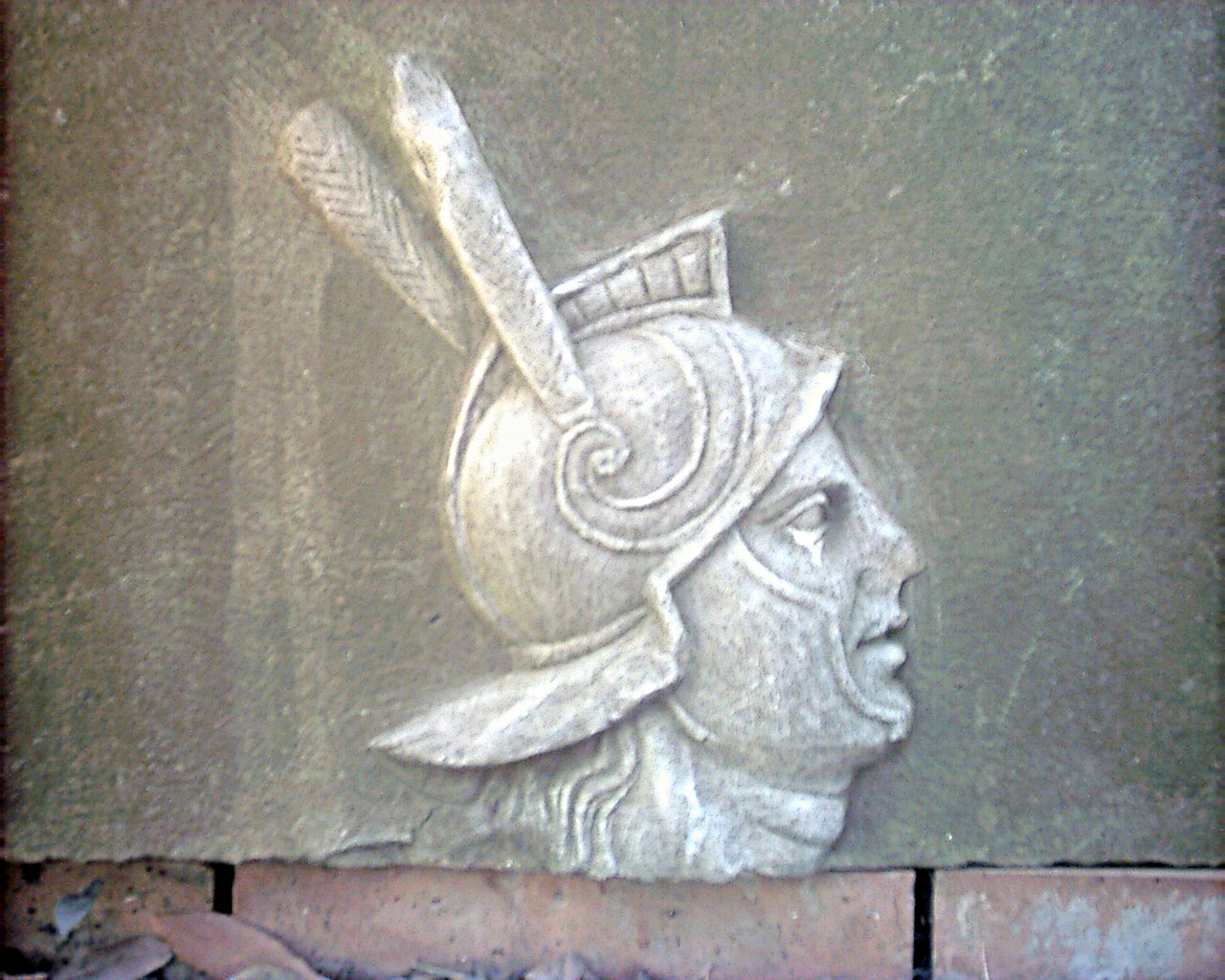
Marble bas-relief of a plumed helmet, Casone Collevecchio, provenance of the Colli monument

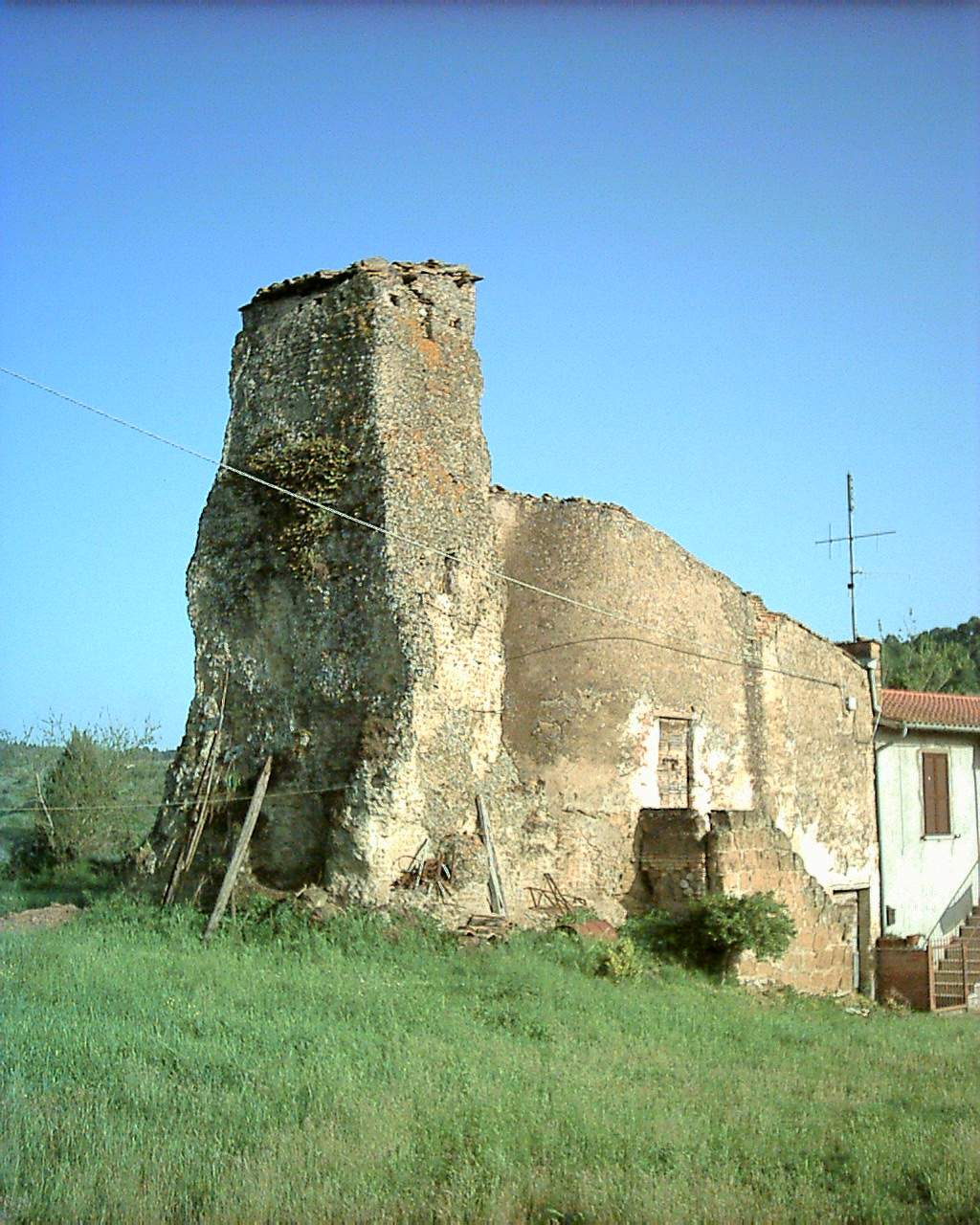
Torre Romana with construction of a severed boundary, Colli road Fosso del Barcone, Madonna del Piano fountain, valley of the Aia stream, Collevecchio-Poggio Sommavilla

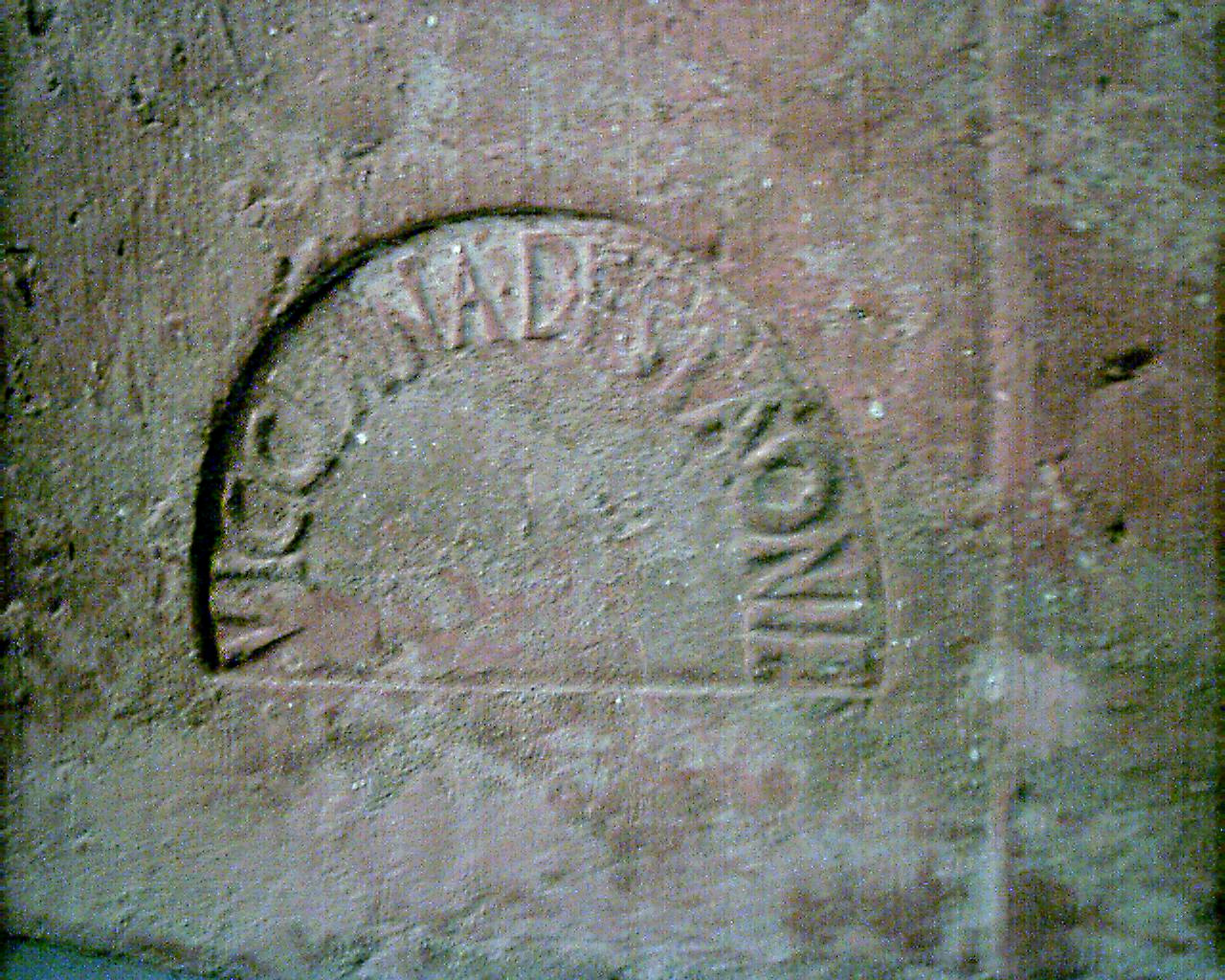
VICCIANA tile stamp. DF. STATONIE. common Roman burial ground of the freedman Satrino, station road. of Poggio Sommavilla, preserved in the Municipality of Collevecchio

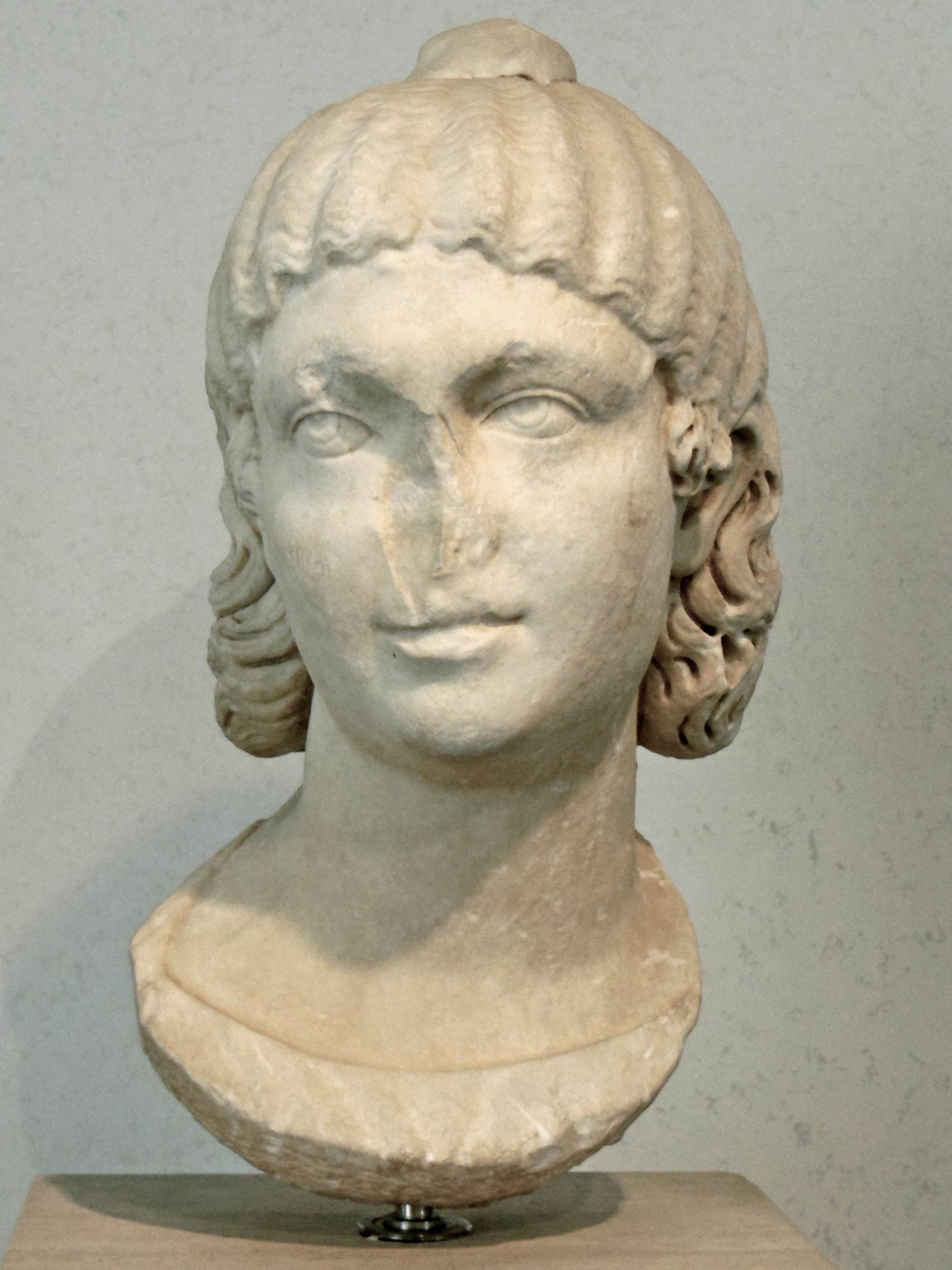
Statue of Tranquillina, tfound by a farmer near the locality known as the dei Frati north of the current historic center of Poggio Sommavilla

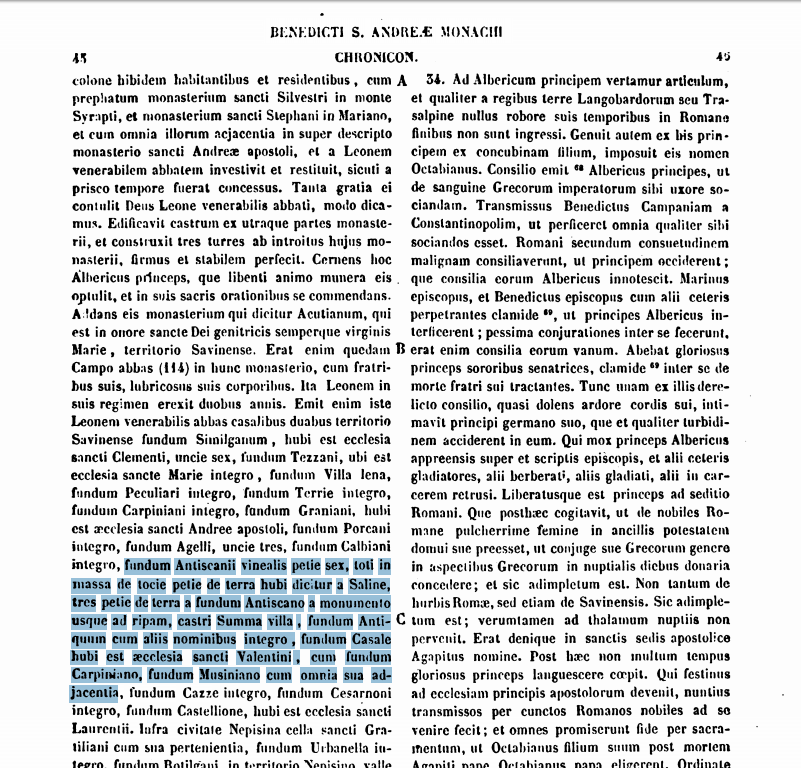
Castri Summa Villa Chronicon 33 di Benedetto del Soratte p. 46

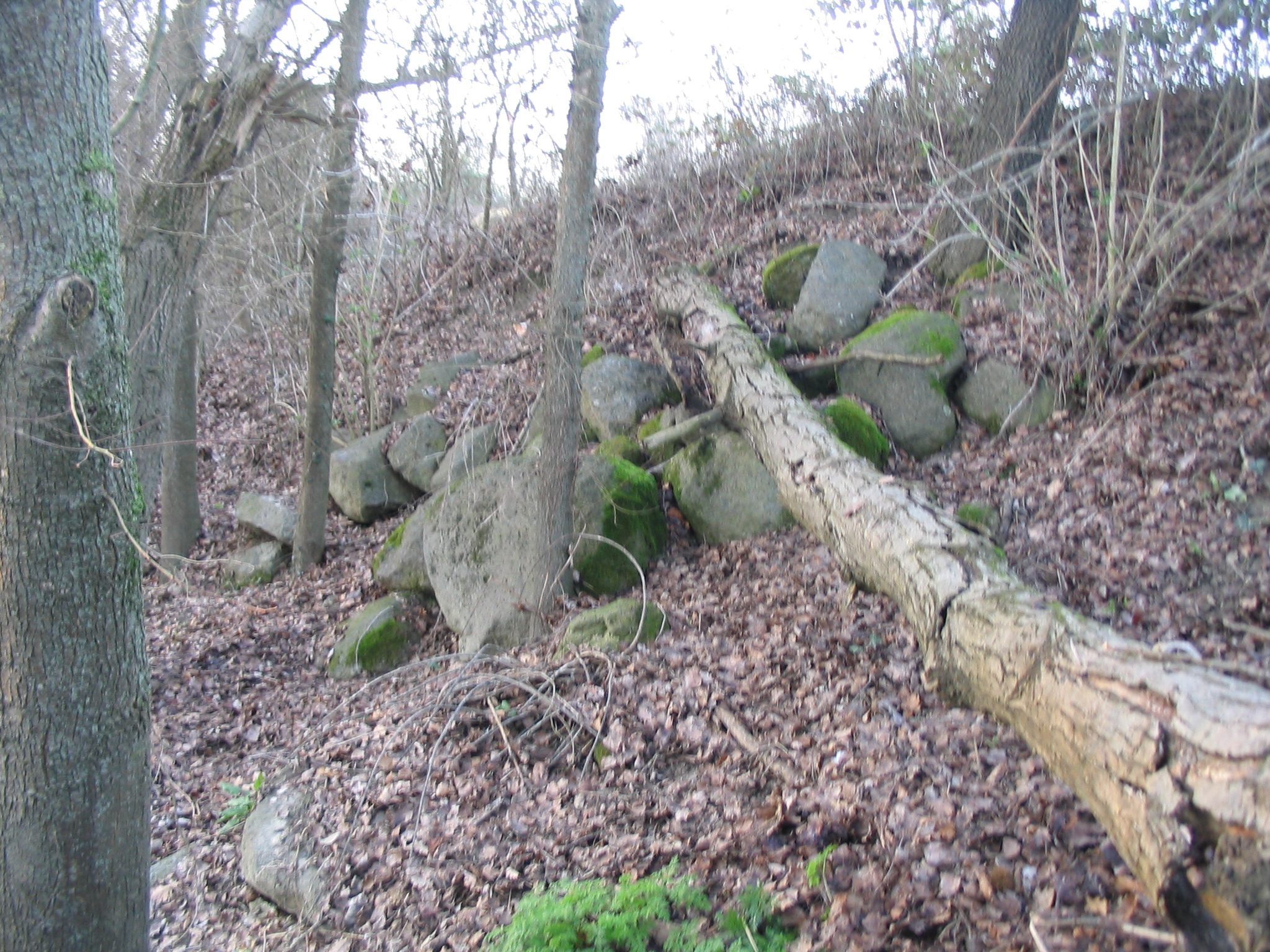
Basements (Basolati) on a floodplain embankment of the Tiber, Campo Rampone, Poggio Sommavilla archaeological area, Tiber Valley

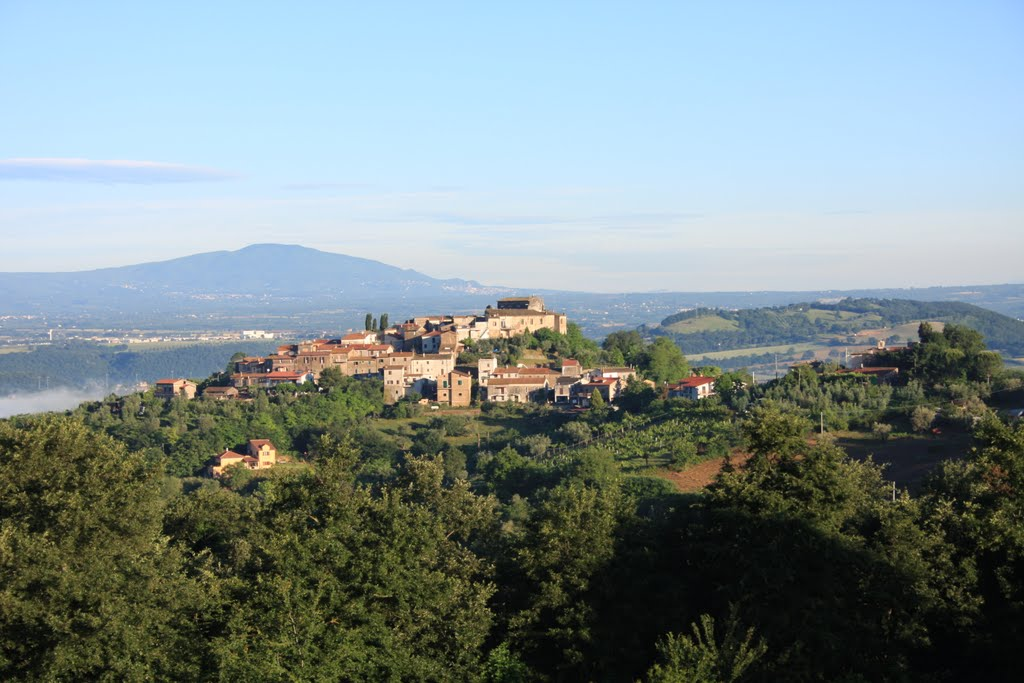
Poggio Sommavilla Poggetto, current historical center, archaeological area

== See also ==
- Tiber Valley
- Foglia
- Falerii Veteres
- Via Tiberina
- Via Flaminia
- Archaeological Museum of Magliano Sabina

== Bibliography ==
- Stefania Quilici Gigli, Il Tevere e le altre vie d'acqua del Lazio antico (Quaderni di archeologia etrusco italica), Roma, CNR, 1986
- Flaminia Verga, Ager Foronovanus I (Forma Italiae, 44), Firenze 2006
- Paola Santoro (a cura di), Rilettura critica della necropoli di Poggio Sommavilla, Pisa-Roma 1977
- Paola Santoro, Poggio Sommavilla: note sull'insediamento arcaico, Vol. 43, Tomo Primo, Miscellanea etrusca e italica in onore di Massimo Pallottino (1991)
- Filippo Materazzi, Rilettura del centro sabino di Poggio Sommavilla. La storia, la topografia, la famiglia Piacentini, Archeologia Classica LXXIII, 2022.
- A. Pasqui - A. Cozza - F. Bernabei - G.F. Gammurrini, Antichità del Territorio Falisco esposte al Museo Nazionale Etrusco di Villa Giulia (Monumenti Antichi)
- M. Pallottino, Stirpi e Lingue nel Lazio e intorno al Lazio in eta' arcaica (Etruria e Lazio arcaico)
- Umberto Mattei, La Sabina tiberina dalla preistoria alla fine dell'impero romano, 2004
- Helle Salskov Robers, «Five tomb Groups in the Danish National Museum from Narce, Capena and Poggio Sommavilla»
- Carbonara A., Messineo G., Via Tiberina («Antiche strade» Lazio), Roma 1994
- EaD, Il pittore di Sommavilla e il problema della nascita delle figure rosse in Etruria, 1982
- M. Cristina Biella, Lucio G. Perego, Enrico Giovanelli, Il bestiario fantastico di età orientalizzante nella penisola italiana, 2012.
