= Praecilia gens =

The gens Praecilia or Precilia, also written as Praecillia or Precillia, was an obscure plebeian family at ancient Rome. Few members of this gens are mentioned in history, but a number are known from inscriptions.

== Origin ==
The nomen Praecilius belongs to a class of gentilicia typically derived from cognomina ending in the diminutive suffix -ulus. The root might be praeco, a crier or herald, belonging to a common type of surname derived from offices and occupations.

== Praenomina ==
By far the most abundant praenomen among the Praecilii was Lucius, accounting for more than half of all the individuals known from inscriptions. They also made regular use of Titus, Gaius, Publius, Quintus, and Marcus, all of which were very common throughout Roman history. The only other praenomen found among the Praecilii is Sextus, found in a filiation.

== Members ==
This list includes abbreviated praenomina. For an explanation of this practice, see filiation.

- Praecilia, buried at Rome, was the wife of Publius Luscius Asc[...].
- Precilia, named in an inscription from Carthage in Africa Proconsularis.
- Praecilia L. f., buried at Anagnia in Latium, aged forty-three.
- Praecilius, recommended to Caesar by Cicero, in 45 BC.
- Precilius T. f., named in an inscription from Rome.
- Gaius Praecilius, buried at Portus in Latium.
- Lucius Precilius, tribune of the plebs at an uncertain date.
- Titus Precilius T. f., of Lugdunum in Gallia Lugdunensis, was a cornicen, or horn player, who served in the third legion. He was buried at Ammaedara in Africa Proconsularis, aged thirty-five, having served nineteen years.
- Titus Precilius T. l., a freedman, buried at Nomentum in Latium.
- Precilia Anthusa, a house-slave, built a tomb at Rome for her master, a boy named Lucius Precilius Onesimus.
- Precilia Aphrodite, buried at Rome, aged twenty years, eleven months, with a tomb built by her husband, Lucius Titius Phocas.
- Gaius Precilius Apollonides, client of Sextus Sentius Proculus, proquaestor of Asia, mentioned in an inscription from Ephesus in Asia Minor, dating from the mid-second to early third century AD.
- Lucius Precilius Apollonius, husband of Fabia Tichine. They built a tomb at Rome for their son, Lucius Precilius Romanus.
- Praecilius Buturus, husband of Caecilia Libosa, and father of Quintus Praecilius Genialis.
- Lucius Precilius L. f. Charitas, named in an inscription from Rome, dating to AD 136.
- Lucius Praecilius L. f. Clemens Julianus, a veteran soldier, primus pilus in the fifth legion, according to an inscription from Salona in Dalmatia, dating to AD 41.
- Lucius Precilius Crescens, buried a son at Rome.
- Titus Precilius T. Ɔ. l. Davus, a freedman named in an inscription from Rome.
- Gaius Precilius Epaphra, a soldier stationed at Rome in AD 70, serving in the century of Tiberius Julius Primigenius.
- Lucius Precilius Epitynchanus, buried at Rome.
- Praecilia Euthychia, wife of Expentanius Aquila, buried at Arelate in Gallia Narbonensis.
- Precilia L. l. Fausta, a freedwoman of Lucius Precilius Optatus, named in an inscription from Ostia in Latium.
- Lucius Precilius Felix, buried at Vicus Antoniae Saturninae in Numidia.
- Precilius Festus, one of the masters of the collegium fabrum, or artisans' guild, at Rome, named in an inscription dating to AD 154.
- Praecilius Fidus, brother of Publius Praecilius Pollio and Praecilius Vitalis.
- Precilia Fortunata, together with her husband, Aulus Herennuleius Candidus, built a tomb at Rome for their children, Aulus Herennuleius Candidianus, age five, and Herennuleia Candida, age eight.
- Lucius Precilius Fortunatus, son of Precilia Nice, buried at Rome, with a monument from his client, Lucius Precilius Trophimus.
- Lucius Praecilius Fortunatus, named in an inscription from Cirta in Numidia.
- Publius Precilius Fortunatus, named in an inscription from Rome.
- Quintus Praecilius Genialis, son of Praecilius Buturus and Caecilia Libosa, buried at Thagaste in Africa Proconsularis, aged eighty-one.
- Lucius Precilius Ɔ. l. Hilarus, a freedman, probably formerly belonging to the wife of Lucius Precilius Optatus, named in an inscription from Ostia.
- Marcus Precilius M. f. Hispanus, named in an inscription from Rome.
- Praecilia Januaria, mother of Damalidus, named in a funerary inscription from Tarraco in Hispania Citerior.
- Lucius Precilius L. f. Juvenalis, donated to a temple at Rome, together with Pylades, a slave in the service of Trajan.
- Praecilius Marinus, buried at Rome on the sixth day before the Kalends of October, aged forty-three years, one month, and twenty-six days.
- Quintus Precilius Nampamo, buried at Thugga in Africa Proconsularis, aged thirty.
- Precilia Ɔ. l. Nica, a freedwoman buried at Rome.
- Precilia Nice, mother of Lucius Precilius Fortunatus, whose client, Lucius Precilius Trophimus, built a tomb for them at Rome.
- Praecilius Nicostratus, built a tomb at Rome for his son, Plocamus, aged four years, eight months, and fifteen days.
- Lucius Precilius Onesimus, a boy who died aged nine years, seven months, was the master of Precilia Anthusa, a house-slave, who built a tomb for him at Rome.
- Lucius Precilius L. f. Optatus, named in an inscription from Ostia.
- Precilius Perseus, buried at Arelate, aged twenty, with a monument dedicated by his client, Precillia Themistiocla.
- Precilia Ɔ. l. Philematio, a freedwoman buried at Rome.
- Publius Praecilius M. f. Pollio, brother of Praecilius Fidus and Praecilius Vitalis, buried at Ammaedara in Africa Proconsularis.
- Precilius M. f. Pompeianus, a municipal official at Arelate.
- Lucius Precilius Pothinus, buried three of his children at Rome: a son aged three months, a daughter aged ten months, and a son Pothinus, aged seven years and ten months.
- Precilia Ɔ. l. Primigenia, a freedwoman buried at Atria in Venetia and Histria, with her sister, Firma, aged twenty.
- Precilia Primitiva, buried at Rome in a tomb built by her husband, Marcus Ulpius Asclepiades.
- Publius Precilius Publicianus, named in an inscription from Rome.
- Titus Praecilius T. l. Quintius, a freedman, and the husband of Latinia, named in an inscription from Rome.
- Marcus Praecilius M. f. Rogatianus, named in a dedicatory inscription from Tanaramusa in Mauretania Caesariensis.
- Praecilius M. f. C. n. Rogatus, son of Marcus Praecilius Secundus, and brother of Praecilius Saturninus.
- Lucius Precilius L. f. Romanus, son of Lucius Precilius Apollonius and Fabia Tichine, buried at Rome, aged nine years, eight months, and twelve days.
- Lucius Praecilius L. f. Sabinus, son of Lucius Praecilius Zosimus, buried at Rome, aged three years, five days.
- Precilius Salutaris, a centurion in the praetorian guard at Rome.
- Precilia Ɔ. l. Salvia, a freedwoman named in an inscription from Caere.
- Praecilius Saturninus, brother of Quintus Praecilius Victor.
- Praecilius M. f. C. n. Saturninus, son of Marcus Praecilius Secundus, and brother of Praecilius Rogatus.
- Marcus Praecilius C. f. Secundus, father of Praecilius Rogatus and Praecilius Saturninus, buried at the present site of Choud el-Batel, formerly part of Africa Proconsularis, aged seventy.
- Gaius Praecilius Serenus, named in an inscription from Rome dating to AD 200.
- Praecilia Sex. f. Setoriana, dedicated a sepulchre at Falerii Novi in Etruria for her daughter, Titia Praecilia, and her grandchildren, Titia Luria and Lucius Lurius Lurianus.
- Praecilia Severiana, wife of the senator Marcus Sempronius Proculus Faustinianus, and mother of Maconiana Severiana, buried at Rome.
- Precilia Severina, wife of Gaius Sinuleius Miccalus, to whom she was married for two years, eight months, and twenty-two days, buried at Parma in Etruria.
- Precilius Severus, buried at Rome in a tomb built by his children, Severus and Severina.
- Lucius Praecilius L. f. Severus, son of Mevania Praecilia, who dedicated a monument to him at Mevania in Umbria.
- Titus Precilius Silaugus, buried at Rome, aged fifteen.
- Titus Precilius T. l. Suavis, a freedman buried at Nomentum.
- Precilia Q. f. Tertia, buried at Albanum in Latium.
- Praecillia Thallusa, nurse of Aurelius Titianus, who was buried at Salona, aged about thirty-one years and two months. Praecilia and Aurelius Trophimus built a tomb for him.
- Precillia Themistiocla, client of Precilius Perseus, to whom she built a monument at Arelate.
- Gaius Precilius Threptus, buried at Rome, was the patron of Gaius Precilius Tropus.
- Lucius Precilius Trophimus, built a tomb for his patrons, Lucius Precilius Fortunatus, and Fortunatus' mother, Precilia Nice.
- Gaius Precilius Tropus, built a tomb at Rome for his daughter, and for his patron, Gaius Precilius Threptus.
- Precilia L. f. Truperia, a relative of Lucius Precilius Optatus, named in an inscription from Ostia.
- Quintus Praecilius Varicus, buried at Bulla Regia in Africa Proconsularis, aged fifteen.
- Quintus Praecilius Victor, brother of Praecilius Saturninus, buried at Rapidum in Mauretania Caesariensis, aged twenty-seven.
- Praecilius Vitalis, brother of Publius Praecilius Pollio and Praecilius Fidus.
- Lucius Precillius L. l. Zabda, a freedman named in an inscription from Rome.
- Lucius Praecilius Zosimus, father of Lucius Praecilius Sabinus.
- Praecilius Zoticus, father of Tiberius Claudius Praecilius Ligarius Magonianus.
- Tiberius Claudius Praecilius Ligarius Magonianus, son of Praecilius Zoticus, named in an inscription from Casinum in Latium.

== See also ==
- List of Roman gentes

== Bibliography ==
- Marcus Tullius Cicero, Epistulae ad Familiares.
- Dictionary of Greek and Roman Biography and Mythology, William Smith, ed., Little, Brown and Company, Boston (1849).
- Theodor Mommsen et alii, Corpus Inscriptionum Latinarum (The Body of Latin Inscriptions, abbreviated CIL), Berlin-Brandenburgische Akademie der Wissenschaften (1853–present).
- Notizie degli Scavi di Antichità (News of Excavations from Antiquity, abbreviated NSA), Accademia dei Lincei (1876–present).
- Giovanni Battista de Rossi, Inscriptiones Christianae Urbis Romanae Septimo Saeculo Antiquiores (Christian Inscriptions from Rome of the First Seven Centuries, abbreviated ICUR), Vatican Library, Rome (1857–1861, 1888).
- René Cagnat et alii, L'Année épigraphique (The Year in Epigraphy, abbreviated AE), Presses Universitaires de France (1888–present).
- George Davis Chase, "The Origin of Roman Praenomina", in Harvard Studies in Classical Philology, vol. VIII (1897).
- Hilding Thylander, Inscriptions du port d'Ostie (Inscriptions from the Port of Ostia, abbreviated IPOstie), Acta Instituti Romani Regni Sueciae, Lund (1952).
- John P. Bodel and Stephen V. Tracy, Greek and Latin Inscriptions in the USA: A Checklist, American Academy in Rome (1997).
