= Falerii =

Archaeological site in the province of Viterbo, Italy

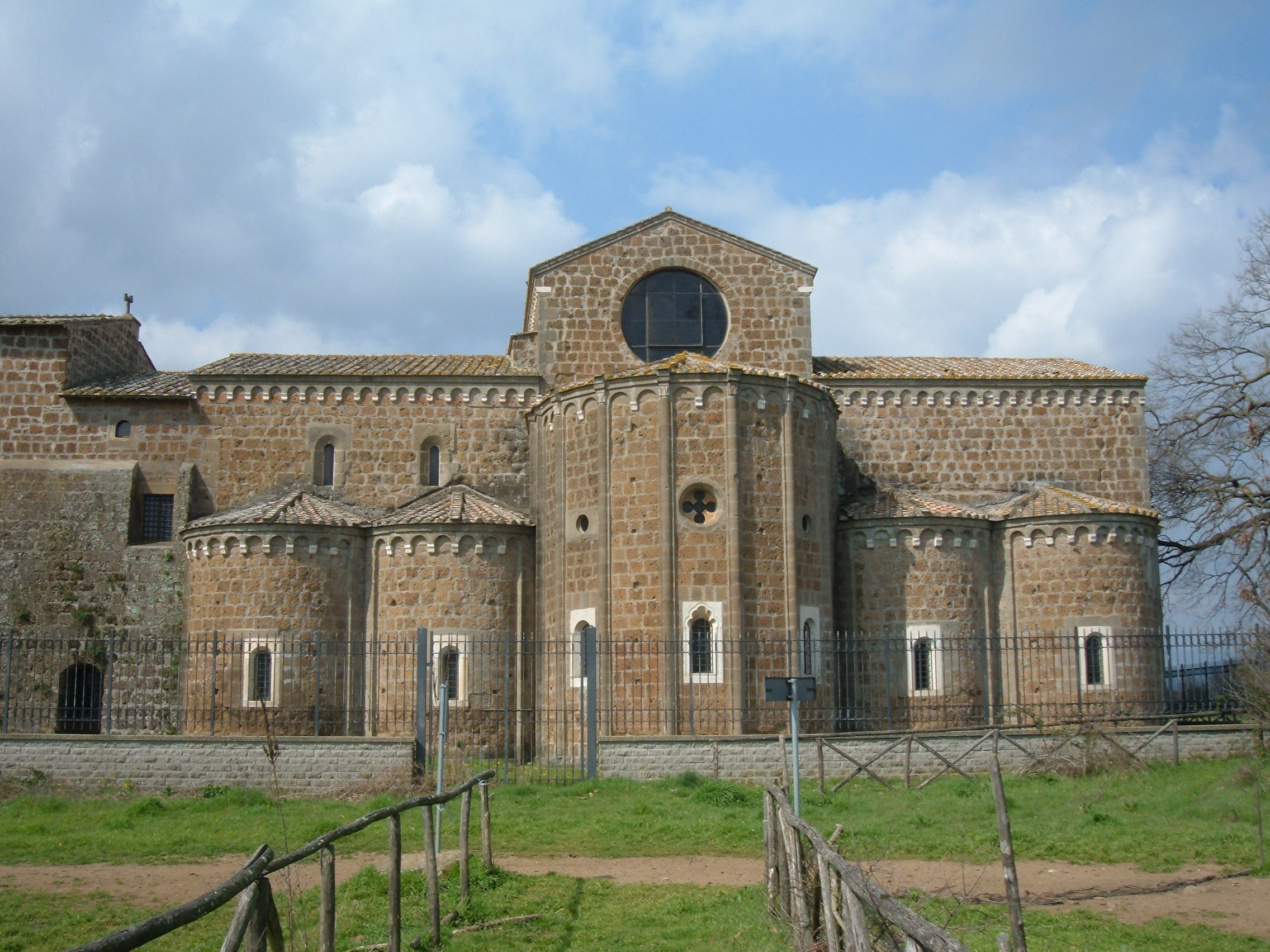
The apses of the church of Santa Maria di Falleri.

Falerii is a village in the municipality of Fabrica di Roma in the Province of Viterbo, Italy. Its name is better known for two nearby ancient cities, Falerii Veteres (old Falerii) and Falerii Novi (new Falerii).

Falerii Veteres, now Civita Castellana, was one of the chief cities of the duodecim populi of ancient Etruria. The site is about 2 km west of the course of the Via Flaminia, some 50 km north of Rome.

It was the main city of the Falisci, a people whose language was Faliscan and was part of the Latino-Faliscan language group. The Ager Faliscus (Faliscan Country), which included the towns of Capena, Nepet, and Sutrium, was close to the Monti Cimini.

== Location ==
The site of the original Falerii is a plateau, about 1100 × 400 m, not higher than the surrounding country (140 m) but separated from it by gorges over 60 m in depth, and only connected with it on the western side, which was strongly fortified with a mound and ditch. The rest of the city was defended by walls constructed of rectangular blocks of tuff of which some remains still exist.

== History ==
=== Founding ===
According to legend, Falerii Veteres was of Argive origin. Strabo's assertion that the population, the Falisci, were of a different race from the Etruscans is supported by the evidence of the inscriptions which have been found here. They were written in a Latin dialect. Most of the surviving inscriptions date back to the second half of the fourth century BC and the first half of the third century BC. The Faliscan language survived "the domination of the [surrounding] Etruscan culture, as well as, for a long time, the expansion of the Romans".

=== Conflicts with Rome ===
==== 5th century BC ====
Falerii was relatively close to Rome, and the Faliscans viewed the Romans as a threat to their security. For this reason, they supported the Etruscan cities of Veii and Fidenae (which was near Veii, on the other bank of the river) in their conflicts with Rome in the fifth century. Livy noted that: "As these two States [Falerii and the nearby Capena] were nearest in point of distance, they believed that if Veii fell they would be the next on whom Rome would make war". There had been a history of on-and-off conflicts between Rome and Veii, which often involved Fidenae. The Romans had placed a colony at Fidenae to garrison the city. In 437 BC Fidenae revolted, attacked the Roman settlers and sided with Veii. Roman envoys who were sent to Fidenae were killed on the order of the king of Veii. The Romans advanced on Fidenae. The Faliscans sent troops in support. The Veientes and Fidenates (the inhabitants of Veii and Fidenae) wanted to prolong the war, but the Faliscans wanted a pitched battle. The Romans routed the combined enemy forces. In 436 BC the Romans raided the territory of Veii and Falerii, but did not attack the two cities. In 435 BC the Fidenates crossed into Roman territory to raid it and called in the army of Veii. Falerii did not want to renew the war. In 434 the Romans seized Fidenae. This alarmed Veii and Falerii. They sent envoys to the Etruscan League (a council of the twelve major Etruscan cities) for assistance, but the league refused to help Veii.

In 403 BC war broke out between Rome and Veii. The Romans began a siege which lasted until 396 BC when they seized and destroyed this city. In 402 BC Falerii and Capena bound themselves by an oath and sent troops to Veii. They attacked the smaller of the two Roman camps from the rear. The Veientes attacked the Roman siege works from the front. The lack of unity between the Roman commanders led to a rout of the Romans, and the capture of the smaller camp. Some Romans escaped to the larger camp and some withdrew to Rome.

==== 4th century BC ====
In 400 BC the Romans recaptured the lost camp, raided the territories of Falerii and Capena, but did not attack the two cities. In 399 BC Falerii and Capena sent troops to relieve Veii. The Romans made a sortie from their camp, put their forces to flight and pursued them killed many of their men. Soon after this a contingent was sent to raid the territory of Capena. It fell on the survivors of the battle and destroyed them. In 398 BC The Romans raided the territories of Falerii and Capena, "carried off huge spoils and left nothing untouched that iron or fire could destroy". Livy mentioned Roman campaigns against Veii, of Falerii, and of Capena in 397 BC, but did not give any details. He wrote that the campaign at Veii was indecisive. In that year the Etruscan League held a council "where the Capenates and Faliscans proposed that all the nations of Etruria should unite in a common resolution 'and design to raise the siege of Veii." However, the request was refused because Veii had not consulted the other Etruscan cities "for advice in so weighty a matter." Moreover, "[t]here was now in the greatest part of Etruria a strange race, new settlers, with whom they were neither securely at peace nor yet certain to have war." This must have been a reference to the Gauls who had invaded northern Italy, close to Etruria. The council allowed Etruscan men to volunteer to serve in the war and many men did so. In 396 BC two Roman commanders marched against Falerii and Capena. However, they were poor commanders and fell into an ambush. One of them fell and the other withdrew. There was a rumour that Faliscans and Capenates were advancing and getting close to Veii "with the whole military strength of Etruria." This caused panic in Rome. This led to a Roman push at Veii, which was captured and destroyed. In 395 BC the Romans conducted operations against Falerii and Capena. They did not attack the cities. They ravaged the countryside and "despoiled the farmers of their possessions, leaving not one fruit-tree in the land nor any productive plant." Capena sued for peace, but the war with Falerii continued.

In 394 BC the war with Falerii was entrusted to Marcus Furius Camillus. He forced the Faliscans to come out of their town by ravaging the fields and burning the farmhouses. They encamped only one mile from the town, on a spot which they thought was safe because it was difficult to access. Guided by Faliscan prisoners, Camillus placed himself in a superior position near the camp. Enemy forces which tried to hinder the work were routed and the Faliscans fled back to their city. Camillus proceeded to besiege it. The town had plenty of food supplies and the siege seemed a prolonged affair. The inhabitants carried on with their usual lives and their boys went to school. The Faliscans had adopted the Greek practice of entrusting their boys to one tutor. This tutor decided to betray the town. He led the boys out of the town daily to exercise them. At first he kept them close to the city walls. Then he ventured further out. Eventually he reached the Roman outposts and handed the boys to the enemy. He communicated to Camillus his intention to betray Falerii. Camillus ordered that the man be stripped, scourged, and driven back into the city by the boys. When the Faliscans saw the tutor coming back in this fashion, they admired the righteousness of Camillus and sent envoys to him, "entrusting him with their lives and fortunes". Camillus sent them to Rome and they told the senate that "the Romans, by esteeming righteousness above victory, had taught them to love defeat above freedom and considered themselves "vanquished in virtue". According to Livy they also promised fidelity to Roman rule. The senate entrusted the matter to Camillus who demanded the town to pay the wages of the Roman soldiers for that year. In Livy's account, he granted peace; in Plutarch's account, he "established friendship with all the Faliscans". He then went back to Rome.

In 359 BC, war broke out between Rome and the Etruscan city-state of Tarquinii because the latter plundered Roman territory adjoining Etruria. In 357 BC, Faliscan men joined the Tarquinenses and refused to hand back Roman prisoners they had taken to Falerii. Livy wrote that the consul Gnaeus Manlius accomplished very little and mentioned that he was encamped at Sutrium, in Faliscan territory. In 356 BC, the Romans engaged the Faliscans and Tarquinenses. The priests of the latter rushed towards the Romans carrying snakes and torches. This dismayed the Roman soldiers, who fled to their rampart. They were mocked by their officers and they rushed against the enemy, routed them and seized their camp. All Etruscans then rose in arms led by Tarquinii and Falerii and advanced as far as the Roman salt works at the mouth of the River Tiber. The Romans crossed the river on rafts. They caught straggling pillagers in the fields and seized the enemy camp by surprise. The enemy was driven out of Roman territory. In 365 BC, another Etruscan city, Caere, joined Tarquinii. It was defeated and granted a 100-year truce. The Faliscans were accused of participating in the war and the brunt of the war was turned against them. The Romans could not find their forces and pillaged their land. In 351 BC the Romans conducted a campaign against Tarquinii and Falerii, ravaging their fields until their resistance was broken. The two city-states requested a truce and a forty-year truce was granted. In 342 BC, the Roman victory over the Samnites in the First Samnite War (344-342 BC) induced Falerii to ask Rome to convert their forty years' truce into a permanent treaty of peace.

==== 3rd century BC ====
In the first years of the Third Samnite War (298-290 BC), when Etruscan city-states rose against Rome, the Faliscans remained loyal to Rome. In 298 BC, after a fight with Volaterrae, a city-state in northern Etruria, the Romans went to the Faliscan territory, left their baggage in Falerii and proceeded to ravage enemy territory. In 297 BC, envoys for the Faliscan cities of Sutrium, Nepete, and Falerii went to Rome to inform the Romans that the city assemblies of Etruria were discussing suing for peace. In 295 BC, before the Battle of Sentinum, where the Romans faced a combined force of Samnites, Etruscans, Umbrians and Senone Gauls, the Romans stationed a reserve army in Faliscan territory. However, in 293 BC, the Faliscans made common cause with the Etruscans and Rome declared war on them. They seized the city of Troilum and then took five strong fortresses by storm. The Faliscans sued for peace and were granted a one-year truce after paying an indemnity of 100,000 asses of bronze coinage and year's pay for the troops of the consul who campaigned in Etruria.

Falerii Veteres revolted against the Roman Republic in 241 BC. The Roman consul Titus Manlius Torquatus was sent and during the first battle the Romans heavy infantry was defeated, but the Faliscan cavalry lost. The Romans won a second battle and the Faiscans' arms, cavalry, goods, slaves and half of their territory were confiscated. Later the town was destroyed and a new one built on a more accessible site.

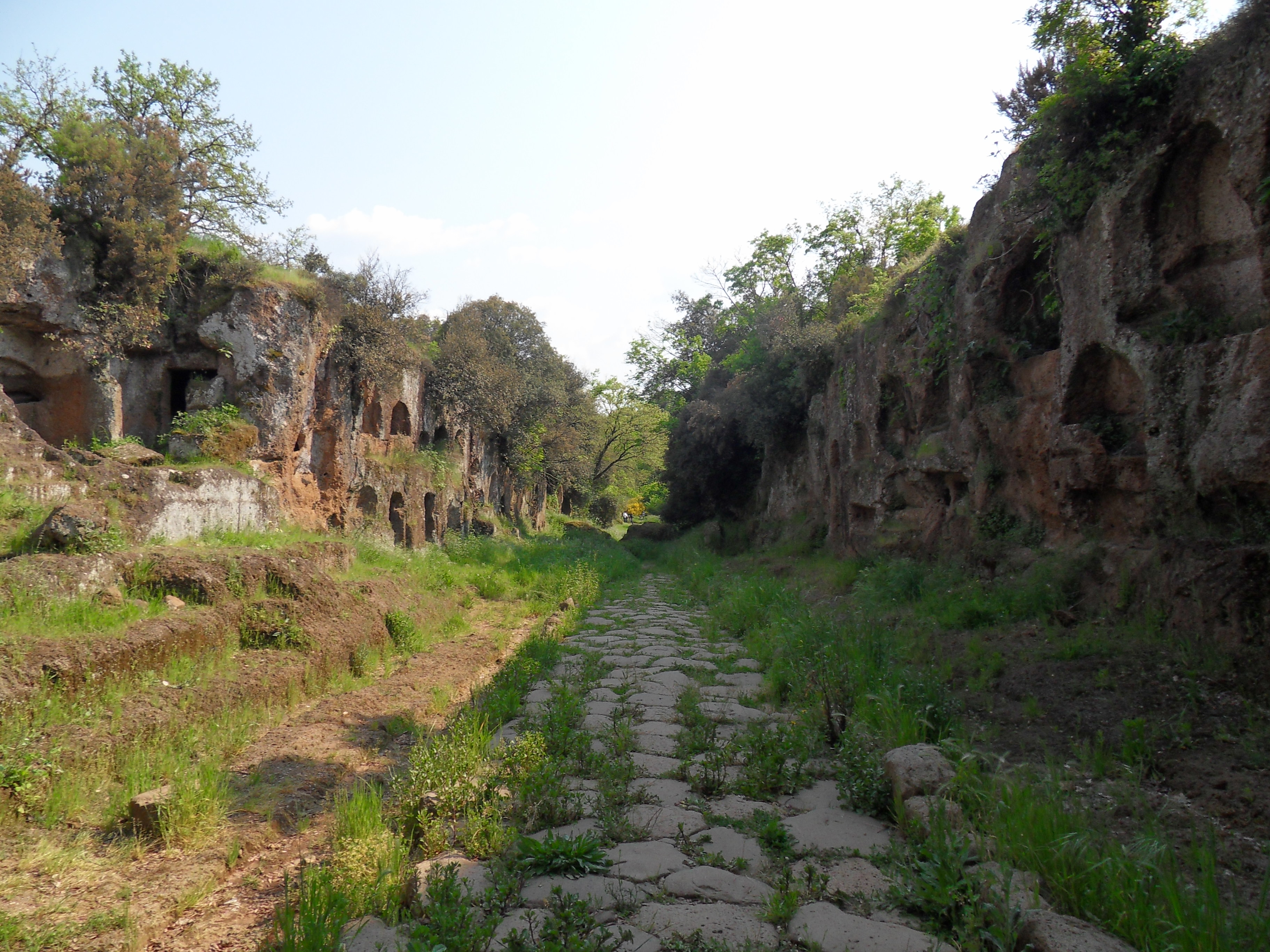
Tre ponti necropolis

== The site ==
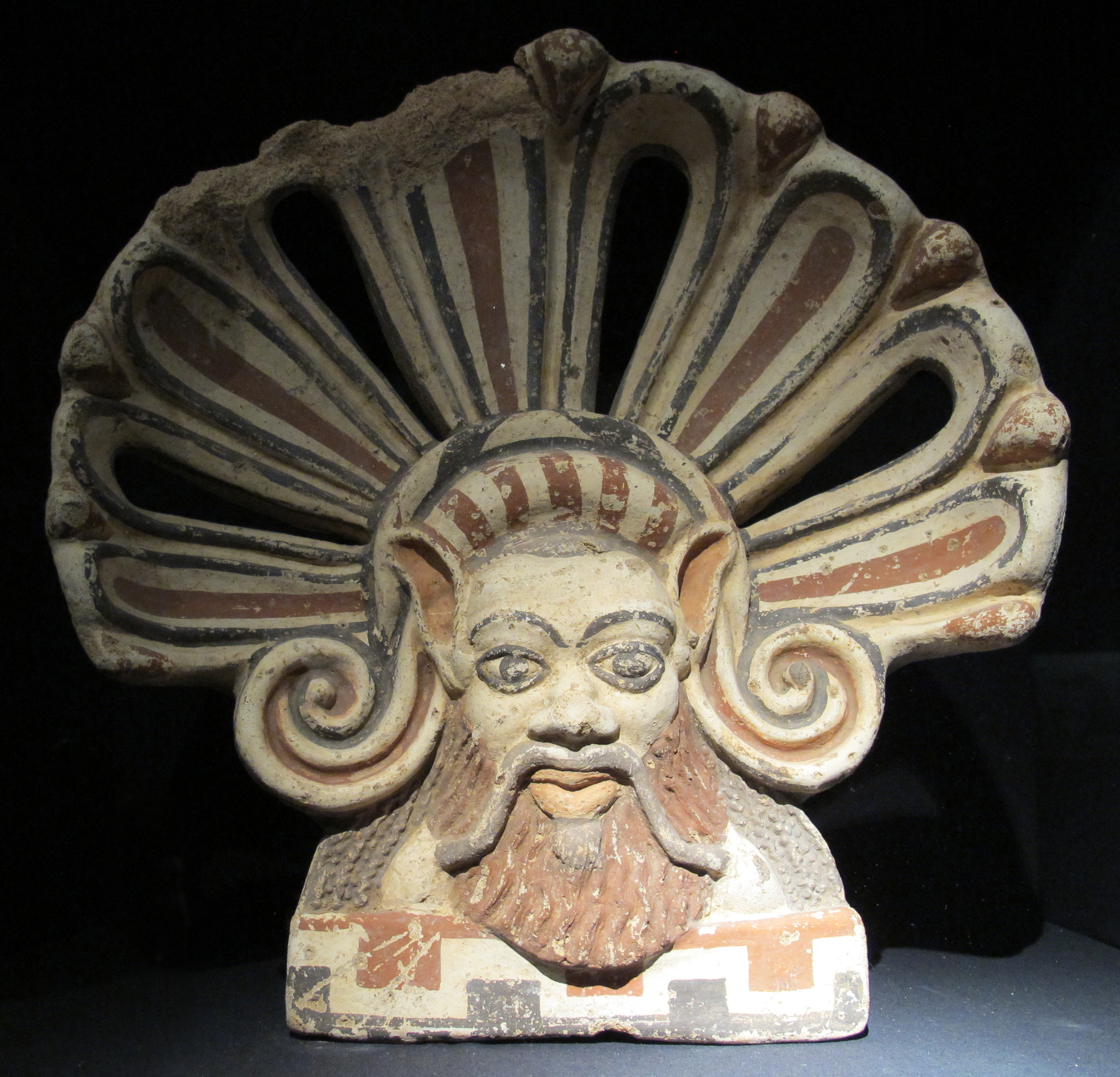
Terracotta antefix from Falerii Veteres, 5th century BC

Remains of a temple were found at Lo Scasato, at the highest point of the ancient town, in 1888, and others have been excavated in the outskirts. The attribution of one of these to Juno Quiritis is uncertain. These buildings were of wood, with fine decorations of coloured terracotta. Numerous tombs hewn in the rock are visible on all sides of the town, and important discoveries have been made in them; many objects, both from the temples and from the tombs, are in the Museo di Villa Giulia at Rome. Similar finds have also been made at Calcata, ten km to the south, and Corchiano, around ten km north-west.
