= Fascinus =

Phallic symbol in ancient Rome

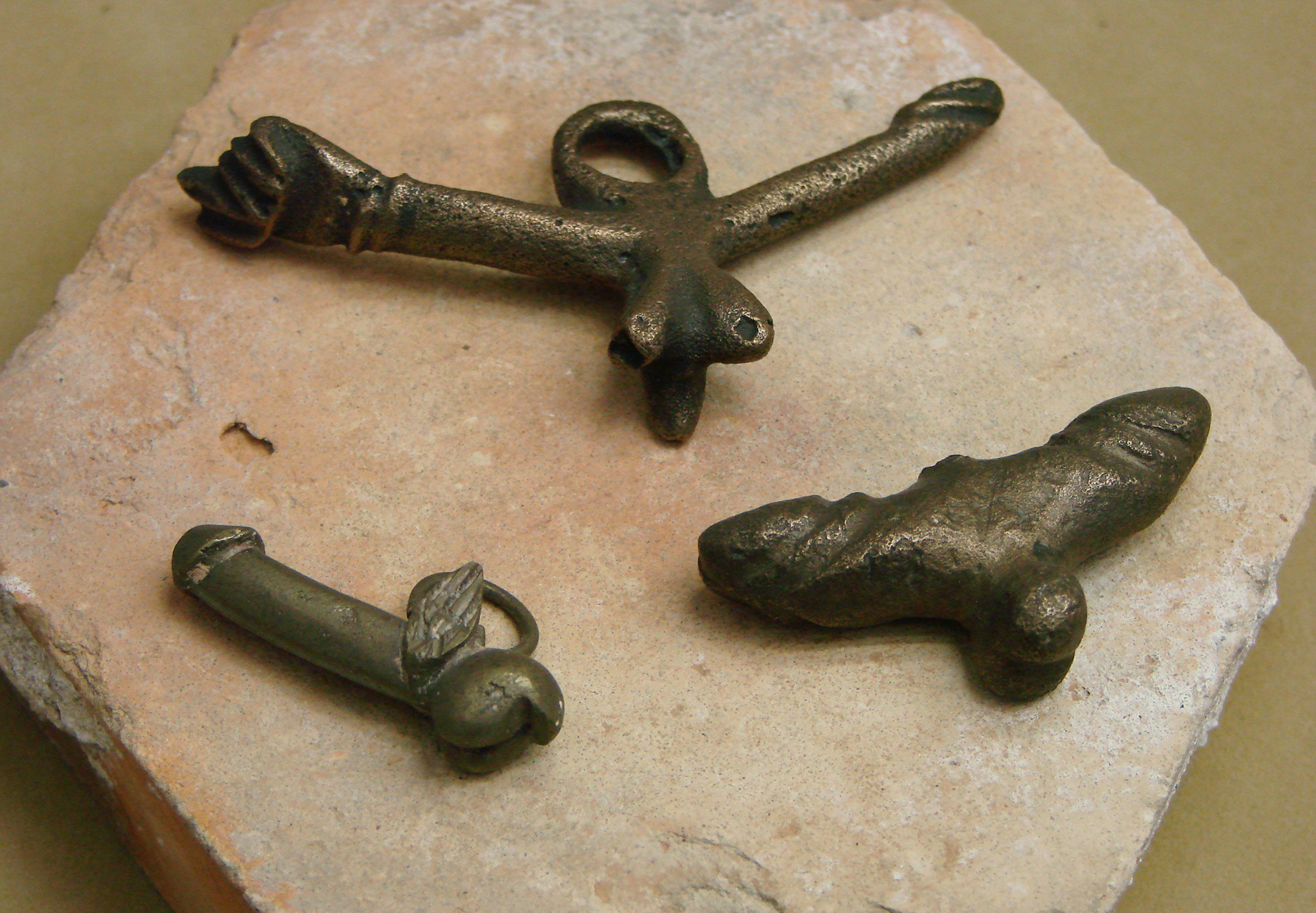
Gallo-Roman examples of the fascinum in bronze. The topmost is an example of the "fist and phallus" amulet with a manus fica.

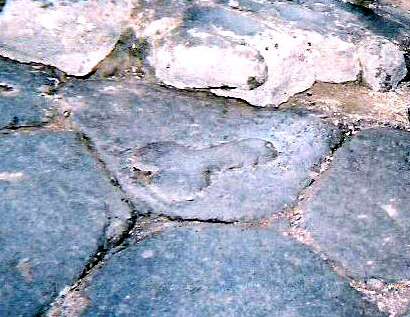
Phallus inscribed on a paving stone at Pompeii

In ancient Roman religion and magic, the fascinus or fascinum was the embodiment of the divine phallus. The word can refer to phallus effigies and amulets, and to the spells used to invoke his divine protection. Pliny called it a medicus invidiae, a "doctor" or remedy for envy (invidia, a "looking upon") or the evil eye.

== Etymology ==
The English word fascinate ultimately derives from Latin fascinum and the related verb fascinare, "to use the power of the fascinus", that is, "to practice magic" and hence "to enchant, bewitch". Catullus uses the verb at the end of Carmen 7, a hendecasyllabic poem addressing his lover Lesbia; he expresses his infinite desire for kisses that cannot be counted by voyeurs nor "fascinated" (put under a spell) by a malicious tongue; such bliss, as also in Carmen 5, potentially attracts invidia.

Fescennine Verses, the satiric and often lewd songs or chants performed on various social occasions, may have been so-named from the fascinum; ancient sources propose this etymology along with an alternative origin from Fescennia, a small town in Etruria.

== Public religion ==
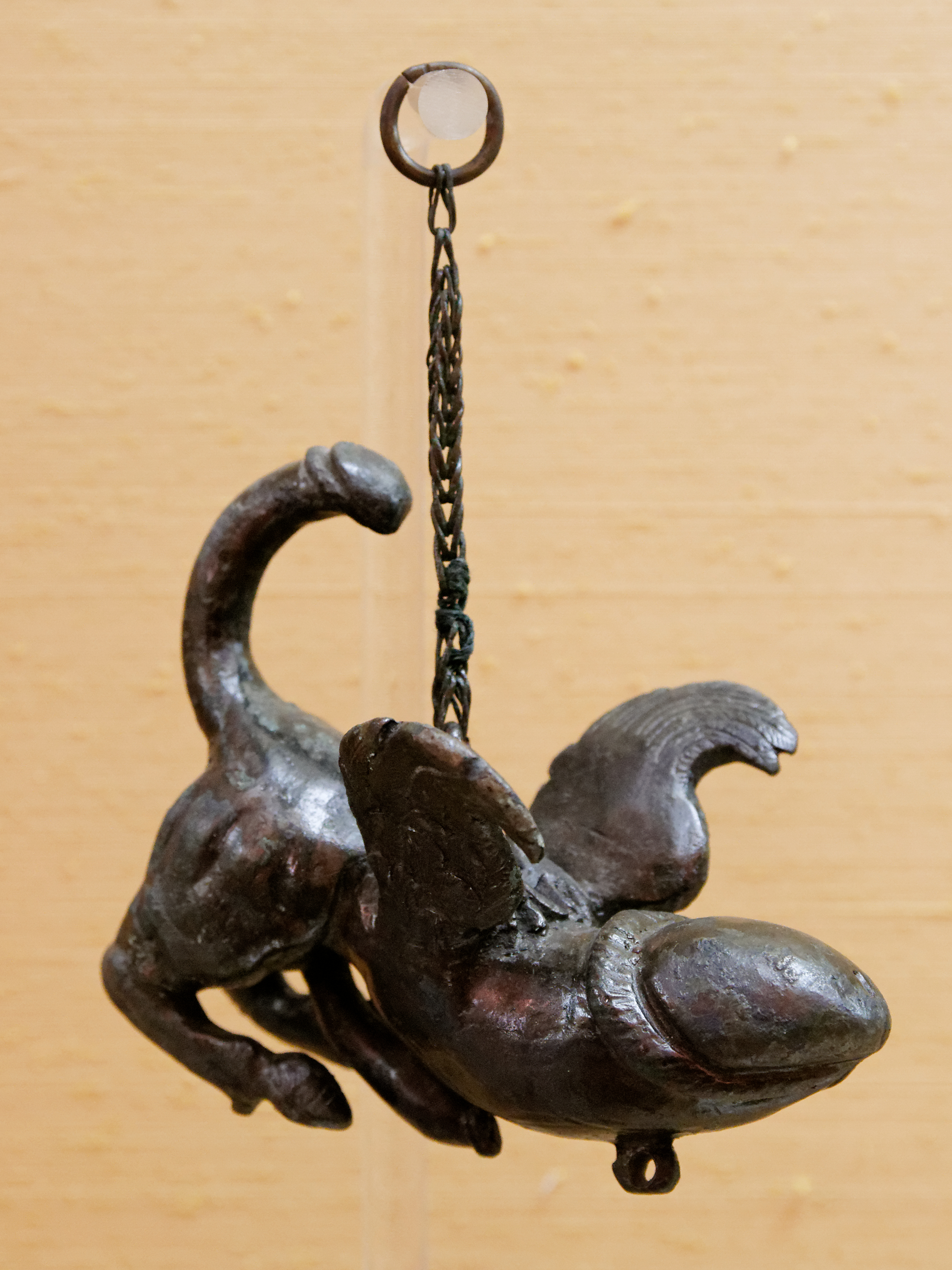
Fascinus from Pompeii showing a phallus

The Vestal Virgins tended the cult of the fascinus populi Romani, the sacred image of the phallus that was one of the tokens of the safety of the state (sacra Romana). It was thus associated with the Palladium. Roman myths, such as the begetting of Servius Tullius, suggest that this phallus was an embodiment of a masculine generative power located within the hearth, regarded as sacred. When a general celebrated a triumph, the Vestals hung an effigy of the fascinus on the underside of his chariot to protect him from invidia.

Augustine, whose primary source on Roman religion was the lost theological works of Marcus Terentius Varro, notes that a phallic image was carried in procession annually at the festival of Father Liber, the Roman god identified with Dionysus or Bacchus, for the purpose of protecting the fields from fascinatio, magic compulsion:

Varro says that certain rites of Liber were celebrated in Italy which were of such unrestrained wickedness that the shameful parts of the male were worshipped at crossroads in his honour. … For, during the days of the festival of Liber, this obscene member, placed on a little trolley, was first exhibited with great honour at the crossroads in the countryside, and then conveyed into the city itself. … In this way, it seems, the god Liber was to be propitiated, in order to secure the growth of seeds and to repel enchantment (fascinatio) from the fields.

As a divinized phallus, Fascinus shared attributes with Mutunus Tutunus, whose shrine was supposed to date from the founding of the city, and the imported Greek god Priapus.

== As a magic symbol ==
Phallic charms, often winged, were ubiquitous in Roman culture, appearing as objects of jewellery such as pendants and finger rings, relief carvings, lamps, and wind chimes (tintinnabula). Fascinus was thought particularly to ward off evil from children, mainly boys, and from conquering generals (see n. 6). The protective function of the phallus is usually related to the virile and regenerative powers of an erect phallus, though in most cases the emotion, shame, or laughter created by obscenity is the power that diverts the evil eye.

There are very few Roman images of people wearing a phallic charm. Varro notes the custom of hanging a phallic charm on a baby's neck, (Note: Varro, On the Latin language, VII.97) and examples have been found of phallus-bearing rings too small to be worn except by children. A 2017 experimental archaeology project suggested that some types of phallic pendant were designed to remain pointing outwards, in the direction of travel of the wearer, in order to face towards any potential danger or bad luck and nullify it before it could affect the wearer. Other symbols may have been interchangeable with the phallus, such as the club of Hercules.

The victory of the phallus over the power of the evil eye may be represented by the phallus ejaculating towards a disembodied eye. This motif is shown in several examples of Roman art. For example, the motif is known from multiple relief sculptures from Leptis Magna in present-day Libya, as well as several instances on Hadrian's Wall. A 1st-century BC terracotta figurine shows "two little phallus-men sawing an eyeball in half".

The "fist and phallus" amulet was prevalent amongst soldiers. These are phallic pendants with a representation of a (usually) clenched fist at the bottom of the shaft, facing away from the glans. Several examples show the fist making the manus fica or "fig sign", a symbol of good luck. The largest known collection comes from Camulodunum. Some examples of the fist-and-phallus amulets incorporate vulvar imagery as well as an extra apotropaic device.

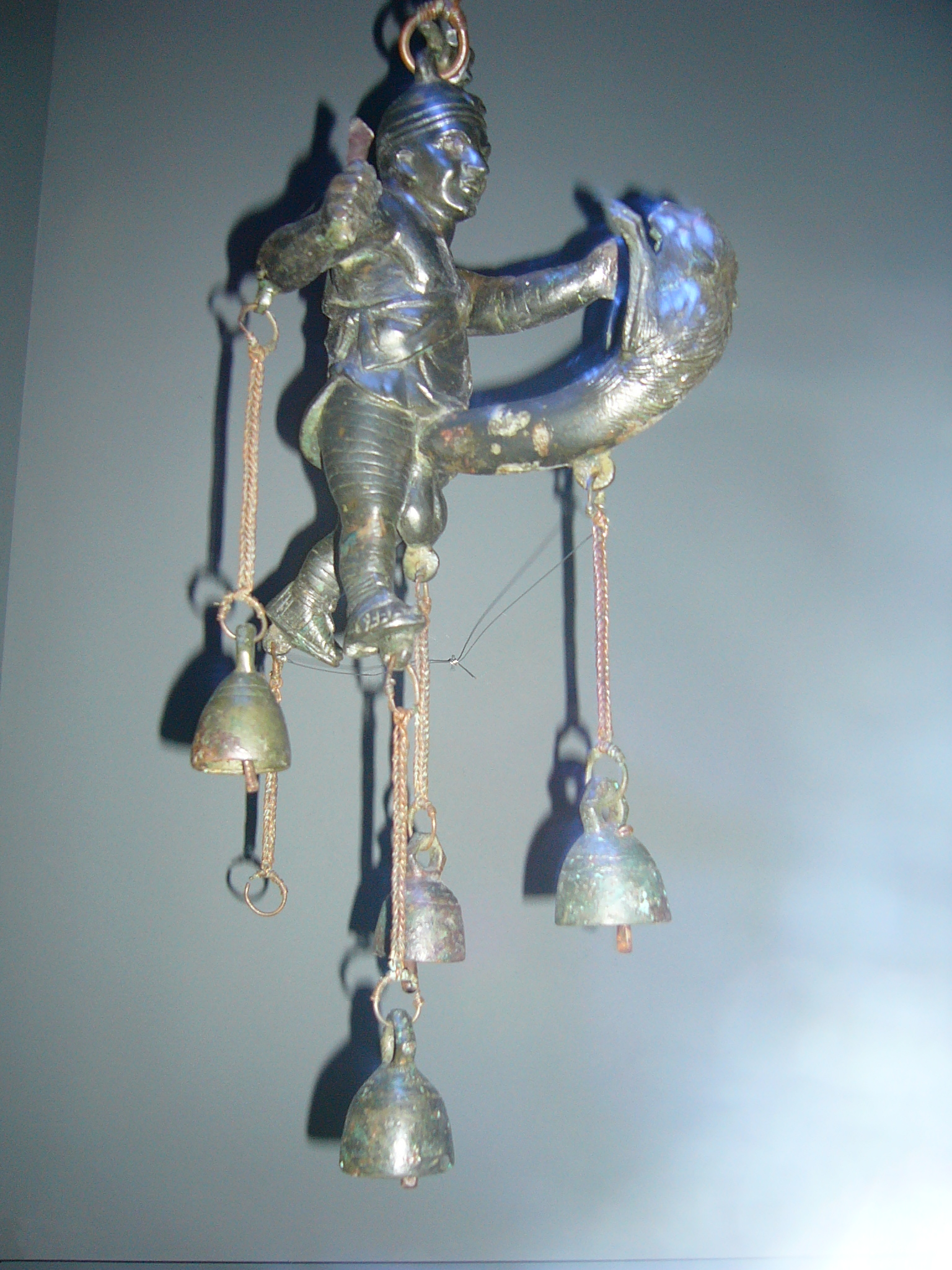
A tintinnabulum from Herculaneum (Italy), with the phallus as a beast which the human male engages in combat.

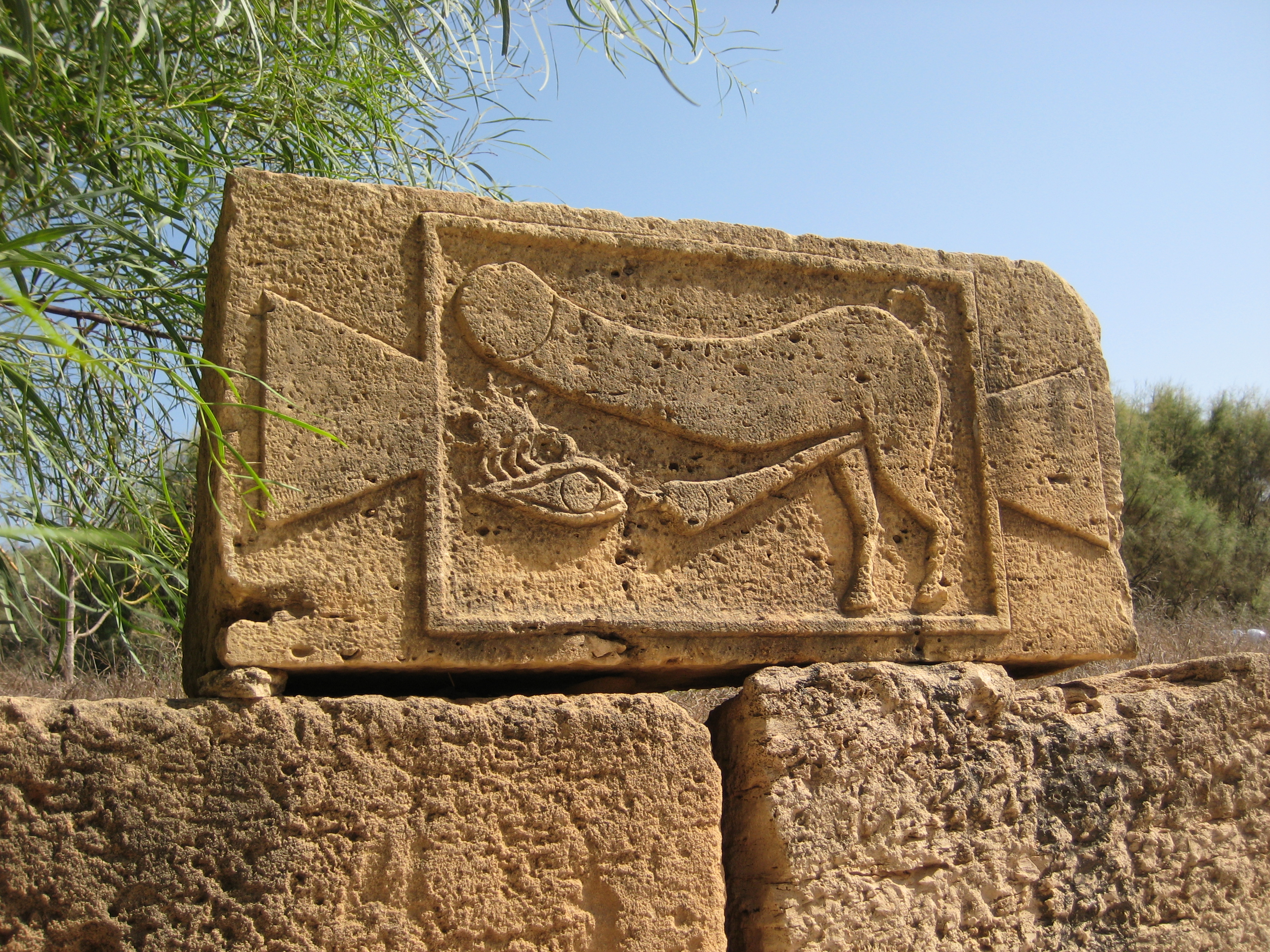
Bas-relief of a legged phallus ejaculating into an evil eye on which a scorpion sits, from Leptis Magna (Libya).

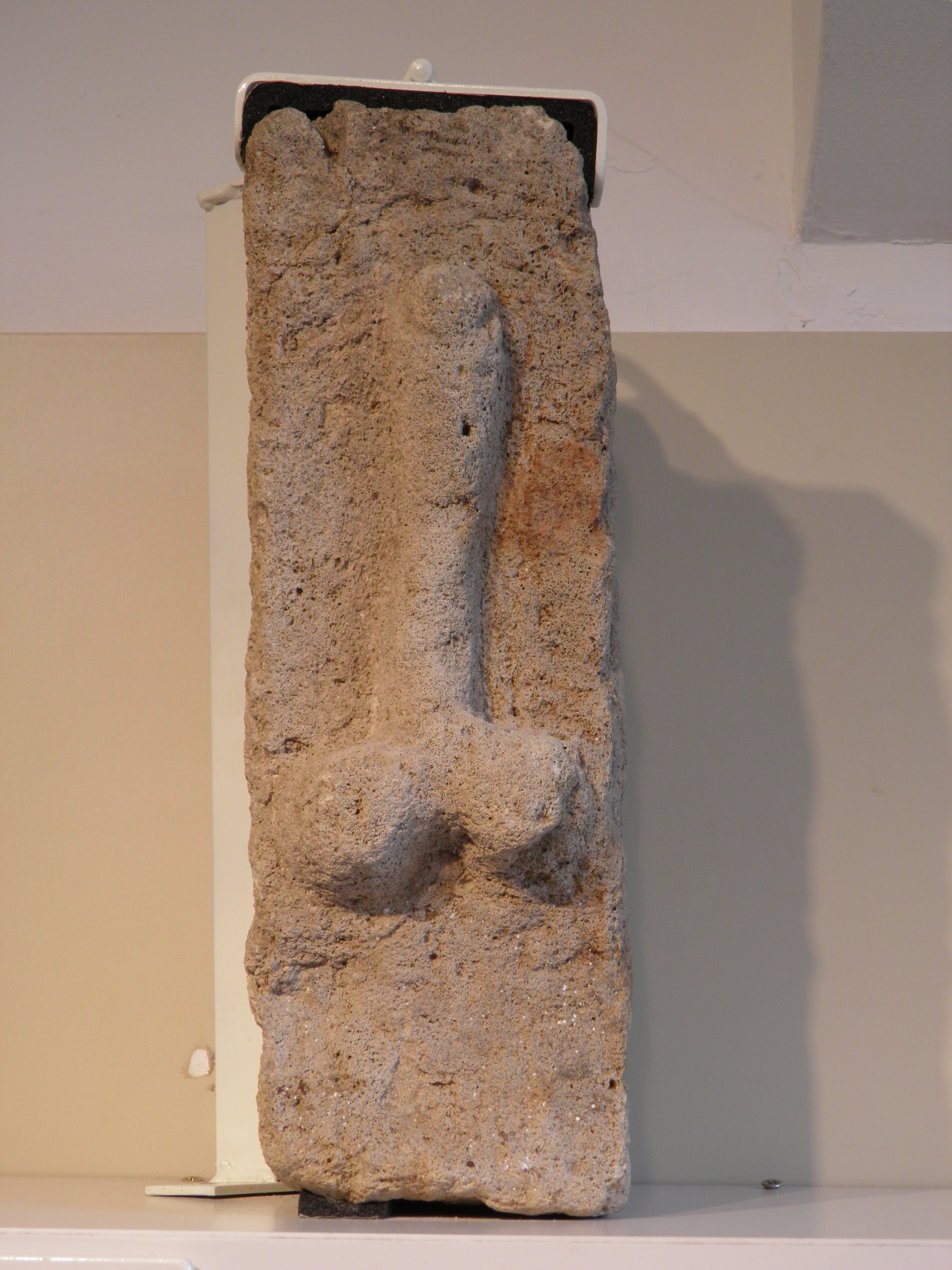
A simple phallic relief from Eboracum (York, UK).

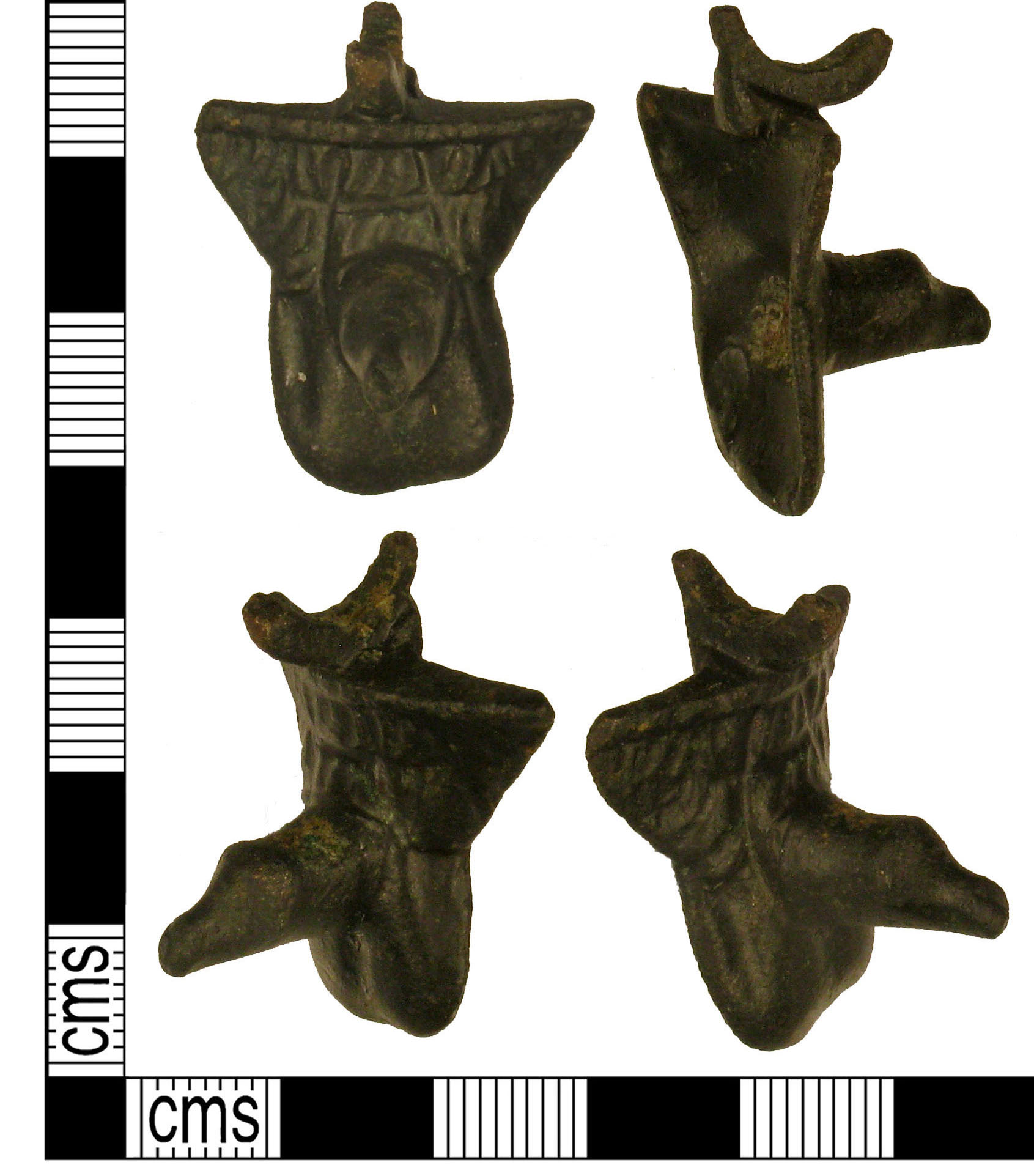
A phallic pendant from Kent (UK).

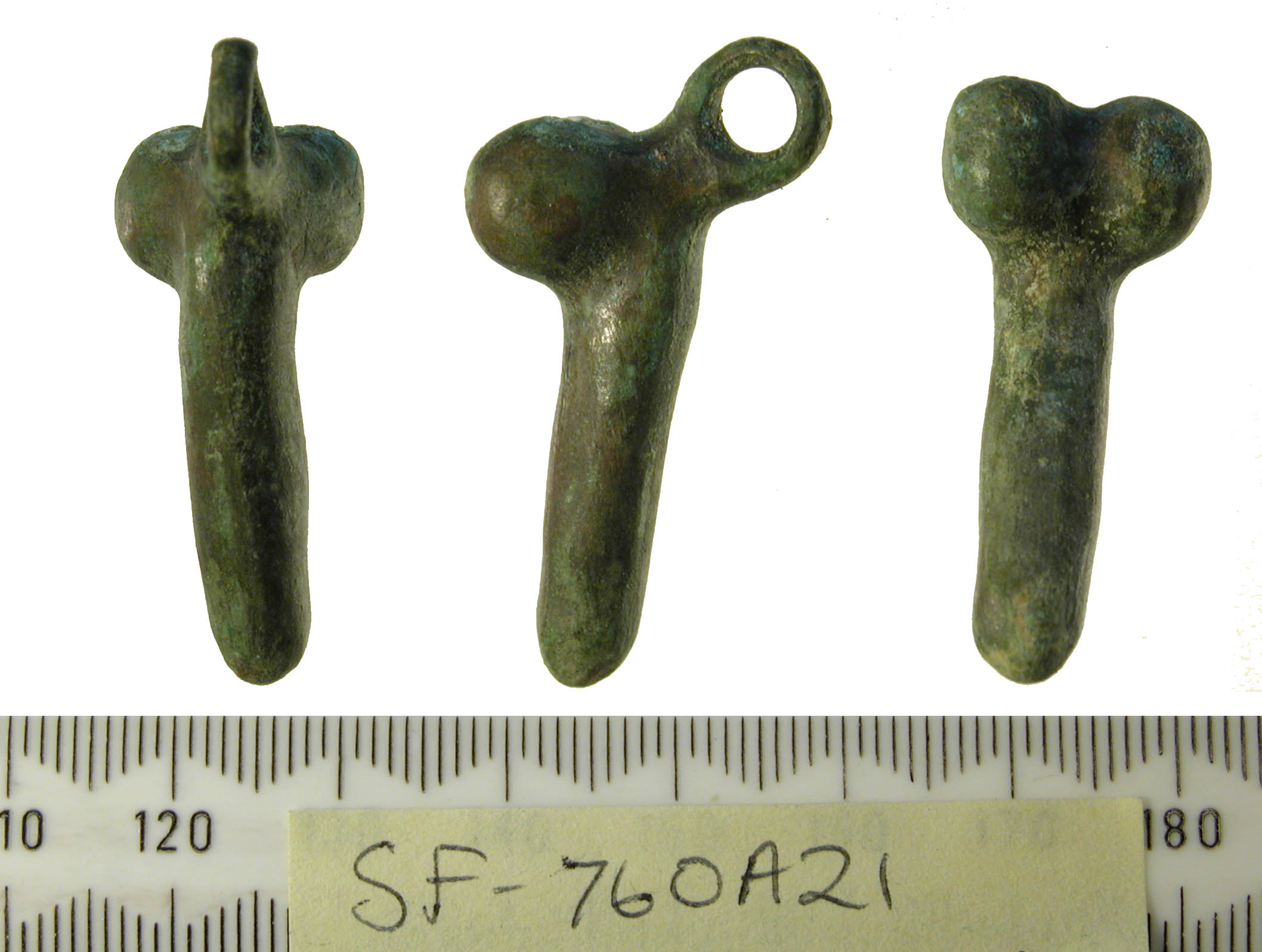
A simple phallic pendant from Suffolk (UK).

== See also ==
- Lingam
- Venus figurine
