= Titus Annianus =

Ancient Roman poet

Titus Annianus was a poet of ancient Rome, who lived in the time of the emperors Trajan and Hadrian, and wrote erotic or light verse (ludicra carmina), possibly in the Faliscan language.

Annianus was a friend of Aulus Gellius, who says of Titus that he was tremendously knowledgeable about ancient literature and the rules of language. He claimed to Aulus Gellius to have been a pupil of Marcus Valerius Probus. Among other things, he appears to have written (somewhat ribald) Fescennine Verses. Based on the information that Gellius provides, modern scholars consider this Annianus to be the author of a number of verses that the grammarian Terentianus ascribes to an anonymous Faliscan poet.

Aelius Festus Aphthonius (via the grammarian Gaius Marius Victorinus, whose work Aphthonius's was often appended to) mentions Annianus as the author of a Faliscum carmen. (Whether Terentianus and Aphthonius meant the poet wrote in the Faliscan language, or was an ethnic Falisci, or both, is uncertain.)

The few verses of Annianus' that survive seem to be dedicated to pastoral country life and viniculture, and it is supposed that these are overall reflective of his body of work, as in his short description, Aulus Gellius depicts Annianus as harvesting grapes.

Annianus is likely identical with the "Annianus Faliscus" mentioned by Ausonius as writing Fescennine Verses in Hadrian's time.
