= Falisci =

Ancient Italic people

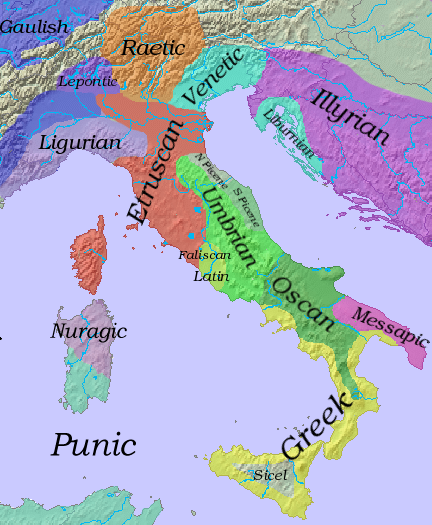
Map of early Italic and surrounding languages.

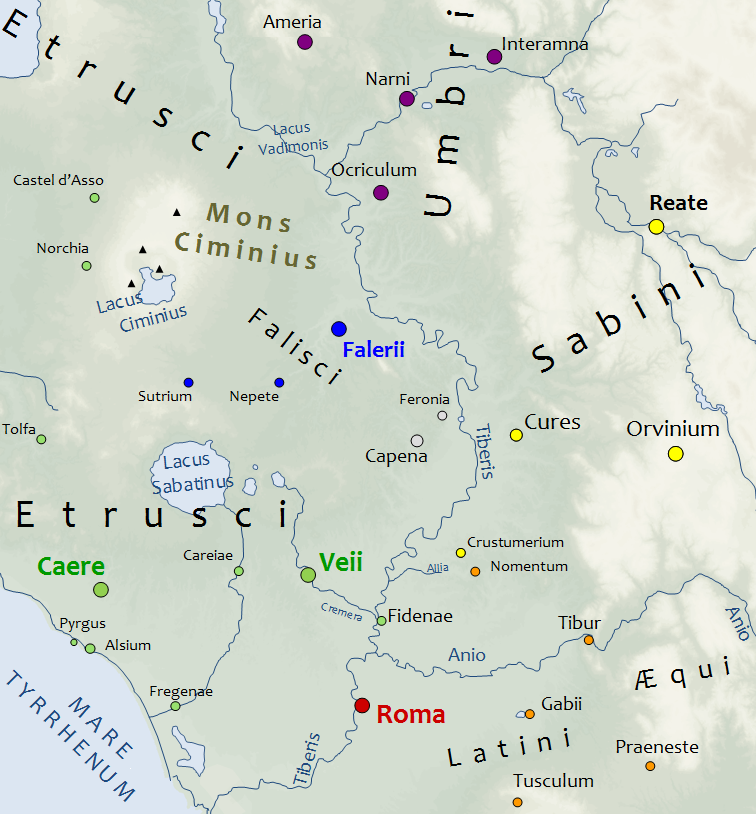
Map c. 450 BC

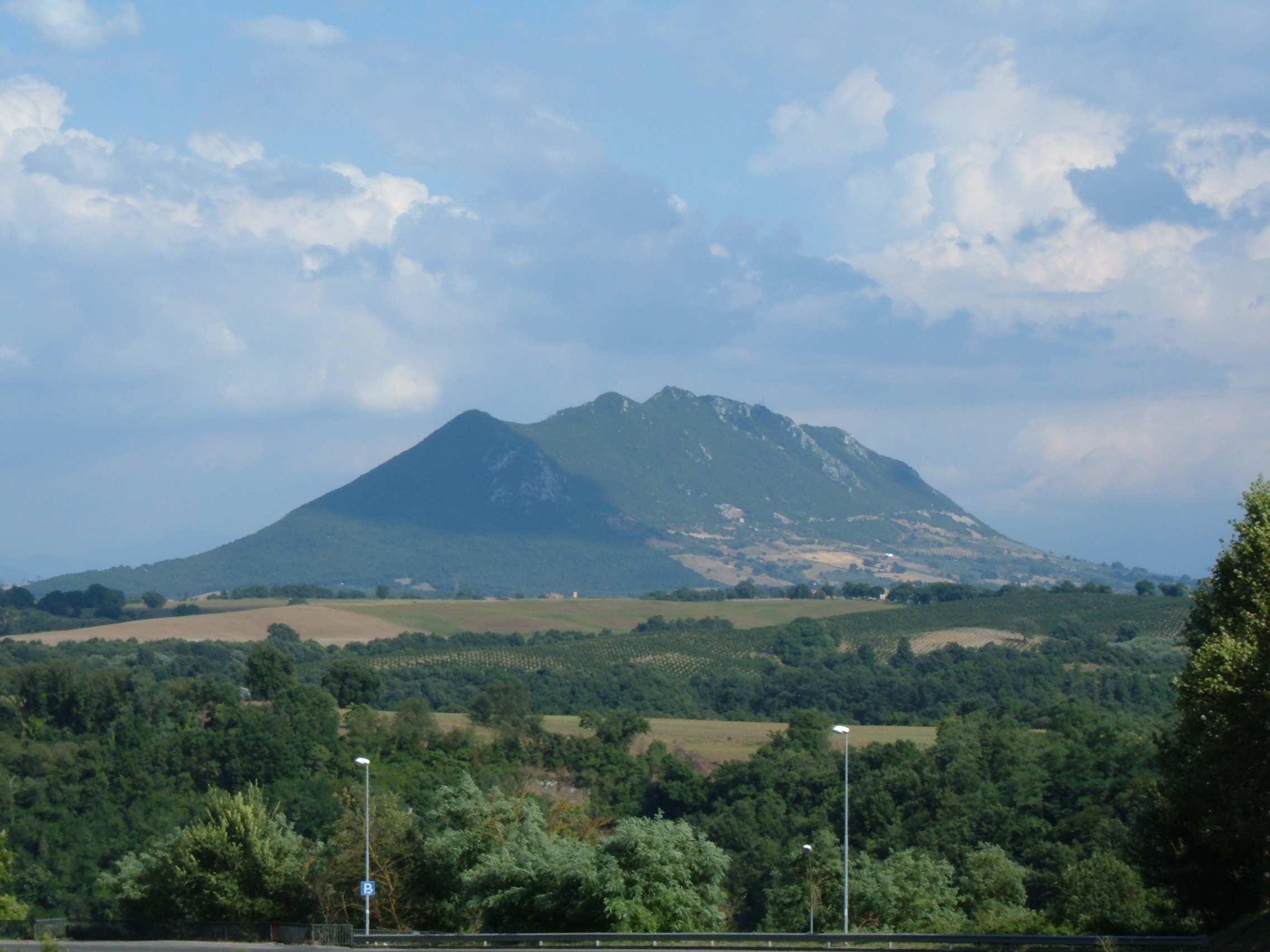
View from the general vicinity of Falerii to Monte Soratte on the southern border.

The Falisci (Note: Falisci is the ancient Roman exonym.) were an Italic tribe who lived in what is now northern Lazio, on the Etruscan side of the Tiber Valley. They spoke an Italic language, Faliscan, closely related to Latin. Originally a sovereign state, politically and socially they supported the Etruscans, joining the Etruscan League. This conviction and affiliation led to their ultimate near destruction and total subjugation by Rome.

Only one instance of their own endonym has been found to date: an inscription from Falerii Novi from the late 2nd century AD refers to the falesce quei in Sardinia sunt, "the Faliscans who are in Sardinia", where falesce is the nominative plural case. An Etruscan inscription calls them the feluskeś. The Latin cannot be far different from the original name. The -sc- suffix is "distinctive of the Italic ethnonyms".

== Geography ==
The Falisci resided in a region called by the Romans the Ager Faliscus, "Faliscan Country", located on the right bank of the Tiber River between and including Grotta Porciosa in the north and Capena in the south. The 1st-century Roman writer Pliny the Elder and the 1st-century BCE Latin poet Horace both state that the Monte Soratte was within Faliscan territory; it likely functioned as the border between Faliscan country and Capenate territory. The land between Monte Soratte and the Tiber is of unclear ownership; although nearly all the 4th-3rd century BCE inscriptions from the area east of Monte Soratte are Faliscan, most scholars consider the land to have been part of the ager Capenas. To the west, the corners of the roughly square area were on the slopes of the Monti Sabatini in the south and the Monti Cimini in the north. Pollen samples from Lake Bracciano, Lake Monterosi and Lake Vico reveal that the montane forests, formed by oaks, were very dense until the 2nd century BC. According to the 1st-century BCE Roman historian Livy, the forest by Monti Cimini was dangerous for foreigners as of the 4th-century BCE; he claims that "not a single trader had, up to that time, ventured through it."

The arable land was contained within an enclosure of volcanic highlands and the Tiber River. The northern border of the enclosure went along the ridge of the Monti Cimini, the southern along the ridge connecting the Monti Sabatini and Monte Soratte, the western along the highlands connecting the two large volcanic lakes. The inner slopes are drained by streams pointing at the Tiber, which collect into converging canyons and finally into the canyon of the Treja river, which empties into the Tiber. These streams required an extensive network of bridges.

Most of the through traffic went along the Via Tiburtina on the west bank of the river, which could only be crossed south of Capena or at Grotta Porciosa in the north. There the Via Flaminia, earlier the Via Amerina, led inland into the country of the Umbrians via the valley of the Nar River. On the western side, the Via Cassia or its predecessor led to the coast over Sutri gap. The Falisci therefore prospered by being on a protected crossroad.

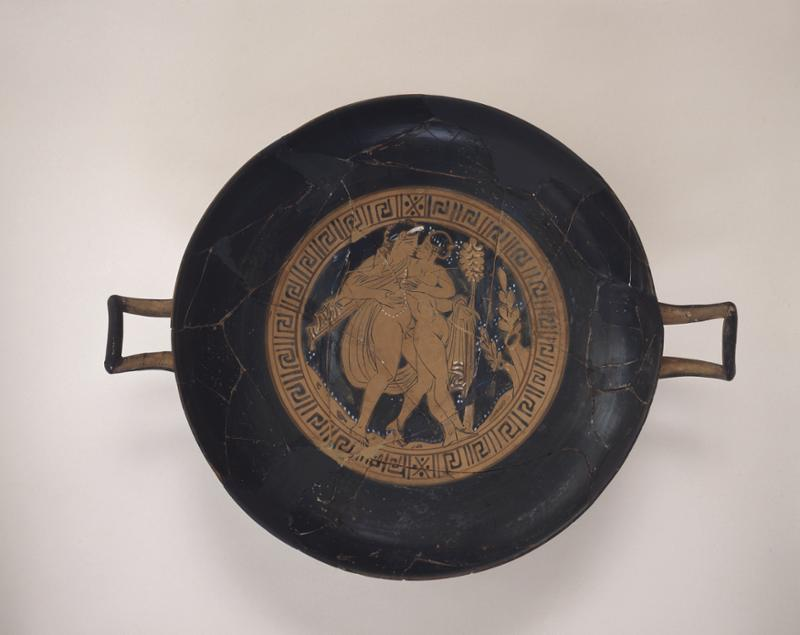
Red-figure lovers' kylix, 350 BC, Coste di Manone necropolis in the Tiber Valley, Faleri Veteres, Civita Castellana, Penn Museum, No. MS3444

The primary urban center in Faliscan territory was the city of Falerii, now the modern settlement of Civita Castellana. Falerii was situated at the conjunction of several small rivers from Monti Sabatini and the larger Treia river. Following the Roman conquest of 241 BCE, the city of Falerii was destroyed and the inhabitants were moved to the less defensible position of Falerii Novi. Another major city mentioned in ancient literature is Fescennium, which is said by Festus to be the origin site of the Roman wedding tradition known as the Fescennine verses. Other Faliscan cities unmentioned by the ancient sources include Corchiano, Vignanello, Gallese and Grotta Porciosa, and cultural influence on the archaeological area of Poggio Sommavilla in the Tiber valley in front of the Necropolis of Coste Manone and the "ford" of the Treja at the confluence of the Tiber.

== History ==
The Falisci, often allied with the Etruscans, resisted Rome for a long time. They were allied with Veii when it was defeated in 396 BC. In the aftermath, Falerii was occupied by the victorious Romans. When, in 358, Tarquinia rebelled, the Falisci again took arms against Rome, but were again crushed c. 351 BC. This time an alliance was signed between the contenders, and a Roman garrison was settled in Falerii.

The Falisci took advantage of the First Punic War to declare their independence, but their revolt ended in 241 BC with the death of 15,000 Falisci and the destruction of Falerii; the survivors were moved to a new city, Falerii Novi.

== Culture ==
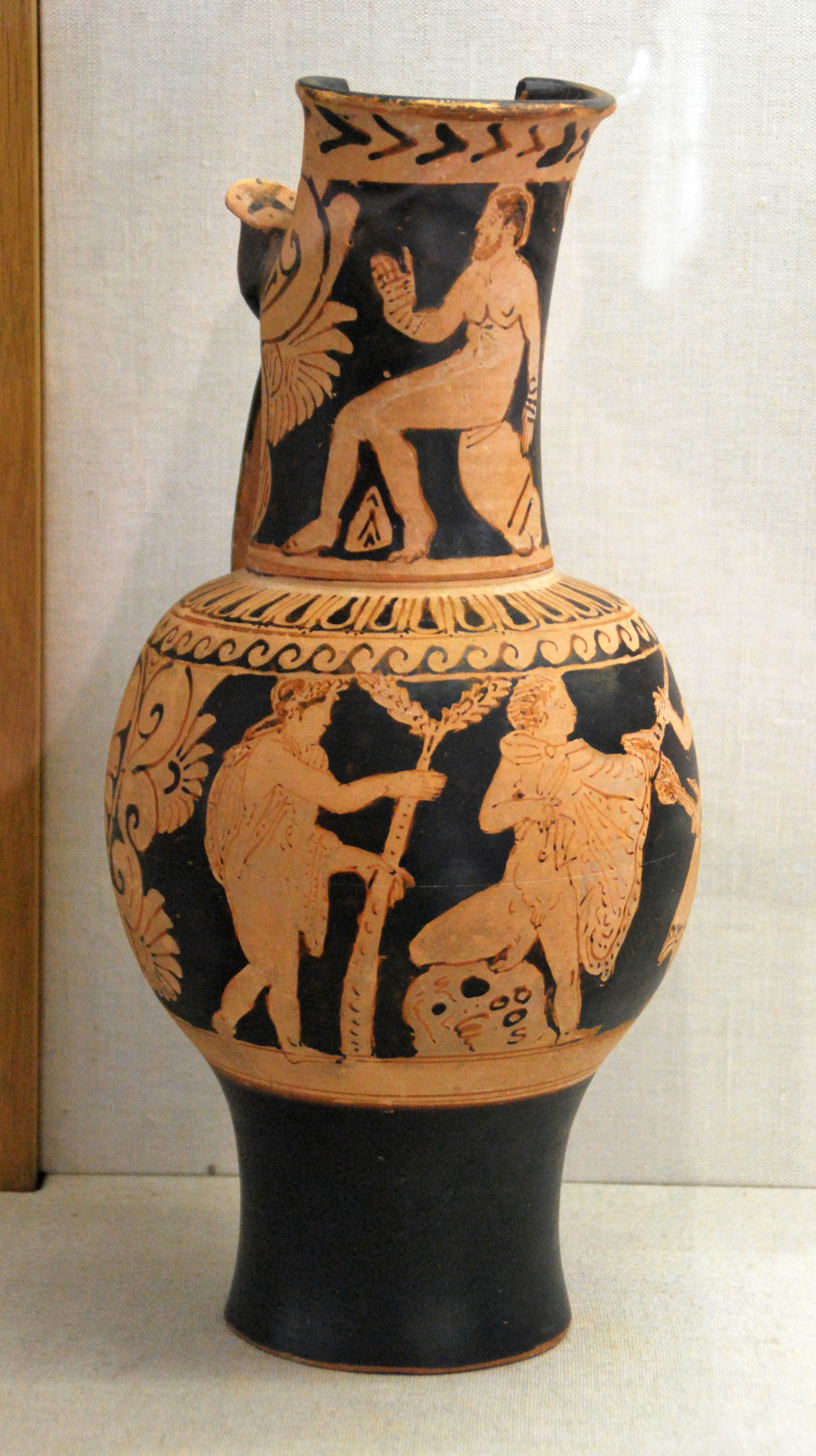
Faliscan red-figure flagon, attributed to the Fluid group c. 350/25 BC; now Antikensammlung Würzburg, inventory number L 813

It is unclear precisely how the Faliscans saw themselves and what characteristics they believed separated them from neighboring cultures. The only instance of the Falisci referring to their own ethnicity comes from a 2nd-century Latin inscription from Falerii Novi describing Faliscans in Sardinia: "falesce·quei·in·Sardinia·sunt." Ancient Roman authors sometimes equate the Falisci and the Etruscans; the 4th-century Latin writer Servius the Grammarian calls the city of Falerii a Tuscan city and Livy calls the Falisci an Etruscan people. The 1st-century BCE historian Dionysus of Halicarnassus claimed that Faliscan culture developed from earlier, supposedly Pelasgian, inhabitants of the region. However, the 1st-century BCE geographer Strabo notes that the Falisci differed from the Etruscans in numerous ways: "Some say that the inhabitants of Falerii are not Etruscans, but Faliscans, a distinct people; and some, too, that the Faliscans are a polis with a distinct tongue."

Dionysius describes Faliscan weaponry in his works, stating that their spears and bucklers resembled Greek equipment used in Argos. Dionysius likely intended this description to further support his proposed connection between Argos and the Falisci. He further claims that whenever the Faliscan army left their borders, they sent unarmed holy men ahead of the rest of the army carrying the terms of peace. Cato the Elder, a 3rd-century BCE Roman politician, mentions a type of cattle-stall called the praesepe Faliscum, although such a device was possibly not exclusive to the ager Faliscus.

=== Pottery ===
The Faliscans earned large quantities of black and red-figure pottery from trade with the Attic parts of Greece and immigration of Attic artisans. By the 4th-century BCE, the red-figure style became the predominant type of pottery in the ager Faliscus. During this same century, the city of Falerii experienced significant artistic development; 4th-century BCE pottery from Falerii demonstrates standardized design and highly technical craftsmanship. Vincent Jolviet studied Faliscan tombs and divided Faliscan red-figure pottery into two categories: the "Style ancien," which comprises pottery produced around 380 BCE, and the "Style récent," consisting of pottery made from 340-280 BCE. The ancient Faliscan style contained distinctly Faliscan characteristics such as the decorations under the handles, although it remained strongly influenced by its Attic origins. In contrast, the recent style shows greater evidence of technical differences from Attic pottery: decorations in the recent style were painted without relief-lines, using thin, rushed, and watery paint lines instead. Late Faliscan pottery contained volutes, tongue-decorations on the shoulders, and palmettes beneath the handles. Dionysian imagery, such as depictions of satyrs and maenads alongside birds, also became staples of late Faliscan pottery. Winged figures were used to fill up blank spaces easily, expediting the production process.

=== Social structure ===
The exact political mechanisms underpinning Faliscan society remain unclear due to limited archaeological evidence. Middle Faliscan inscriptions mention the political position of efiles, a term that may have emerged as a calque on the Latin word aedilis. Late Faliscan inscriptions from Falerii Novi (dated to after the Roman conquest) mention a cuestod (quaestor), a censor, several duouiri (Duumviri), and a pretod (praetor) that served a—possibly local—senate. The term rex, meaning "king," appears on the cursus honorum in a Middle Faliscan text. It is possible that this position performed religious duties, similar to the Roman Rex sacrorum. The title appears at the end of the cursus, indicating that these magistrates may have served for a limited duration of time or served periodically. Another possible explanation for this placement is that the office was not a part of the traditional Roman cursus honorum.

The usage of patronymic instead of matronymic filiations indicates that Faliscan society may have been somewhat patriarchal. There are several examples of Faliscan praenomina which are seemingly unique to Faliscan culture or are rare outside of the ager Faliscus; the names Iuna and Volta are included within this category, they are especially unique as they are masculine names with the ending -a. Other names such as Gaius and Gaia are much more common in Faliscan inscriptions than in other cultures. Instances of double gentillicum are found in a Middle Faliscan inscription containing the name uel[ · ]uisni · olna and in a Middle or Late Faliscan text containing the name m · tito · tulio · uoltilio · hescuna. In Etruscan culture, this naming convention was used to mark an individual as a freedman. One Middle Faliscan inscription from Falerii mentions a freedwoman named loụṛia who was inhumed in the same loculus as the freeborn fasies : c[ai]sia.

=== Literature ===
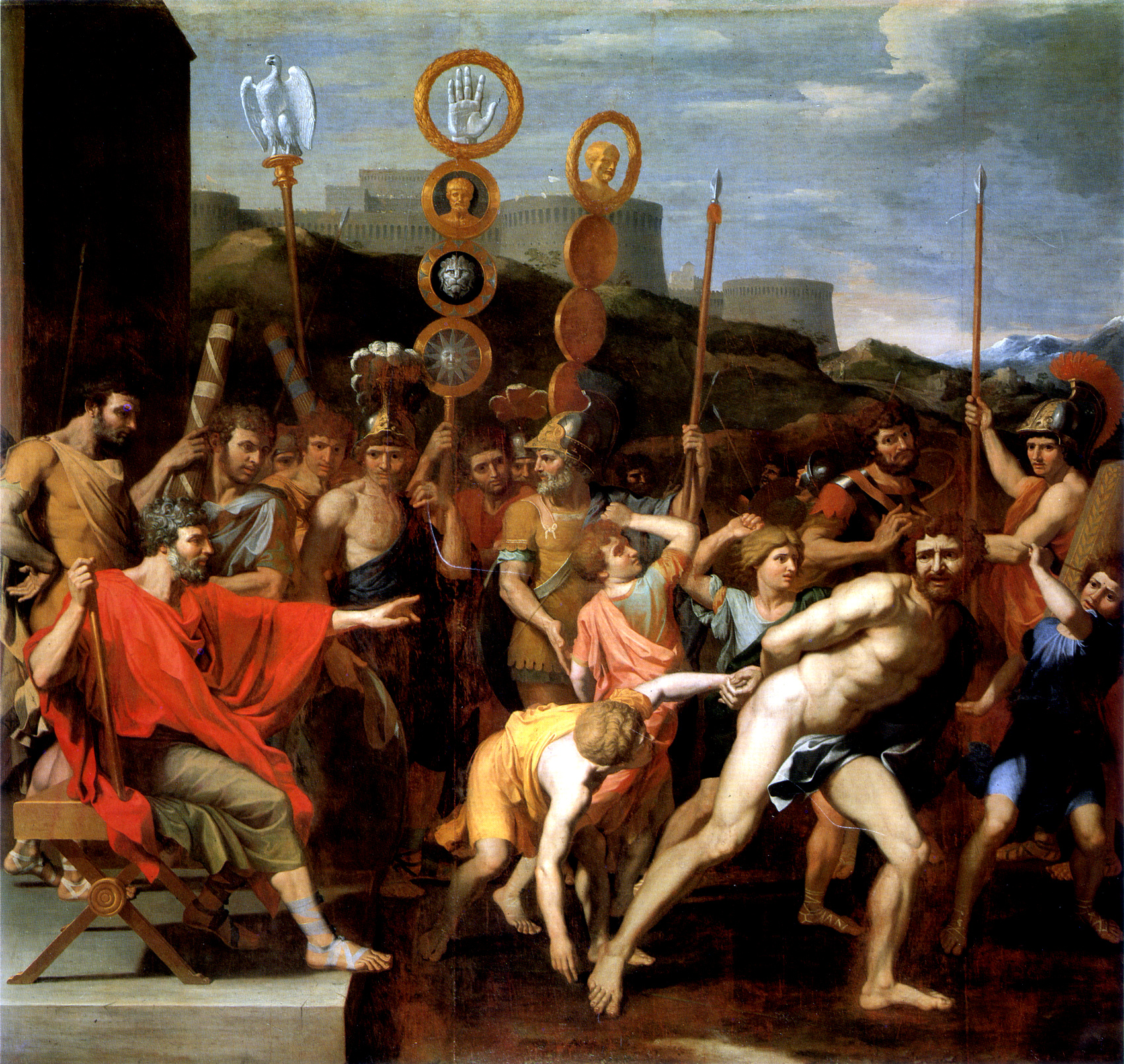
Painting of the Faliscan schoolmaster by 17th-century French painter Nicolas Poussin

Faliscan impasto pottery from the 7th-century BCE sometimes bear the signatures of their creators, a mark that possibly signified that the works were commissioned by individuals of high social-standing. Inscriptions such as those found on pottery, alongside the numerous other examples of Faliscan writing, suggest that some segments of the population were literate. Levels of literacy likely varied significantly between different social classes. The 1st-century BCE Roman historian Livy provides information on Faliscan schooling practices; he states that, like the Greeks, they placed several boys under the tutorship of one man who functioned as both the teacher and companion of the children. Livy recites a specific incidence of a well-educated schoolmaster who was entrusted with teaching the children of the local leaders. According to Livy, this man took his students outside the walls of the city of Falerii for play and exercise. During the war with the Romans, the teacher was said by Livy to have taken the students further and further from the walls each day, until he saw the opportunity to flee to the Roman camp with the children and surrendered them to the Roman general Camillus. Livy states that Camillus refused to accept the hostages, instead declaring that Falerii shall be conquered through Roman bravery and strategy; Camillus is said to have given the children rods and instructed them to lead the schoolmaster back to the city whilst beating him. Livy concluded by stating that the local Faliscan magistrates were so impressed by this display of Roman virtue, that they voluntarily surrendered themselves believing that they would live better under the Romans than their own laws. There is some evidence of a distinctly Faliscan literature; the Fescennine verses are attributed to the Faliscans and the metrum Faliscum (Faliscan meter) may also have been created by the Falisci, although the metrum Faliscum is attributed to an unknown author named Serenus by the 2nd-century Latin grammarian Terentianus. Servius states that several laws in the Twelve Tables derive from the Faliscans, although no original Faliscan laws have survived.

=== Funerary practices ===
Possibly the most uniquely Faliscan aspect of Faliscan material culture was their funerary rites. During the beginning of the 8th-century BCE, around the earliest periods of Faliscan history, they cremated their dead and stored the ashes in stone cists. By the last quarter of the 8th-century BCE, burial became more common for upper-class women while cremation remained common for upper-class men. Throughout the rest of the century, Faliscan burial practices evolved towards inhumation in trench or pit tombs and then the usage of sarcophagi. Sarcophagi were replaced with wooden caskets typically made from a hollowed tree trunk by the end of the century. Loculi—a specific type of burial niche—began to be incorporated into Faliscan funerary sites around this time, becoming grave sites themselves by the end of the century. Loculus tombs can be divided into two distinct categories depending upon the number of loculi: the Narce type, containing one loculus, and the Montarano type, containing two. Another loculus tomb discovered in the Celle necropolis uniquely does not contain two loculi placed on opposite walls, but instead on adjacent walls in an L-shaped formation. In the first quarter of the 7th-century BCE, the Faliscans began to use rock-cut chamber tombs. In the northern and southern regions of Faliscan territory, it is common for the chamber tombs to be carved around a pilaster. Faliscan chamber tombs often contain multiple loculi closed with tiles, a layout unlike other contemporary cultures.

In Narce, a 2.8 by 1.55 meter Faliscan sarcophagus was uncovered buried within a 1.45-meter-deep hole in 2012. The sarcophagus was contained inside a recess at the bottom of a trench filled with sand. At the long ends of the sarcophagus, a layer of compacted tufa fragments held the coffin in place. It was enclosed with a layer of irregularly placed rocks, which are then placed beneath separate layers of coal mixed with clay underneath a layer of sand and pozzolana. The final layer, covering all previous strata, consists of large tufa blocks mixed with clay. On the bottom of the sarcophagus, a drainage channel roughly shaped like the letter "Y" ending in a circular hole likely functioned to remove slurry and natural tissues liquified as part of the process of decomposition. This drainage system potentially motivated the unique sloped position of the sarcophagus; the placement on a slope allowed the fluids the flow out of the tomb. Collectively, these practices served to protect the tomb from damage and to preserve the body; in particular, the drainage of fluids helped to delay the rotting of the corpse and possibly to ritualistically purify the body. The grave goods were likely stolen prior to excavation, although remnants of a cup and a bronze fusiform pendant were uncovered.

==== Burial goods ====
Faliscan funerary goods varied depending upon the social status of the deceased; the graves of elites had more ostentatious collections of objects while the graves of lower-class persons stored few offerings. One of the most common burial items in Faliscan society was a type of Etruscan vase called a holmos; the number of holmoi in a grave is often equivalent to the number of burials. In many circumstances, the grave goods of Faliscan burials were heavily influenced by the material culture of nearby pre-Roman societies. For instance, a bronze bowl with a cuneiform inscription was found in a grave in Falerii. Trade routes connecting various civilizations from across the Mediterranean likely brought material goods from various distinct cultures to the ager Faliscus. It is likely that these trade routes, in particular commercial routes with the Etruscans, are responsible for the numerous foreign objects found in Faliscan burials. During the 5th and 6th centuries BCE, the Faliscans traded with the Attic parts of Greece, resulting in large quantities of black and red-figure pottery appearing in Faliscan sites.

Adult Faliscans were buried with grave goods reflecting their role within society; men were often buried with spears and swords on the left side of their corpse while women were often buried with tools for spinning or weaving such as spindle whorls, wooden spindles, a weaving comb pendant, and distaffs. Bronze distaffs occupy the same position in the tombs of women as weaponry occupies in the graves of men. These distaffs were often ornately decorated with inlay of amber and gold. They likely did not serve a utilitarian function for spinning like regular distaffs; instead, they probably served a ceremonial purpose. Linen is mentioned as a characteristic feature of the Faliscan people by the 1st-century CE Roman writer Silius Italicus. Although weapons such as swords and spears are most often found in male graves, ritual axes have been uncovered in female graves. In one burial, a 30–40-year-old woman was buried with a miniature axe covering her forehead. This grave good likely reflected the significance of women or priestesses for religious sacrifice; it possibly reflects a more specific connection between women and the division of the meat of sacrificed animals.

The graves of female adolescents or children uniquely contain smaller, scaled down burial goods that lack any reference to work-related activities and are sometimes connected to childhood play; they also usually, although not always, lack any reference to the funerary symposium. It was common for the clothing of young girls to be covered in metal plates sometimes adorned with swastikas. Within a Faliscan tomb on the slopes of Monte Greco are the bodies of a mother and daughter, both buried in a trench tomb. Both women wore jewelry, although mother has larger amounts of jewelry and the highest-quality jewelry. The mother was buried with amber pendants that possibly functioned to protect fertility, one of which depicts a woman with their bare hands grasping their belly and the other portrays a monkey. Another, likely fertility-related, pendant from a tomb in Pizzo Piede depicts a woman placing both her hands on her hips, drawing attention to the pubis. This same tomb contains a two-wheeled chariot as a grave good, possibly symbolic of the wedding and funeral rituals as well as the journey into the afterlife.

Archaeological analysis of a cremated Faliscan woman from Narce, who either had recently given birth or was in the late stages of pregnancy, revealed that a necklace of glass paste and amber beads was placed inside the olla following the cremation. Beads placed next to objects relating to the mother are similarly found in other structures identified as the graves of infants or female children. Amber is common throughout upper-class Faliscan graves in Narce, likely reflecting a high demand for exotic products. However, amber decorations and full-sized fibulae are primarily found in the graves of women over 30. The material was used to make complex necklaces, embellish tools or the parts of clothing, and—primarily in Narce—to make figurines. Amber figurines are almost exclusively found in female graves, although male graves sometimes contain several amber beads or some amber in fibulae.

Burial goods provide evidence for Faliscan fashion styles and cosmetics. Some female—likely high-class—burials contain sculptures of women's heads, possibly wedding gifts, which depict Faliscan hairstyles; they suggest that Faliscan women may have used a snood to cover their hair. Further evidence for this piece of headgear derives from a mid-4th-century BCE tomb in Coste di Manone, occupied by a female skeleton with the remains of hair and fabric, possibly once a component of a snood embroidered with a purple or blue thread. Women are also found buried with cosmetic goods such as—from the 6th-century BCE onwards—bronze mirrors. One glazed black cup from the 3rd-century BCE, contains evidence of a red powder possibly used as lipstick or a rouge. Ancient Faliscan women may have used cylindrical cases to store cosmetic products. Evidence for this is found in a Faliscan krater made in the mid-4th-century BCE, although the usage of these objects for this purpose was likely not as common as in other regions such as Latium. The Faliscans had a tradition of decorating the cinerary urns of women with clothing and garments. Funerary ollae belonging to women from the Tufi necropolis were richly ornamented with clothing designs, one urn was wrapped in a belt that likely symbolically represented the body of the deceased. In Narce, the necks of cinerary urns were covered in fibulae and pendants.

=== Religion ===
Several Faliscan deities are attested in Faliscan writings. The "Ceres inscription," a Faliscan text dated to the 7th or 6th centuries BCE mentioning the name of the goddess Ceres, reads "ceres ⁝ farme[ ]tom ⁝ louf[ ]rui[ ]m: [ ]kad." The name "ceres" is closely connected to the word "far," meaning grain; Ceres, an agricultural goddess, is closely connected to grain in Roman religion. It is also possible that the inscription mentions the name loụfir, potentially referring to the god Liber—a Roman viticulture deity—in connection to the Faliscan word uinom, meaning wine. However, this interpretation of the text is rejected as "epigraphically impossible" by the Faliscan scholar Gabriël Bakkum.

According to the 1st-century BCE Roman writer Ovid, Faliscan culture heavily emphasized the worship of the goddess Juno: Ovid refers to the Faliscans as "Iunonicolae" in his poem Fasti. Ovid described a Faliscan temple of Juno he visited, stating that it resembled Hellenistic structures and was located in a clearing, surrounded by dark woods and reached via a steep road. Another sanctuary at Falerii likely dedicated to Juno contains votive offerings such as axes, spear heads, and a bronze statuette depicting a warrior. Dionysius believed that the Faliscan civilization originated from Argos, citing the supposed similarities between the temple of Juno in Falerii and the temple of Hera at Argos. Dionysius and Ovid both state that the cult of Juno at Falerii continued into their lifetime. Archaeological evidence corroborates this narrative; ancient Roman inscriptions suggest that the cult of Juno Curritis was active during the reign of Emperor Trajan (r. 98–117). However, the religious practices of the cult under Roman occupation may not accurately reflect the traditional Faliscan practices.

Latin inscription in the Faliscan alphabet mentioning the name Menerua, meaning Minerva.

Various Roman authors mention another popular Faliscan cult called the Hirpi Sorani who were said to have conducted ceremonies at Monte Soratte. This ritual is entirely unmentioned in the epigraphical record, save for one inscription possibly containing the word sorex ("priest") that is potentially connected to this practice. Roman authors largely connect the Hirpi Sorani to the god Apollo, an account that is supported by Faliscan inscriptions mentioning cult sites of Apollo. The Faliscans may have worshipped a deity unique to their culture called Titus Mercus, a god possibly related to Oscan Mercus or the Roman Mercury.

Jupiter is possibly attested in a broken Middle Faliscan inscription reading "[...]s pater." The inscription can be restored as something resembling "dies pater," an archaic name for Jupiter. Further evidence for Jupiter worship in Faliscan culture comes a statue possibly depicting Jupiter found in a temple in Civita Castellana. Minerva is attested for in the same Middle Faliscan text, which contains the word "menerua." Ovid proposes that the goddess Minerva earned the epithet Capta due to an evocatio from the Faliscans. Italian archaeologist Mario Torelli argued that the Roman cult of Minerva Capta predated the conquest of the Faliscans and that the evocatio merely referred to the capture of the Faliscan statue of Minerva. Similarly, the Roman writers Macrobius and Servius both claim that the cult of Janus Quadrifons was brought to Rome after the conquest of the ager Faliscus.

Faliscan legends and tales are almost exclusively attested on through artwork depicting mythological scenes, often events from Etruscan mythology. However, one Middle Faliscan inscription mentions the name canumede, implying that the Faliscans shared the story of Ganymede with other cultures. Ganymede is possibly depicted in a headless statue of a naked young boy holding an oenochoe found in a Faliscan temple. If this statue does portray Ganymede, then it possibly indicates that the deity was involved in ceremonial rites of passage for young men in the city. Few Faliscan religious positions are described in the sources; one inscription mentions a haruspex, another mentions a rex possibly connected to the Rex sacrorum, and Servius claims the fetiales priesthood originated from the Faliscans. Two Faliscan festivals, the Struppearia and decimatrus are described by the 2nd-century Roman grammarian Festus. According to Dionysius, holy women had an important religious function at the temple of Juno in Falerii; he writes that an unmarried girl, called the "canephorus" or the "basket-bearer," performed the initial sacrificial rites and that an ensemble of virgins sung songs in praise of the goddess.

=== Language ===
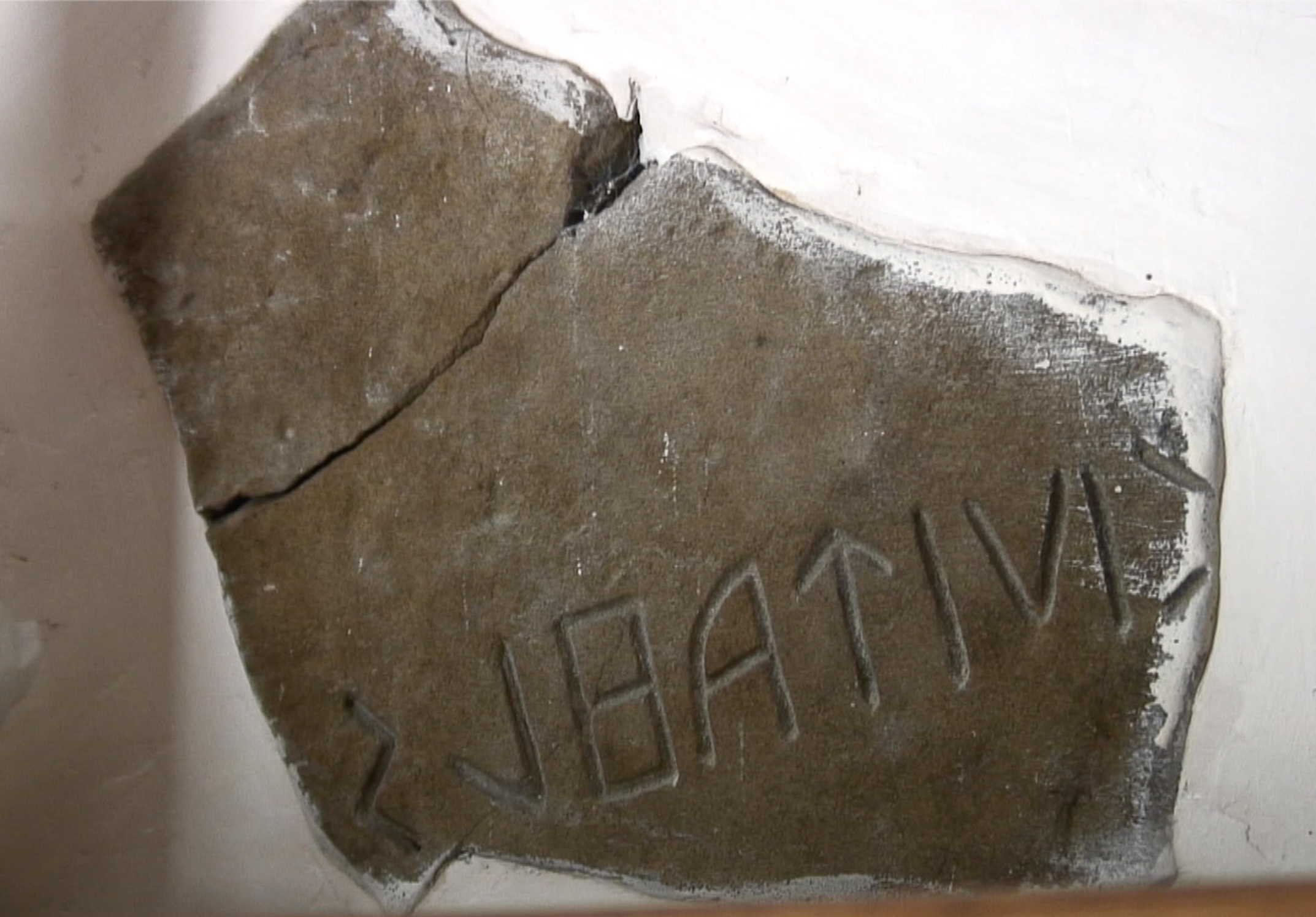
Sandstone inscription Faliscan language rock necropolis of Foglia, Tiber Valley

The Faliscan language, attested by the 7th century BC is an Indo-European language. Together with Latin, it forms the Latino-Faliscan languages group of the Italic languages. It seems probable that the language persisted, being gradually permeated with Latin, until at least 150 BC.

== See also ==
- Etruria
- Tiber Valley

== Sources ==
- Bakkum, Gabriël CLM (2009). The Latin Dialect of the Ager Faliscus: 150 Years of Scholarship. Thesis, University of Amsterdam. Vol. Part I. Amsterdam: Amsterdam University Press.
- Biella, Maria (February 22, 2024), "The Faliscans and the Capenates", in Mauiro, Marco (ed.), The Oxford Handbook of Pre-Roman Italy (1000--49 BCE), Oxford University Press, pp. 330–341, doi:10.1093/oxfordhb/9780199987894.013.56, ISBN 978-0-19-998789-4
- Brolli, Maria; Tabolli, Jacopo (2013). "A special sarcophagus for a Faliscan Wake". Etruscan News.
- Brolli, Maria; Tabolli, Jacopo (August 23, 2016), "The Ager Faliscus and its women", Women in Antiquity (1st ed.), London: Routledge, doi:10.4324/9781315621425-68, ISBN 978-131-562-142-5
- Harari, Maurizio (2010). The Imagery of the Etrusco-Faliscan Pantheon.
- Joseph, Lionel S.; Klein, Jared S. (1981). "A New Restoration in the Faliscan Ceres-Inscription with Notes on Latin Molere and Its Italic Cognates". Harvard Studies in Classical Philology. 85: 293–300. doi:10.2307/311178. ISSN 0073-0688. JSTOR 311178.
- Kraus, Christina Shuttleworth (2021-01-08), "Livy's Faliscan Schoolmaster", Usages of the Past in Roman Historiography, Brill, pp. 146–168, ISBN 978-90-04-44508-6
- Tabolli, Jacopo; Neri, Sara (2017-11-20), The Faliscans and the Capenates, De Gruyter, pp. 559–578, doi:10.1515/9781614513001-029, ISBN 978-1-61451-300-1
- Tabolli, Jacopo; Turfa, Jean MacIntosh (2014-05-31). "Discovered Anew: A Faliscan Tomb-Group from Falerii-Celle in Philadelphia". Etruscan Studies. 17 (1): 28–62. doi:10.1515/etst-2014-0009. ISSN 2163-8217.
- Pola, Angela (2018). "The Adonis Painter: A Faliscan Red-Figure Painter and His Group". Archeologia Classica. 69: 635–656. ISSN 0391-8165. JSTOR 26600545.
- Turfa, Jean (2013). The Etruscan World. Taylor & Francis. ISBN 978-113-405-523-4.
- Verreyke, Hélène (2002-01-01). "The Faliscan Red-Figured Stamnos of Ghent University". Bulletin Antieke Beschaving. 77: 43–48. doi:10.2143/BAB.77.0.94.
