= Falerii Veteres =

Falerii Veteres, now Civita Castellana, was one of the chief cities of the duodecim populi of ancient Etruria. The site is about 2 km west of the course of the Via Flaminia, some 50 km north of Rome.

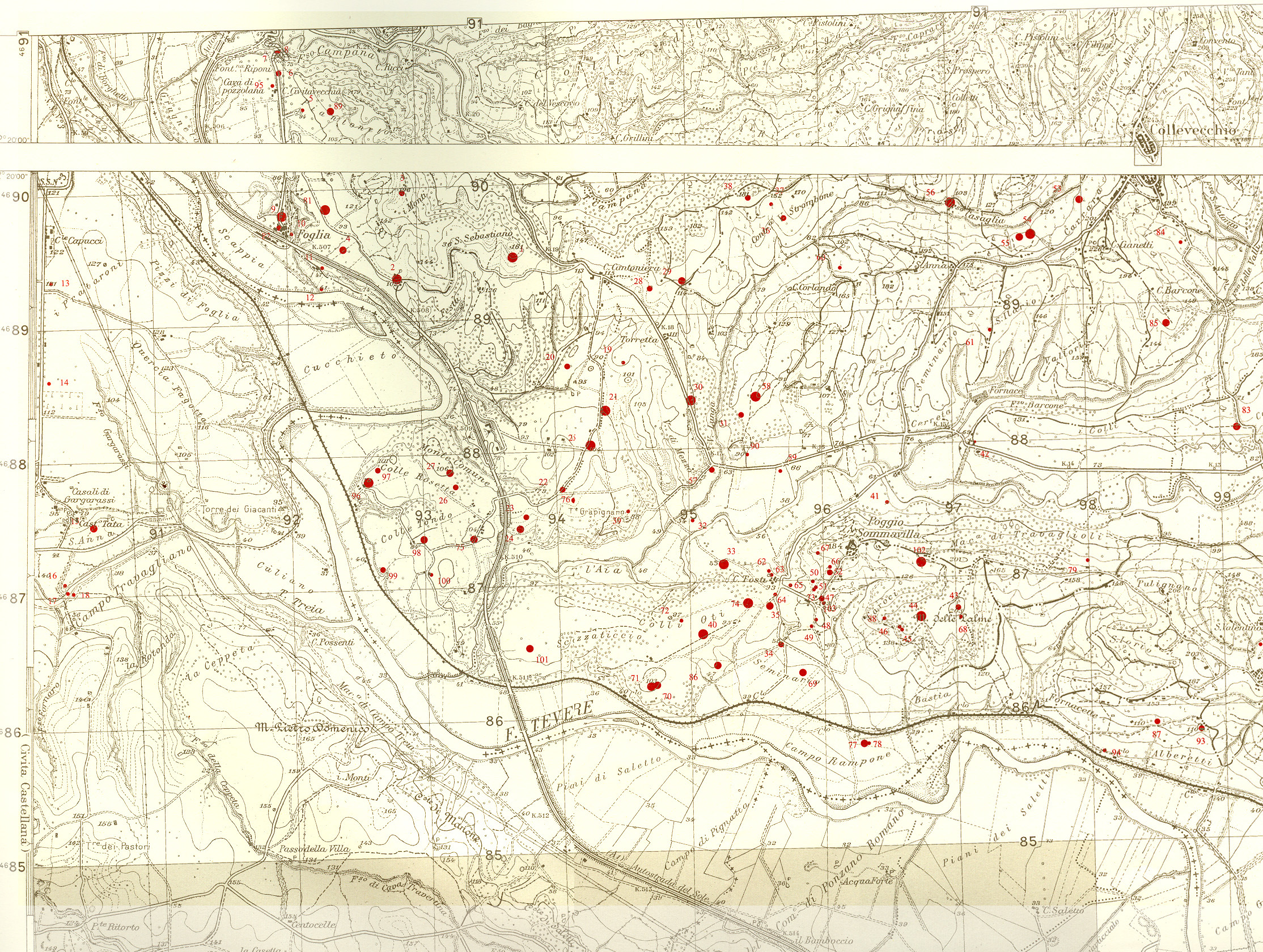
Archaeological map of Flalerii Veteres territory at Tiber Valley, Flaminia Verga

The legendary foundation of the site has been linked to colonists coming from Argos. The people of the area, the Faliscans, spoke a language that was distinct from that of the Etruscans.

Following a revolt by the Faliscan tribe in around 241 BC, the Romans resettled the population of Falerii Veteres at Falerii Novi, a less defensible location.

== Archaeology ==
A kylix with red figure decoration was found in a chamber tomb at Falerii Veteres with the Faliscan language inscription foied uino pafo cra carefo, Latin: hodie vinum bibam, cras carebo, lit. 'today I will drink wine; tomorrow I will not have any'. The kylix is kept in the National Etruscan Museum.

== See also ==
- Tiber Valley
- Falerii Novi
- Archaeological area of Poggio Sommavilla
- Foglia
