= Fescennia =

Ancient city in Lazio, Italy

Fescennia or Fescennium was an ancient Etruscan and Faliscan. It was probably located to the north of the modern Corchiano, 6 miles (9.7 km) north west of Civita Castellana, in central Italy.

== History ==
Fescennia or Fescennium was an ancient city that was of Etruscan and Faliscan origin. The term Fescennine Verses refers to a certain kind of drinking song popular at festivals in ancient Rome and elsewhere. According to Festus, these songs were introduced from Fescennia, but others have thought that there is no reason to assume that any particular town was especially devoted to the use of such songs.

Fescennia's warriors are also mentioned in Book VII of Virgil's Aeneid as following Messapus, the 'Steed Tamer' in the war waged by Turnus against Aeneas.

== Location ==
Fescennia or Fescennium was probably located immediately to the north of the modern Corchiano, 6 miles (9.7 km) north west of Civita Castellana, in central Italy. The Via Amerina traverses it.

At the Riserva S. Silvestro, walls exist. At Corchiano itself, however, similar walls may be traced, and the site is a strong and characteristic triangle between two deep ravines, with the third (west) side cut off by a ditch. Here, too, remains of two bridges may be seen, and several rich tombs have been excavated.
