= Falerii Novi =

Ancient Roman walled town

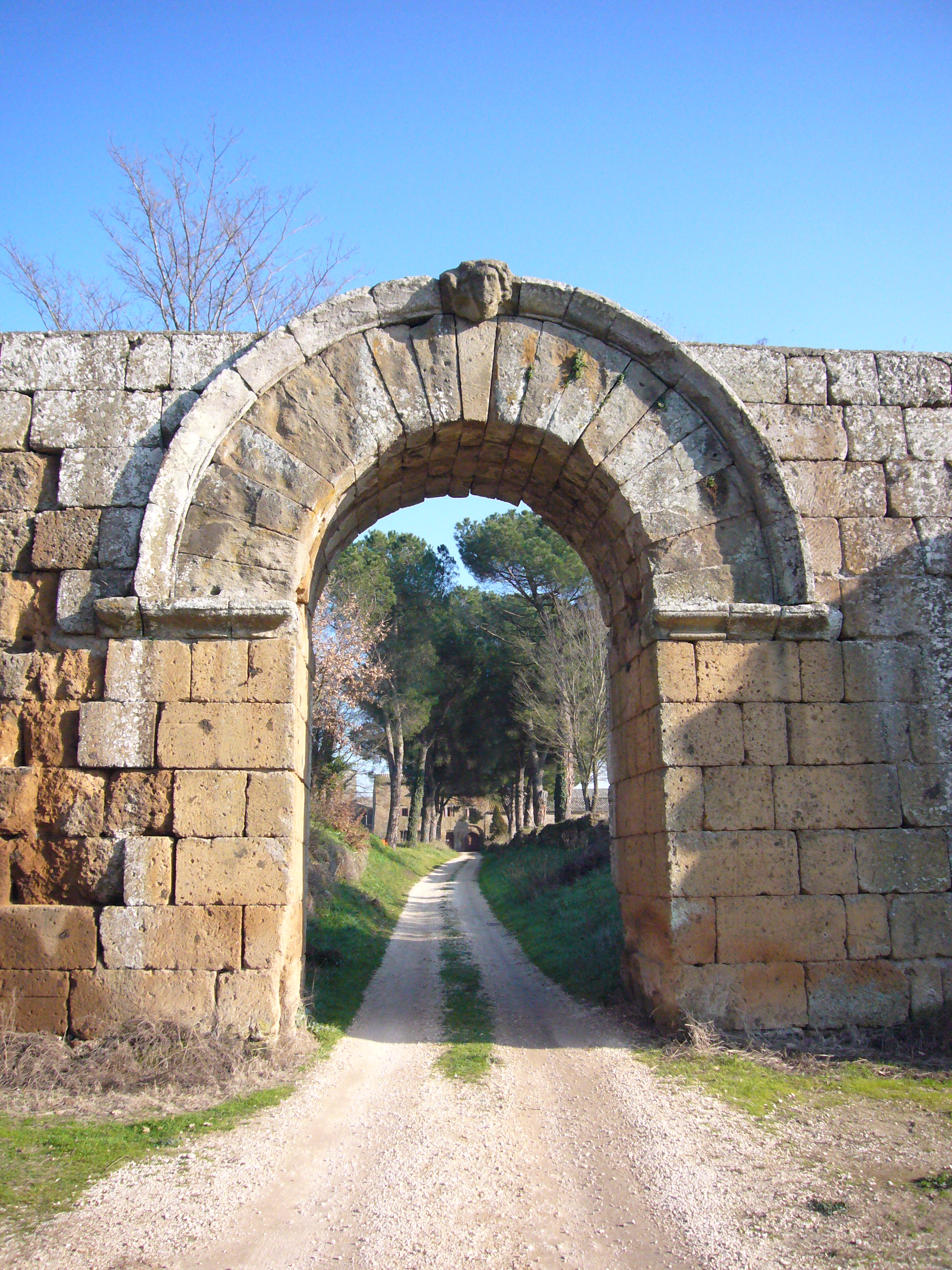
- Entrance gate

- Location within Italy
- 42°17′59″N 12°21′30″E
- Type: Settlement
- Cultures: Falisci; Romans
- Location: Falerii, Lazio, Italy

History
- Built: 241 BC
- Abandoned: c. 700s AD

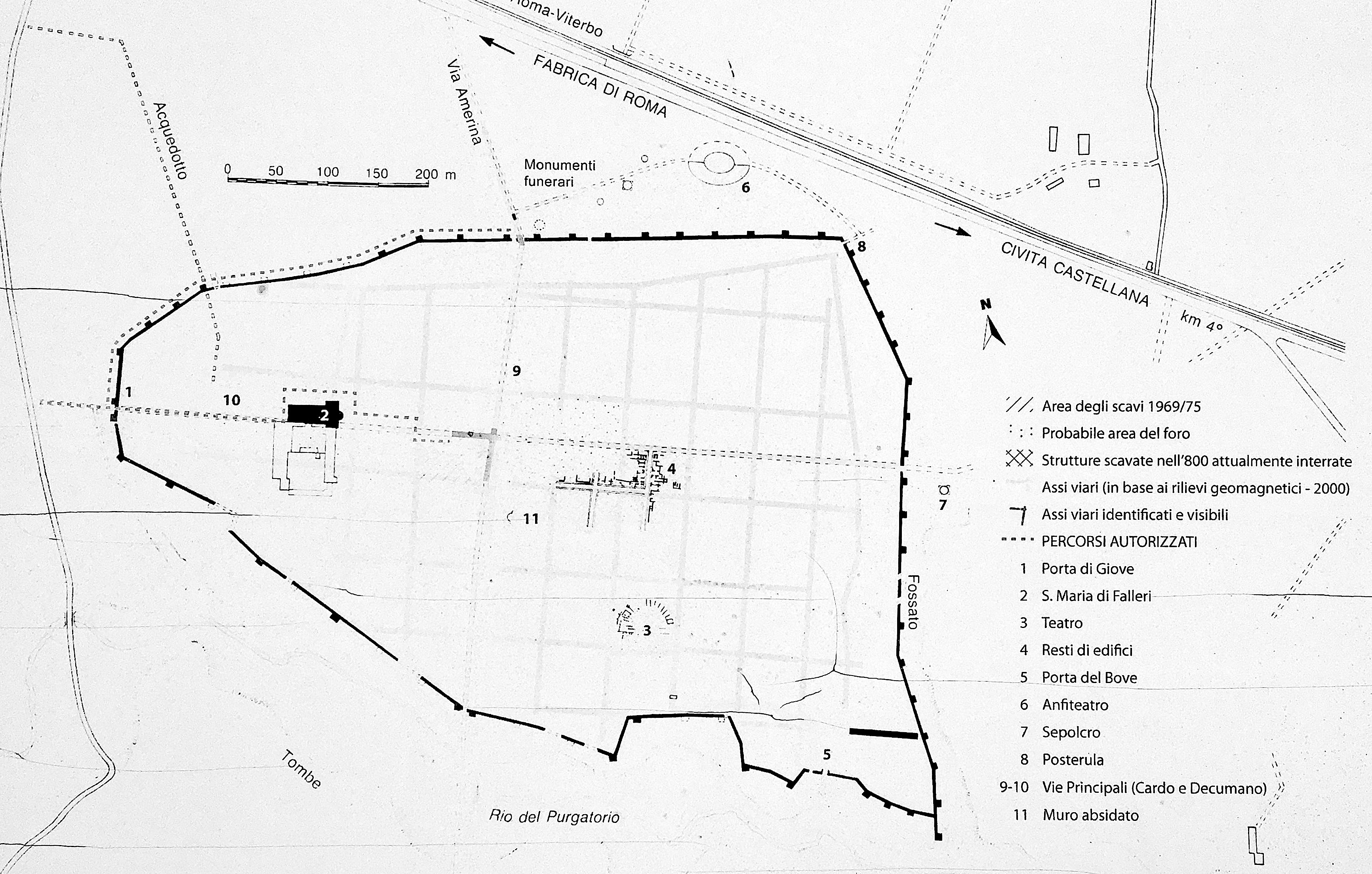
Map of Falerii Novi

Falerii Novi (English: New Falerii) was an ancient Roman walled town in the Tiber River valley, about 50 km (31 mi) north of Rome and 6 km (3.7 mi) west of Civita Castellana.

Its impressive gate and the whole perimeter of its city walls are still visible.

== History ==
According to Polybius and Livy, the Falisci people of Falerii Veteres revolted against the Roman Republic in 241 BC. Titus Manlius Torquatus was sent and during the first battle the Falerii defeated the Romans, but their cavalry was defeated. In the second battle the Romans defeated the Falerii.

The war lasted six days, with the siege of Falerii Veteres taking three days. The slaves of the Falisci and half of their territory were seized, and Falerii Veteres was destroyed.

The Falisci were resettled in Falerii Novi, a new town in a less defensible position on the left bank of Rio Purgatorio on a low volcanic plateau 5 km west of Falerii Veteres, and in the ager Faliscus. The walls of the city made from tuff blocks had 50 towers and nine gates. The city was built north of Via Flaminia.

It became a colony (Junonia Faliscorum) perhaps under Augustus, though according to the inscriptions, apparently not until the time of Gallienus (who may have been born there). There were bishops of Falerii up until 1033, when the desertion of the place in favour of the present site began. The last mention of it dates from 1064.

== Archaeology ==
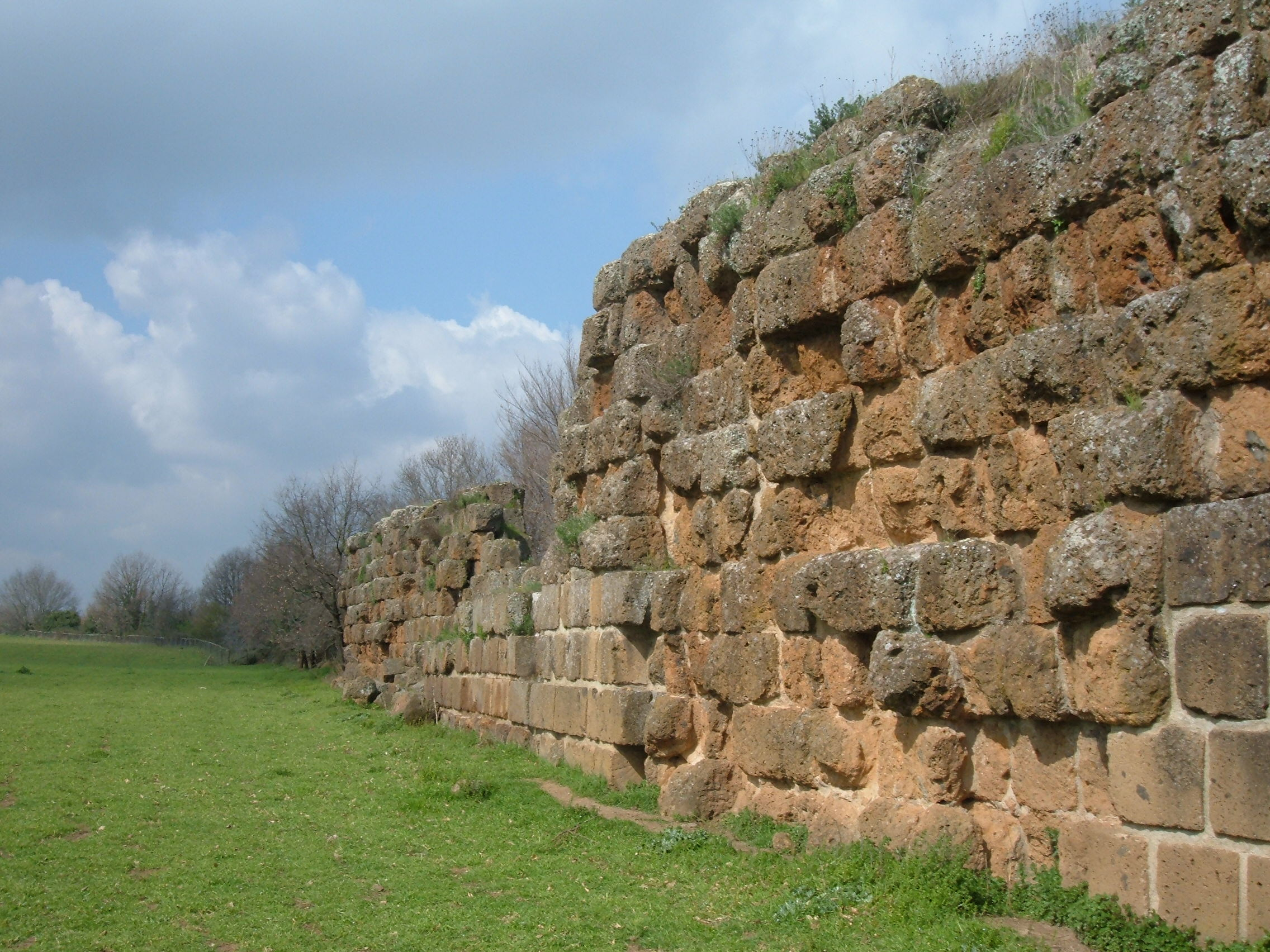
Remains of the city wall

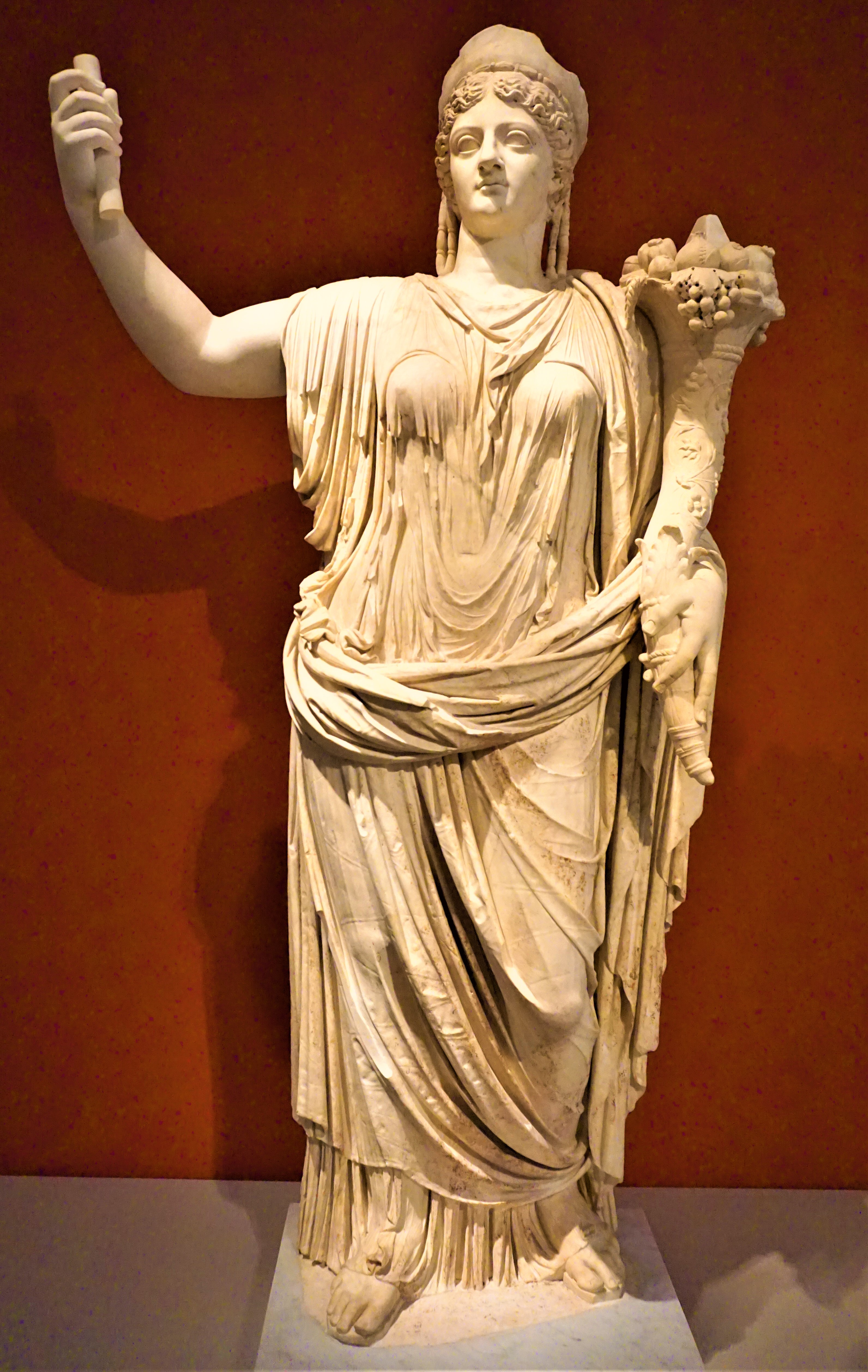
Deified Empress Livia from Falerii (Altes Museum Berlin

In 1829, the theatre was excavated and statues from the reign of Augustus depicting members of his family, with his wife Livia, and grandsons Gaius Caesar and Lucius Caesar were removed. In 1903, the city plan of Falerii Novi was mapped.

The British School at Rome conducted new fieldwork at the site, including surface survey, as part of the Tiber Valley Project. This work was undertaken in 1997-1998. The results were published by Simon Keay and colleagues in 2000, including a new plan of the urban site.

In 2020, a ground-penetrating radar survey conducted by Cambridge and Ghent universities showed a network of water pipes that notably run beneath the insulae and not, as is more usual, along the streets. An open-air swimming pool within a large public baths was connected to a series of water pipes which lead to the aqueduct.

The survey also mapped a market, temple, bath complex and a public monument which are architecturally elaborate for a small city. Near the north gate A unique pair of large buildings facing each other separated by a covered passageway with central row of columns was discovered.

From 2021, a new major excavation project began across the site, which has so far revealed a market building, house, shops, and streetside infrastructure dating from the mid-Republic.

== Monuments ==
The site contains the remnants of a Roman temple, notable because it predates the settlement and because it is large, measuring roughly 120 x 60 m. The foundations of this temple were discovered by ground penetrating radar.

An 11th Century Benedictine Abbey Church incorporating stone taken from the Roman structures is located near the west gate.
