= Fescennine Verses =

Fescennine Verses (Fescennina carmina), one of the earliest kinds of Italian poetry, subsequently developed into satire and Roman comic drama.

== History ==
Originally sung at village harvest-home rejoicing, they made their way into the towns, and became the fashion at religious festivals and private gatherings, especially weddings, to which in later times they were practically restricted. They were usually in the Saturnine metre and took the form of a dialogue consisting of an interchange of extemporaneous raillery. Those who took part in them wore masks made of the bark of trees. At first harmless and good-humored, if somewhat coarse, these songs gradually outstripped the bounds of decency; malicious attacks were made upon both gods and men, and the matter became so serious that the law intervened and scurrilous personalities were forbidden by the Twelve Tables (Cicero, De re publica, 4.10; see also Horace epist. 2.1.139).

== Examples ==
Specimens of the Fescennines used at weddings are the Epithalamium of Manlius (Catullus 61) and the four poems of Claudian in honor of the marriage of Honorius and Maria; the first, however, is distinguished by a licentiousness which is absent in the latter. Ausonius in his Cento nuptialis mentions the Fescennines of Annianus Faliscus, who lived in the time of Hadrian.

== Etymology ==
Various derivations have been proposed for the word "Fescennine." According to Festus, they were introduced from Fescennia in Etruria, but there is no reason to assume that any particular town was specially devoted to the use of such songs. As an alternative Festus suggests a connection with fascinus, the Latin word referring to a phallus-shaped amulet used to ward off the evil eye, either because the Fescennina were regarded as a protection against evil influences (see Munro, Criticisms and Elucidations of Catullus, p. 76) or because the phallus, as the symbol of fertility, would from early times have been naturally associated with harvest festivals. H. Nettleship, in an article on The Earliest Italian Literature (Journal of Philology, xi. 1882), in support of Munro's view, translates the expression "verses used by charmers", assuming a noun fescennus, connected with fas fari.

== See also ==
- Epithalamium
