= M'Chira =

Village in Algeria, Algiers

Coordinates: 36°01′N 6°14′E

M'chira is a small village in Algeria, north east of Algiers.

The village has a school. It is 65 km South-West of Constantine, Algeria. It is the location of many ancient monuments, mostly from the Roman Era, such as Roman Drills known locally under the name of (Bir Tashma:ar).

== Location ==
M'Chira is at the junction of many roads, to Batna, Algeria in the south and Oum el Bouaghi to the East, to Setif on the West and Constantine to the north east.
