= Quiritis =

Pre-Roman goddess of motherhood also known as Juno

Quiritis was a Sabine (pre-Roman) goddess of motherhood. She was often associated with protection. In later years, Quiritis was identified with the goddess Juno, who was sometimes worshipped under the name Juno Quiritis (or Juno Curitis). Some scholars believe that Juno was in fact merely another version of Quiritis, although others say that the two are linked merely by borrowing.

Her name is believed to have derived from a Sabine word meaning "lance" or "spear", and she is often depicted holding that weapon (presumably in defence of someone or something). This is a feature that was incorporated into Juno's identity. Traditionally, Roman marriages included a ritual where the bride's hair was cut or parted with a spear - some see this as the result of Juno's association with marriage, although other explanations for the ritual are given as well.

Juno Quiritis is said to have been the only deity worshipped by all thirty of the original curiae (political and military divisions) established by Romulus. There was a temple to Juno Quiritis on the Campus Martius, an area where soldiers traditionally trained.
