= Archaeological Museum of Magliano Sabina =

Museum in Italy

Coordinates: 42°21′40″N 12°28′57″E

- Museo civico archeologico di Magliano Sabina
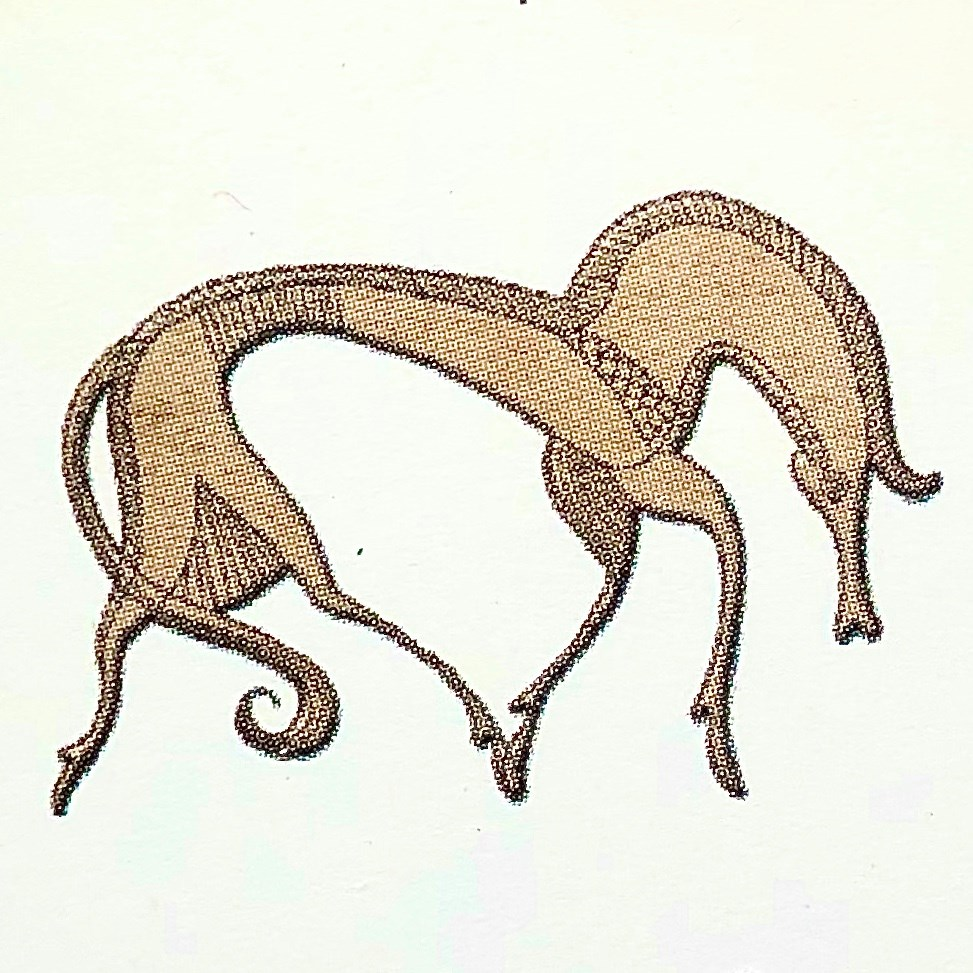

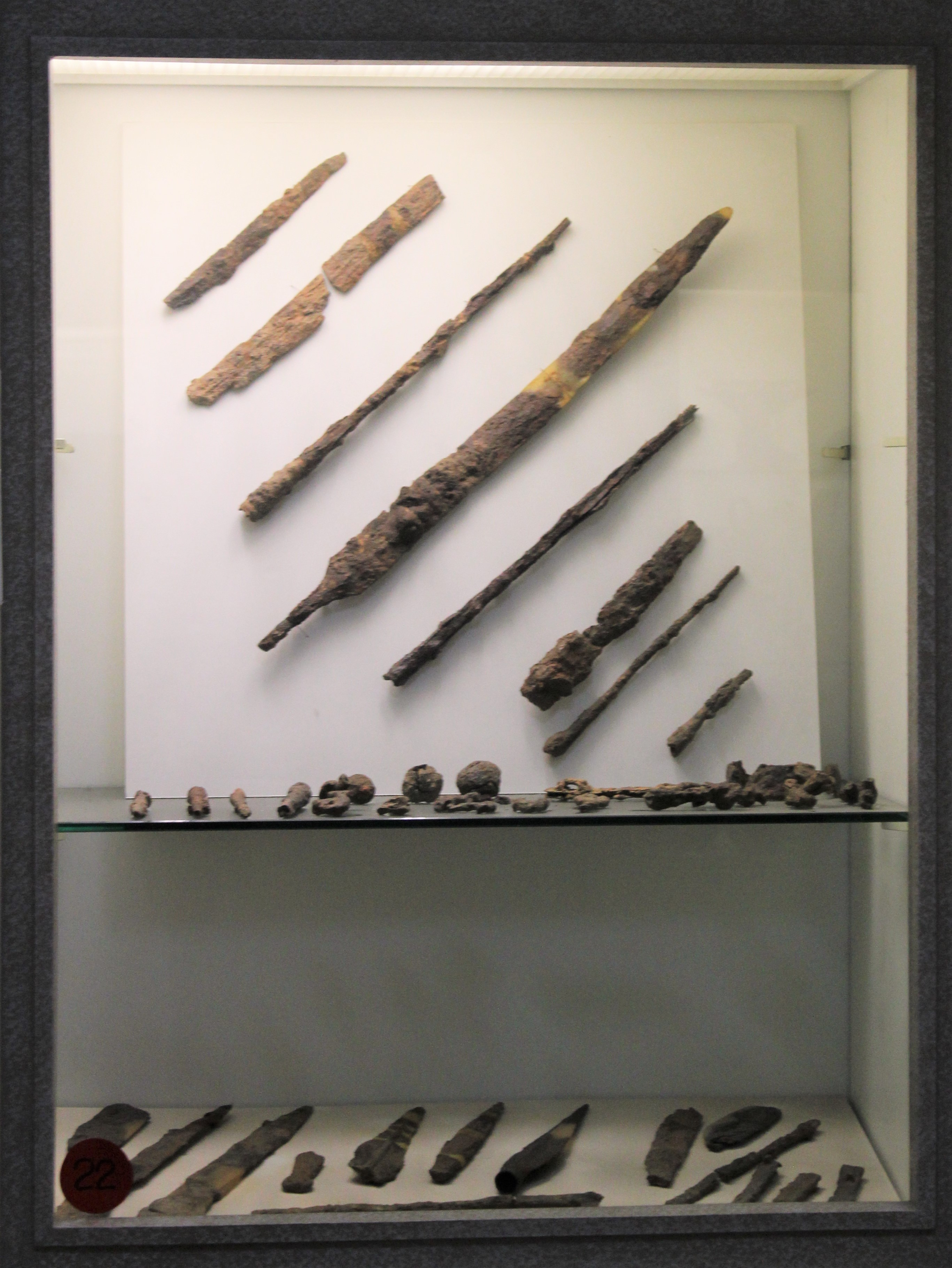
- Archaic-era display case with iron weapons from the Archaeological Museum of Magliano Sabina
- Established: 1989
- Location: Magliano Sabina
- Type: Archaeological museum
- Collections: Archaeological finds from prehistory to the Middle Ages
- Director: Paola Santoro
- Website: www.regione.lazio.it/musei/maglianosabina/index.php

The Archaeological Museum of Magliano Sabina is housed in Palazzo Gori. It is distributed over three floors, two of which can be visited by users, and one is reserved for the warehouse and restoration laboratory. The artifacts are displayed according to provenance and presented in chronological succession, which makes it possible to trace the fundamental lines of civilization in the Tiber Valley.

== History ==
The Civic Archaeological Museum of Magliano Sabina, previously housed on the top floor of the Municipal Palace, was established in the last decade of the last century, exactly in 1989, with regional funding from the Museums Office of the Lazio Region and the contribution of the Municipality and is currently housed at Palazzo Gori in the town’s historic center. Its establishment was possible thanks to a collection carried out over decades following all kinds of interventions carried out on the territory, both agricultural and service, by some local enthusiasts who gathered in a research group.

Through the constant study and review of a large number of fragments, there are 1683 items inventoried and cataloged in the I.C.C.D (Istituto Centrale per il Catalogo e la Documentazione) format and 800 exhibits from surface collections conducted within a geographical area that reaches from the River Nera to the River Farfa.

The museum’s collection consists of fragments that have been carefully reviewed and analyzed, alongside new topographical surveys of the region. This research has contributed to the scientific identification of the cultural origins and development of the Tiber Valley’s inhabitants, spanning from the Iron Age to Archaic periods. A notable outcome of this work was the identification and study of an Archaic settlement that once stretched across the hills where the town of Magliano now stands.

== Description ==
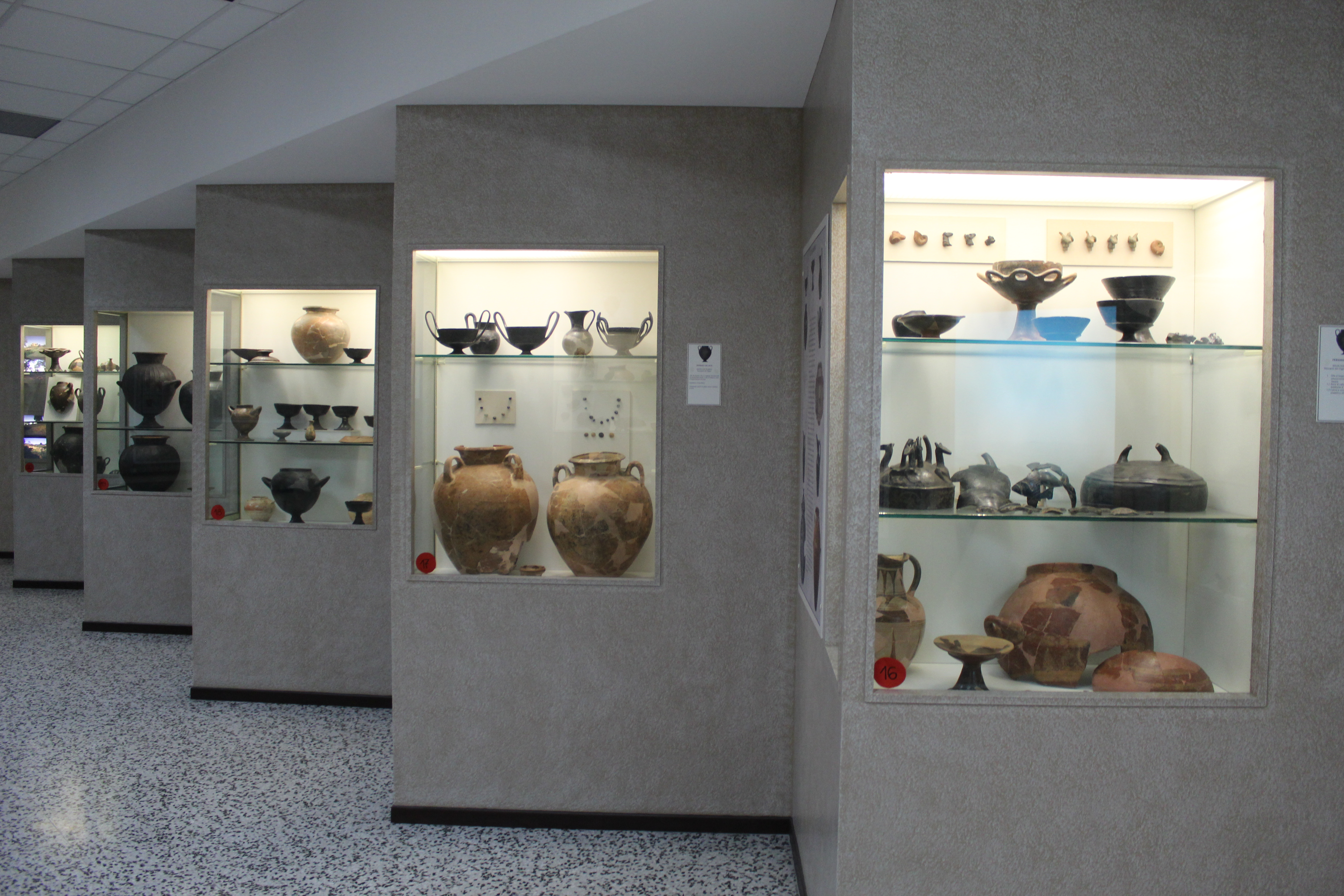
Archaeological Museum of Magliano Sabina, second floor, exhibit room 3, Sabine artifacts (artifacts, vases, and furnishings in brown impasto)

The museum's layout is on three floors divided into sections devoted to prehistory, the Bronze Age, the Iron Age, the Hellenistic, Archaic, and Roman periods up to medieval evidence. The first three floors can be visited by the public and house artifacts are displayed according to provenance and presented in chronological succession, which makes it possible to trace the fundamental lines of the Tiber Valley civilization.

In addition, the ground floor houses the reception offices that contain a small library for consultation available to users and a room dedicated to temporary exhibitions or educational workshops; the third and last floor, on the other hand, houses the warehouse with artifacts that are out of display or under restoration.

=== Ground floor ===
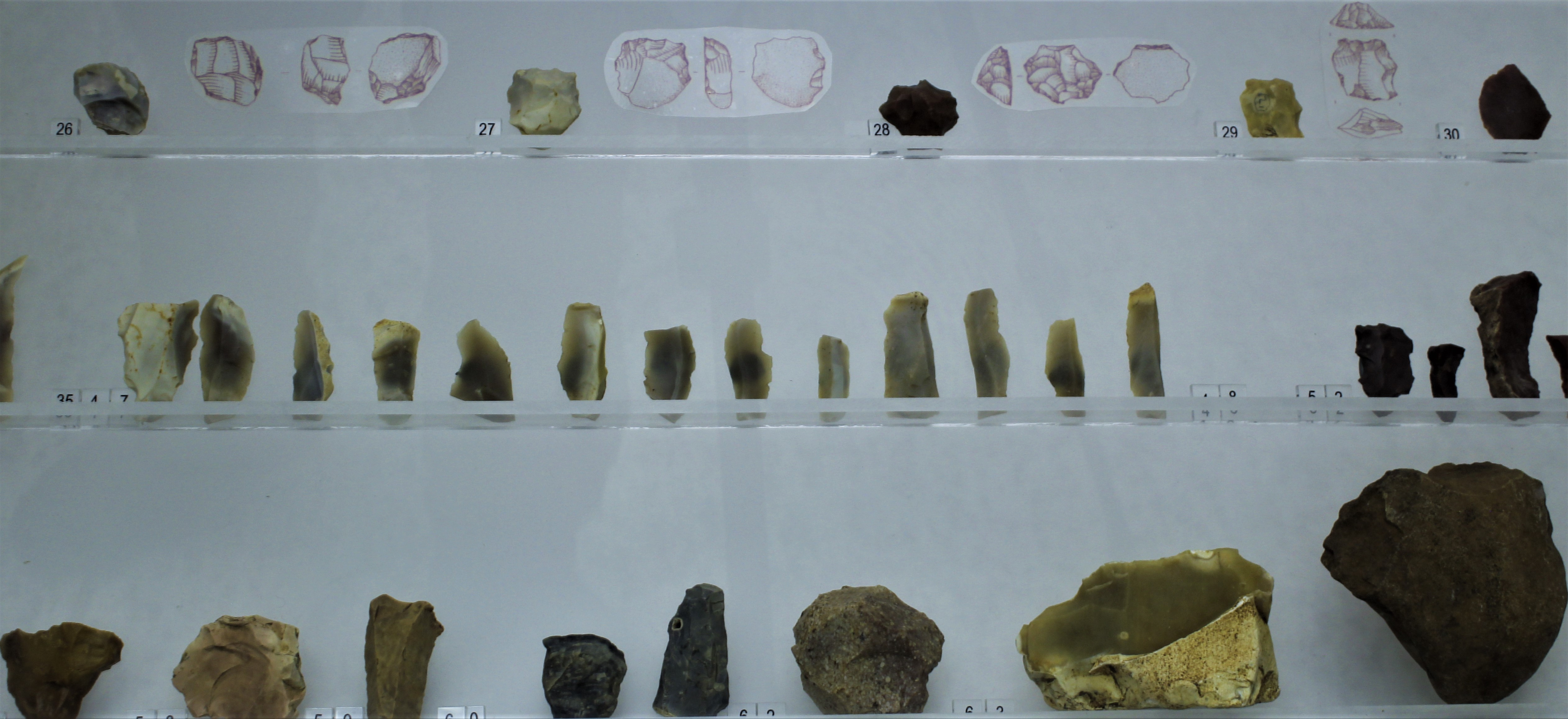
Flint scrapers, ground floor, Archaeological Museum of Magliano Sabina.

The sites from which the materials on display come, dating mainly to the Middle Paleolithic, were collected on a high terrace at the confluence of the L'Aia stream with the Tiber approximately fronting the estuary of the Treja, consisting of gravelly and sandy alluvial deposits known by the toponyms of Grappignano, Colli Oti (Area archeologica di Poggio Sommavilla), Macchia Grande, and Colle Rosetta. Materials can be divided into two distinct groups: one strongly modified by transport and external agents with encrustations that have altered its legibility; the second characterized by artifacts obtained with a predetermined chipping technique, i.e., capable of producing chips of controlled size (known as the Levallois technique, explained at the entrance with simulations of flint chipping).

=== First floor ===
Divided into 3 rooms, it collects archaeological documentation found in the area covering the time span from the Protohistoric Bronze Age to the invention of writing.

==== Room 1 ====
Tis room exhibits ceramic types represented by bowls, pitchers, ollae, and dolia. The material culture of these phases is represented by the exhibits of proto-Villanovan style found in Italy from the 12th to the 10th century B.C.E.:There are bowls with recessed rims, cups with flared rims, biconical vessels, ollae and dolia. The decorative repertoire consists of geometric motifs engraved in bands of grooves or imprinted with cords. Fragments of stoves used for cooking food are present.

==== Room 2 ====
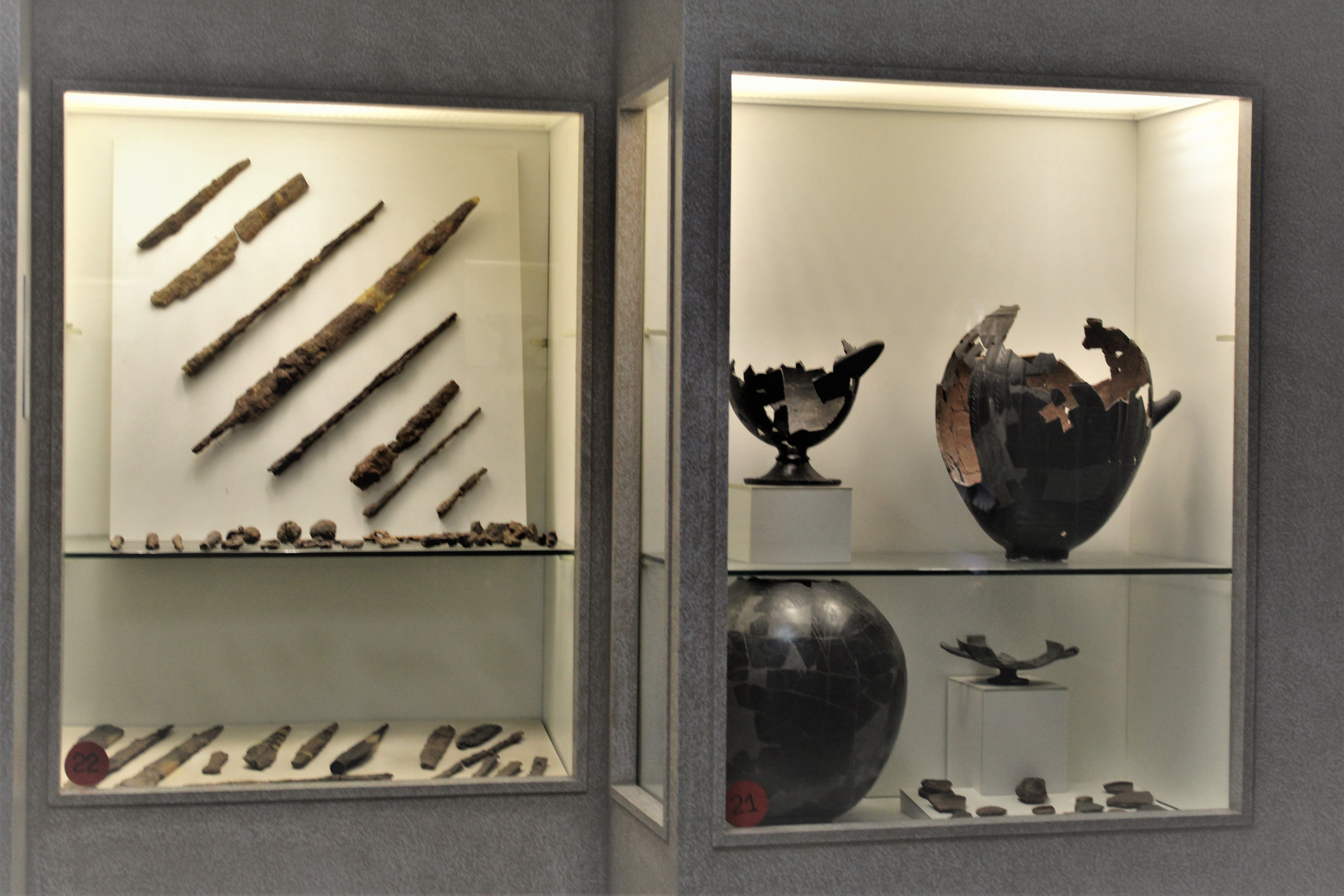
Various iron weapons (sword, spears, clubs) floor 1, room 3 of the Archaeological Museum of Magliano Sabina

The handmade wares on display are tableware pottery of finer workmanship (such as square cups, in some cases on pierced feet, cups with raised handles, amphorae, and amphorae with bifid or crested handles, jugs, and biconical vessels) and kitchenware (of coarser workmanship, mostly undecorated with a repertoire of forms represented by basins, large bowls, pans, ollae, dolia, and stoves) intended for cooking food and its preservation. These are handmade pottery with surfaces polished with sticks, decorated with ashlars, light grooves, ribs, and printed rims.

==== Room 3 ====
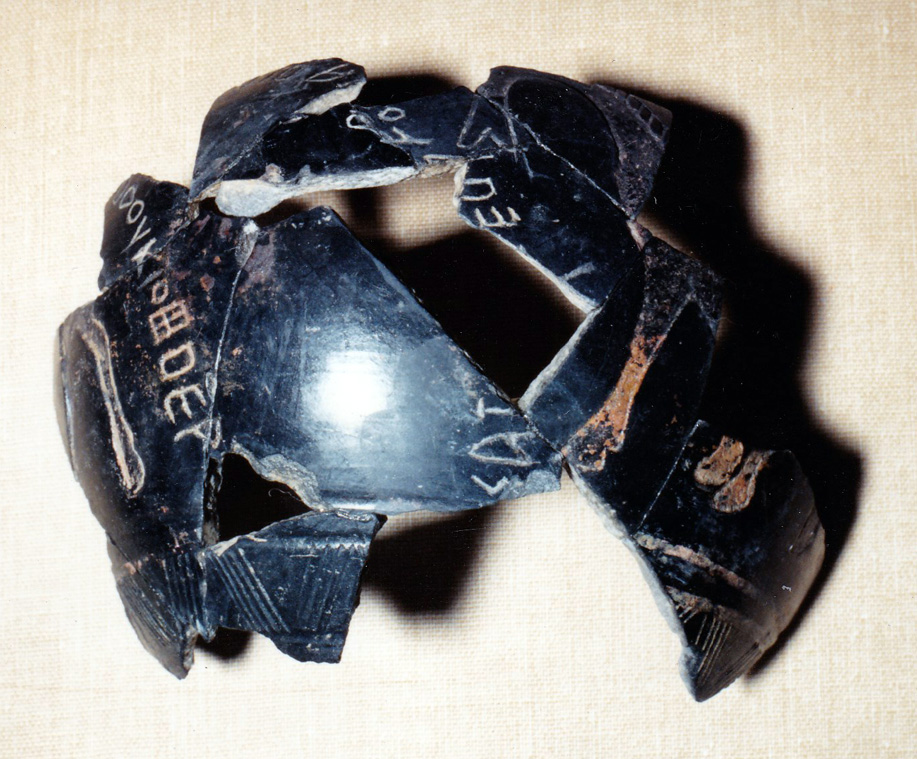
Small olla with archaic writing from the Necropolis of Giglio, floor 1, room 3 of the Archaeological Museum of Magliano

Writing marks the transition from protohistory to history. The small olla from the tomb of the Giglio necropolis in Magliano, as well as the miniature flask (Note: In the highly articulated picture of the writings attested in the second half of the 7th century BCE in southern Etruria and Latium, the Poggio Sommavilla inscription shows affinities with the Faliscan-Venetian-Capenate area, four-stroke sigma and ypsilon form) from Tomb III of the Poggio Sommavilla necropolis, document language and culture in the Tiber valley: a language that had adopted writing with an Euboic-Calcidian alphabet. Numerous cores of baked clay (hut plasters, second half of the seventh century B.C.) and grave goods include ollae in brown impasto, decorated with incision and excision, other large ollae in brown impasto, while the presence of bucchero vessels, in the types of chalices and kantharoi, testifies to trade with the Etruscan area.

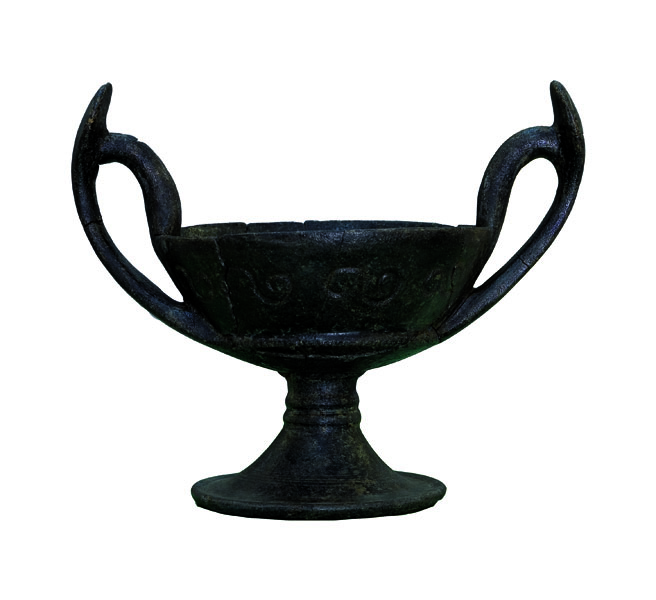
Kantharos, floor 1, room 3 of the Archaeological Museum of Magliano Sabina

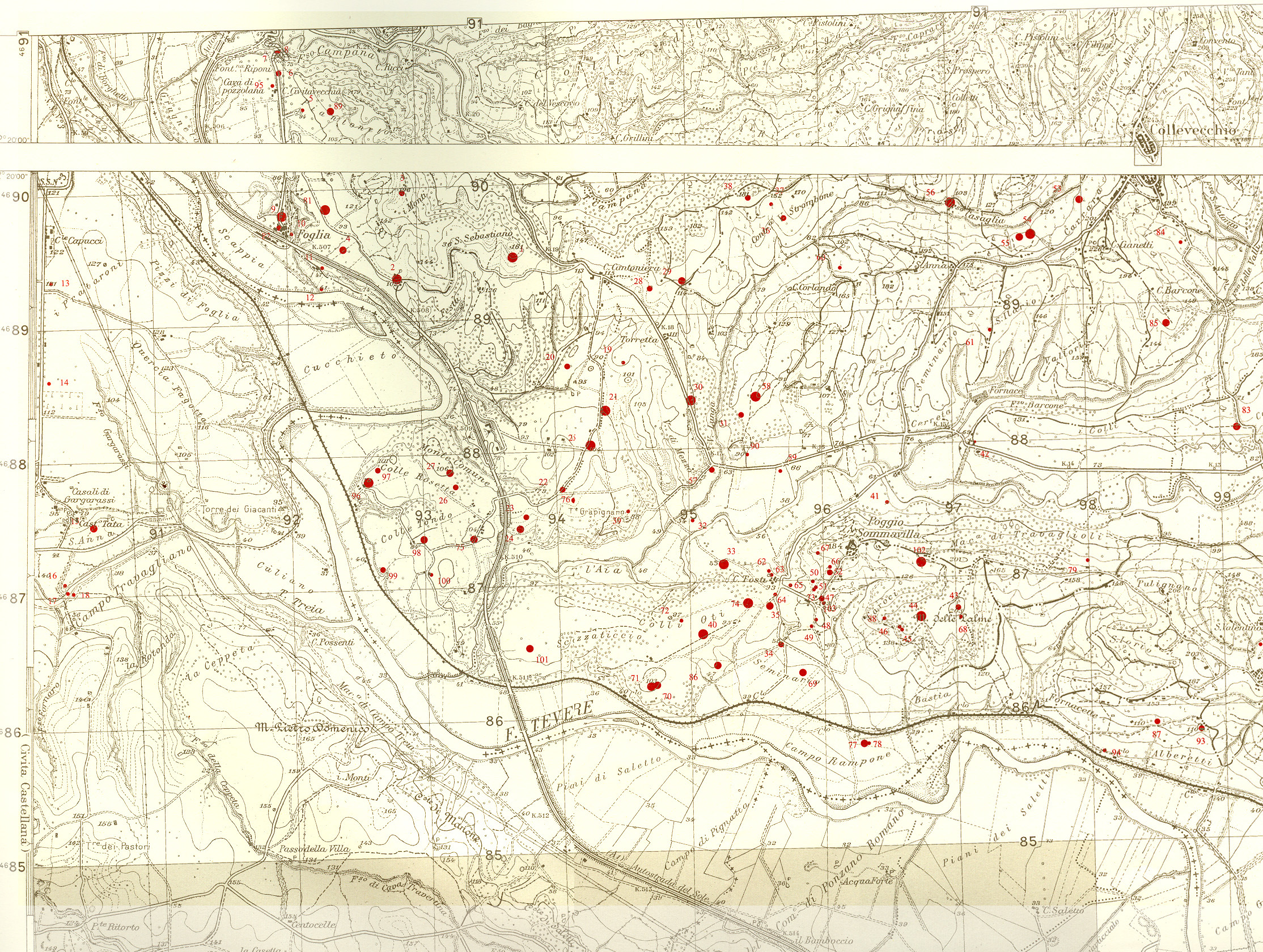
Archaeological map of the archaic center of Poggio Sommavilla-Foglia, Flaminia Verga

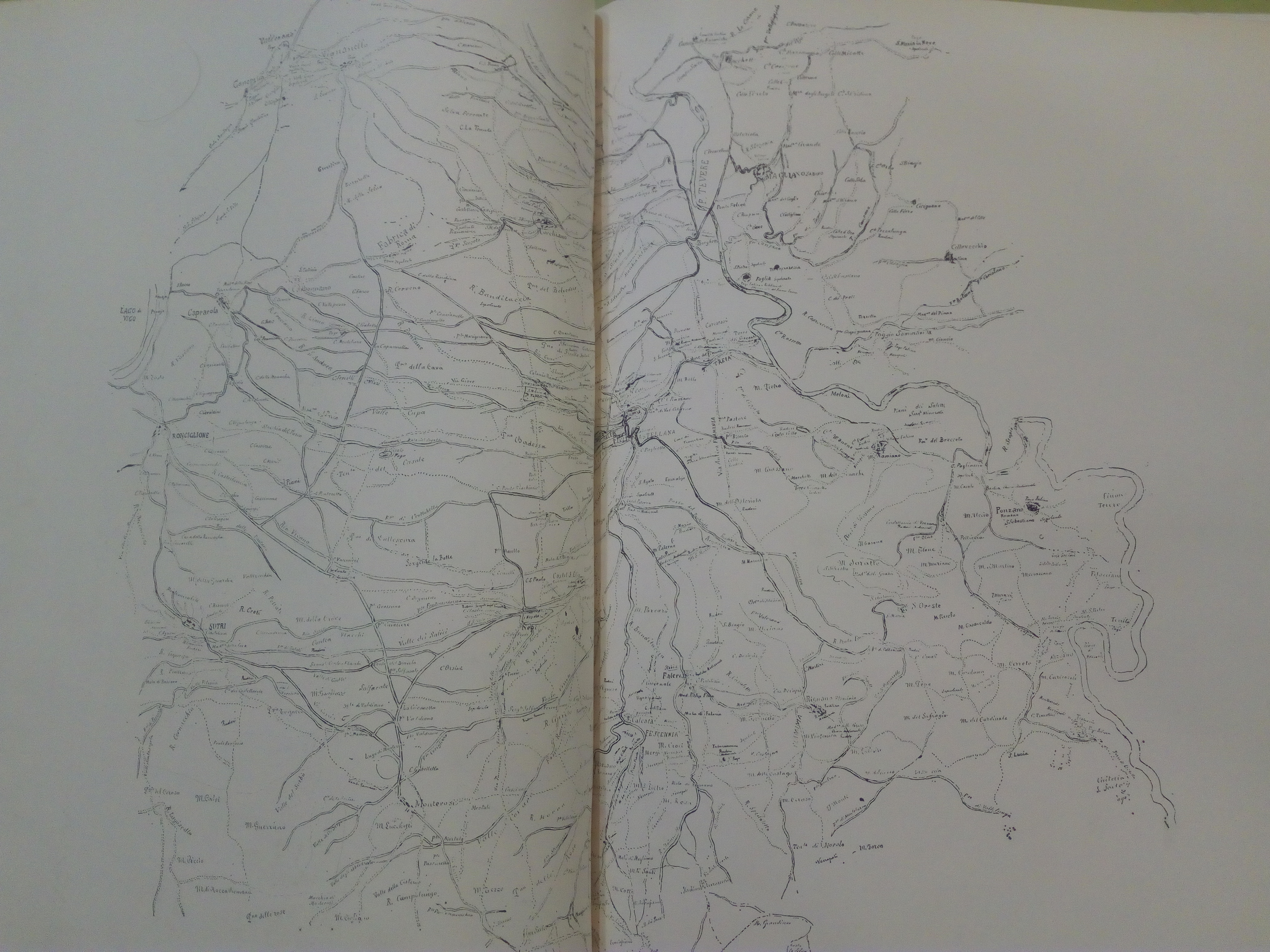
Archaeological map - Falerii and its region surveyed by the Sepolcri, Mancinelli Scotti Francesco

Within the built-up area of Foglia, after work on the Autostrada del Sole highway, above what remained of a rock necropolis carved into the tuffaceous wall on which the built area itself stands, close to a very ancient ford of the Tiber in communication with the Treja and Falerii Veteres, an inscription in the Faliscan alphabet of Foglia, a boustrophedon was found. It is found on a local sandstone slab. All letters are 3.5 cm in height, except for the 4 cm sigma and the 3 cm V sign.

=== Second floor ===
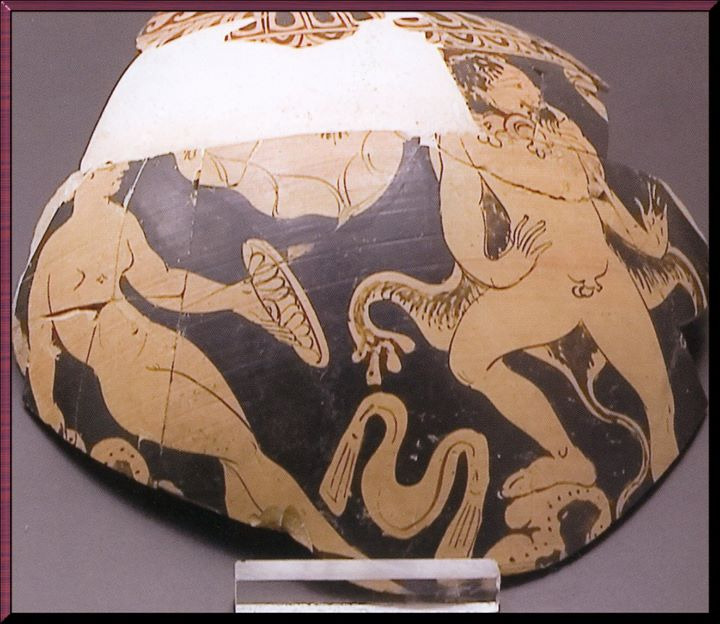
Red-figure stamnos representing Satyr with lion skin and woman with patera. Floor 2, room 1 of the Archaeological Museum of Magliano Sabina.

This plan exhibits findings concerning the settlement of Magliano Sabina in the late Classical period and the subsequent Romanization phase.

==== Room 1 ====
The origin of the material is the necropolis, and on display are grave goods composed mostly of red-figure vases of Faliscan production, black-painted vessels with subdued decoration, and accompanied by impasto pottery.

==== Room 2 ====
The materials, collected at the Monte le Palme site in the Poggio Sommavilla archaeological area, are on display. They are framed between the late 7th and the first half of the 6th century and are fragments of red, stick-polished impasto goblets and fragments of saucers with impressed decoration. Next are materials collected from the necropolis area, recovered as a result of agricultural work. The large brown impasto olla with plastic cord decoration and the Sabine amphora in gray impasto document the activity of local workshops during the first half of the 6th century BCE.

==== Room 3 ====
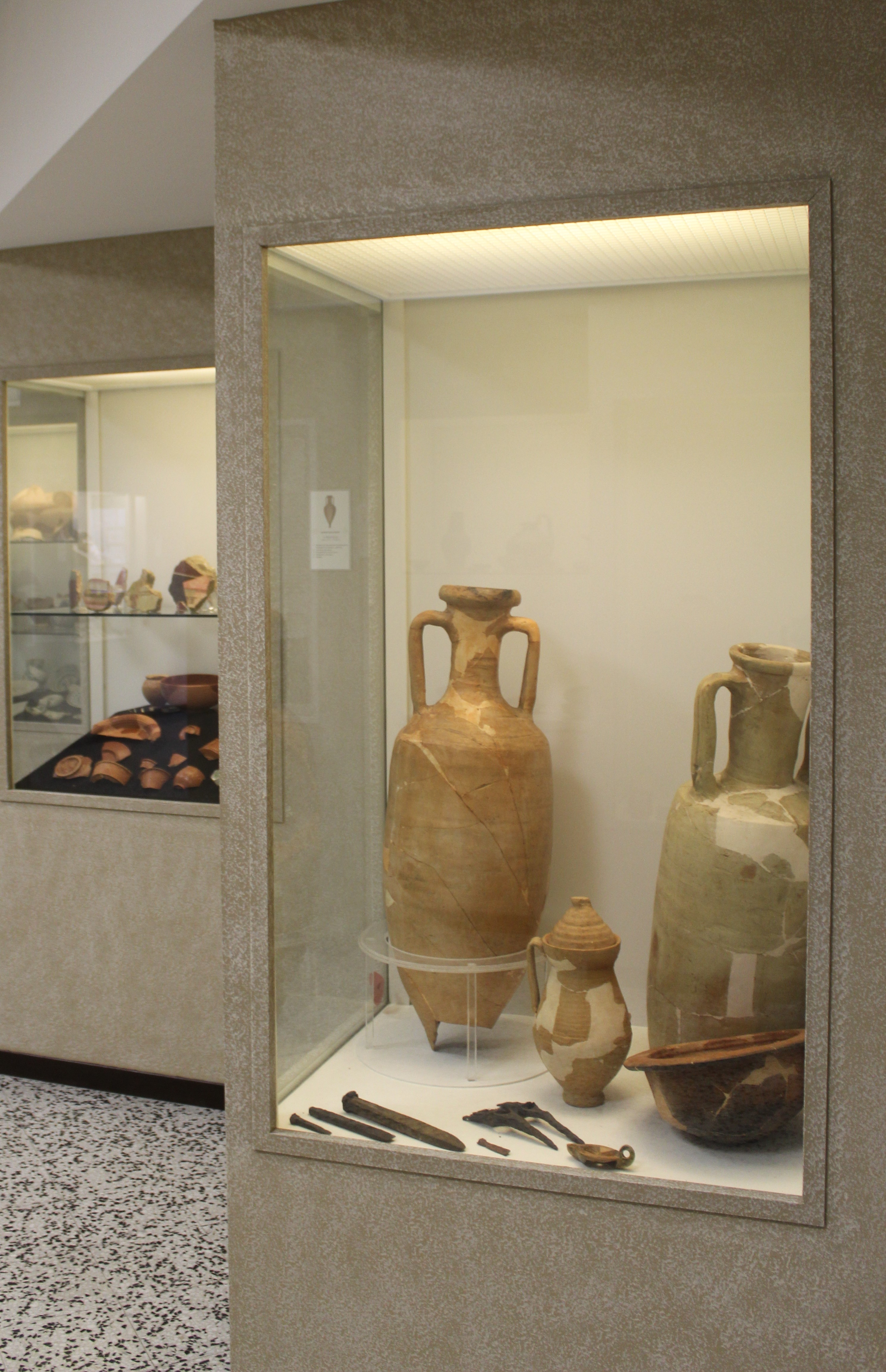
Wine amphorae from the Roman period, floor 2, room 3 of the Archaeological Museum of Magliano Sabina

The research carried out upstream of the Museum's installation offered a fairly accurate picture of the activities that took place on the farms but not of their structure while, as far as the villae are concerned, they left more evident signs on the ground, which made possible a hypothetical representation on a panel in this room.

From Colle Rosetta, a republican-era farm, materials related to agricultural activities come from and are exhibited: fragments of dolia (for storing foodstuffs and grains), amphorae for transporting wine (Greco-Italic amphorae), and other materials of daily use in addition to numerous fragments of fire ollae, basins and jugs, and black-glazed pottery in the forms of jugs, cups, and saucers. The presence of loom weights is an indication of spinning activities.

Two lava stone grain mills were recovered from the San Sebastiano Villa, consisting of an upper part called catillus, which was rotated on the lower part called meta to crush grains.

Displayed in the showcases are a selection of iron agricultural implements; wine amphorae, widespread in central Italy in the 1st century CE; ceramics of common use (jugs and ollae and basins); a sampling of tableware with a characteristic red color in the form of cups and saucers, on which graffiti with given names appear.

Architectural and decorative materials are to be referred to the urban part of the villa: fragments of marble cornices, fragments of plasterwork with geometric decoration in bright colors, antefixes in the form of winged victories, and fragments of glass panes on the windows.

=== Third floor ===
Materials discarded in selections for exhibition or awaiting restoration are stored here.

It is also here that fragments recovered from the area of the Ponti Novi Villa are stored. In the year 2000, during work on the Autostrada del Sole highway, archaeological material came to light from the excavations near the Magliano Sabina toll booth. It consists of fragments of common pottery in the types of jugs, ollae, and basins which are flanked by fire pottery. Numerous fragments of Dressel 2/4 amphorae and Dressel 20 oil amphorae attest to wine and oil production activity at the height of the imperial age.

It is relevant to note the number of fragments of painted plaster with medallion decoration with phytomorphic elements; marble fragments were also recovered.

== See also ==
- Tiber Valley
- Archaeological area of Poggio Sommavilla
- Foglia (Magliano Sabina)
- Falerii

== Bibliography ==
- Alvino, Giovanna (1997). I Sabini. La vita, la morte gli dei, Catalogo della mostra di Rieti, Sala dei Cordari [The Sabines. Life, Death, the Gods, Rieti exhibition catalog, Cordari Room.] (in Italian). Rome: Ministero dei Beni Culturali e Ambientali, Soprintendenza Archeologia del Lazio e dell'Etruria meridionale.
- Santoro, Paola (1977). "Rilettura critica della necropoli di Poggio Sommavilla" [Critical reinterpretation of the necropolis of Poggio Sommavilla]. Civiltà arcaica dei Sabini nella Valle del Tevere [Archaic Civilization of the Sabines in the Tiber Valley.] (in Italian). Vol. 3. Rome: Roma CNR.
- Cristofani Martelli, M (1977). "Per una definizione archeologica della Sabina: la situazione storico-culturale di Poggio Sommavilla in età arcaica" [For an archaeological definition of the Sabine: the cultural-historical situation of Poggio Sommavilla in the Archaic period]. Civiltà arcaica dei Sabini nella Valle del Tevere [Archaic Civilization of the Sabines in the Tiber Valley] (in Italian). Vol. 3. Rome: Roma CNR.
- Santoro, Paola (1997). Nardi, Giuliana (ed.). Etrusca et italica, Scritti in ricordo di Massimo Pallottino [Etrusca et italica, Writings in memory of Massimo Pallottino] (in Italian). Vol. 2. Pisa: Ist. Editoriali e Poligrafici. ISBN 888147025X.
- Santoro, Paola (1993). "Miscellanea etrusco-italica "Gli scavi a Poggio Sommavilla nell'Ottocento"" [Etruscan-Italic Miscellany “Excavations at Poggio Sommavilla in the Nineteenth Century.”]. In Cristofori, M (ed.). Quaderni di archeologia etrusco-italica [Notebooks of Etruscan-Italic Archaeology] (in Italian). Rome: Roma CNR.
- Guidi, Alessandro; Santoro, Paola (2004). "Centers of the Tiberian Sabina in pre-Roman times". In Patterson, Helen (ed.). Bridging the Tiber. Approaches to regional Archaeology in the Middle Tiber Valley. London: British school at Rome.
- Bettini, Maria Cristina; Nicosia, Alessandro (2009). I Sabini popolo d'Italia dalla storia al mito, Catalogo della Mostra, Complesso del Vittoriano di Roma [The Sabines - people of Italy from history to myth, Catalogue of the Exhibition, Vittoriano Complex, Rome] (in Italian). Rome: Gangemi Editori. ISBN 978-8849216455.
- Benelli, Enrico (2014). "I Sabini prospettiva archeologica" [The Sabines' archeological prospect]. In Lang, Peter (ed.). Entre archeologie et histoire: dialogues sur divers peuples de l'Italie préromaine. E pluribus unum? L'Italie de la diversité preromane a l'unité augusteenne, I, Etudes genevoises sur l'antiquité [Between archeology and history: dialogues on various peoples of pre-Roman Italy. E pluribus unum? Italy from pre-Roman diversity to Augustan unity, I, Etudes genevoises sur l'antiquité] (in French) (Multilingual ed.). Bern: Internationaler Verlag der Wissenschaften. ISBN 978-3034313247.
