= Faliscan language =

Extinct Italic language of the ancient Falisci

Faliscan
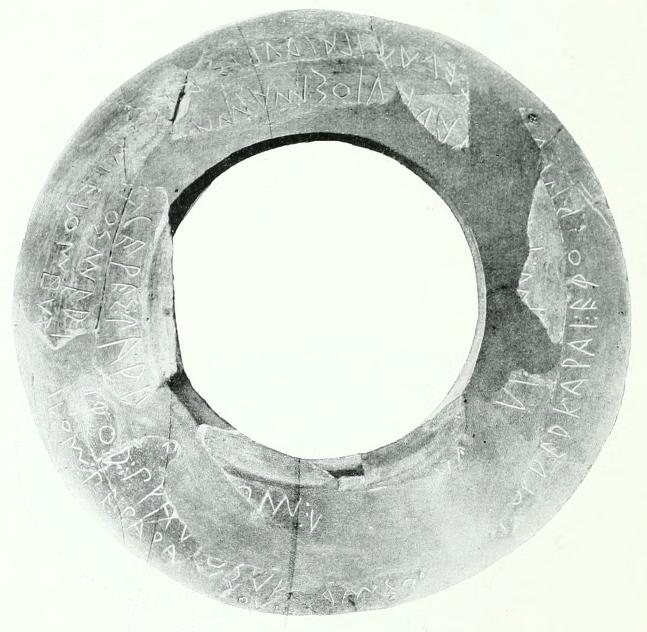
- Faliscan urn from Civita Castellana (CIE 8079), overhead view
- Native to: ancient Italy
- Region: Southern Etruria (Northern Lazio)
- Extinct: about 150 BC
- Language family: Indo-European: Italic; Latino-Faliscan; Faliscan
- Early forms: Proto-Indo-European: Proto-Italic; Proto-Latino-Faliscan
- Writing system: Faliscan, Etruscan, and Latin alphabets

Language codes
- ISO 639-3: xfa
- Glottolog: fali1291
- Faliscan is an Extinct language according to the classification system of the UNESCO Atlas of the World's Languages in Danger

The Faliscan language is the extinct Italic language of the ancient Falisci, who lived in southern Etruria at Tiber Valley. Together with Latin, it formed the Latino-Faliscan languages group of the Italic languages. It seems probable that the language persisted, being gradually permeated with Latin, until at least 150 BC.

== Corpus ==
An estimated 355 inscriptions survive, mostly short and dating from the 7th to the 2nd centuries BC. Some are written from right to left in a variety of the Old Italic alphabet, derived from the Etruscan alphabet, but they show some traces of the influence of the Latin alphabet. An inscription to Ceres of c. 600 BC, found in Falerii, usually taken to be the oldest example, is written left to right.

A specimen of the language appears written around the edge of a picture on a patera, the genuineness of which is established by the fact that the words were written before the glaze was put on: foied vino pipafo, cra carefo, Latin: hodie vinum bibam, cras carebo, lit. 'today I will drink wine; tomorrow I will not have any'. That sample indicates that Faliscan was less conservative in some respects than Latin, with the wearing down of final case endings and the obscuring of the etymology of foied "today", which is more obvious in Latin hodie (from hoc die). The inscription was made over a kylix red figure vase found in Penna's Necropolis of Falerii Veteres at Tiber Valley, it is now conserved at the Etruscan National Museum of Villa Giulia in Rome.

There are remains found in graves, which belong mainly to the period of Etruscan domination and give ample evidence of material prosperity and refinement. Earlier strata have yielded more primitive remains from the Italic epoch. Many inscriptions with mainly proper names may be regarded as Etruscan rather than Faliscan; they have been disregarded in the account of the dialect just given.

The town of Feronia, in Sardinia, was named probably after their native goddess by Faliscan settlers. A votive inscription from some of them is found at S. Maria di Falleri.

== Phonology ==
The phonetic characteristics of the Faliscan language include:

1. The retention of medial f, which Latin changed to b (FHEFHAKED /fefaked/ in the Praeneste fibula may be Proto-Latino-Faliscan);
2. The palatalization of d followed by consonantal i into some sound, denoted merely by i-, the central sound of foied, from fo-died;
3. The loss of final s, at least before certain following sounds (cra = Latin cras);
4. The retention with Latin of the labiovelars (cuando = Latin quando, compare Umbrian pan(n)u);
5. The assimilation of some final consonants to the initial sound of the next word: pretod de zenatuo sententiad (Conway, lib. cit. 321) = Latin praetor de senatus sententia (zenatuo for senatuos, an archaic genitive).

=== Problem of f and h ===
The question of irregular, unexpected developments of the Proto-Indo-European voiced aspirates in Faliscan, as opposed to the normal Latin rendering, is the appearance of both h and f as reflexes of *bh/*dh and *gh: filea 'daughter' and hileo 'son' = Latin filius ← Proto-Indo-European *dheh₁-lyo- and fe 'here' and hec = Latin hic ← Proto-Indo-European *ghey-ke.

In 1991, Rex E. Wallace and B. D. Joseph offered an explanation. They suggested that while it is documented also in Latin, it is the Faliscan material that provides a clearer picture of the supposed developments.

They remark that the unexpected outcomes are absent from the archaic Faliscan inscriptions and that the regular outcomes largely outnumber the irregular ones in the Faliscan epigraphic corpus. The unexpected outcomes show up only in middle and late Faliscan. The following are the only instances:

h for expected f:

hileo (son) Middle Faliscan
hirmia (gentilicium) Middle Faliscan (firmio is also attested)
hirmio (gentilicium) Late Faliscan
holcosio (gentilicium) Late Faliscan
haba 'a kind of bean' ← *bhabo- (cited by grammarian Quintus Terentius Scaurus as Faliscan)

f for expected h:

foied 'today' Middle Faliscan ← *gho:d d(i)ed
fe 'here' Late Faliscan ← *ghey-ke

Wallace and Joseph suppose that the first change is a natural sound change that can be seen in many languages (Spanish hijo 'son' from Latin filium 'son' [accusative]), which in Faliscan affected only a few possible candidate words. The second outcome cannot be explained as a sound change and so they argue it is a hypercorrect form caused by the other development. While the change from f to h was taking place and awareness of the correct forms was being lost, some speakers started restoring f even when it was not etymologically appropriate.

== Alphabet ==
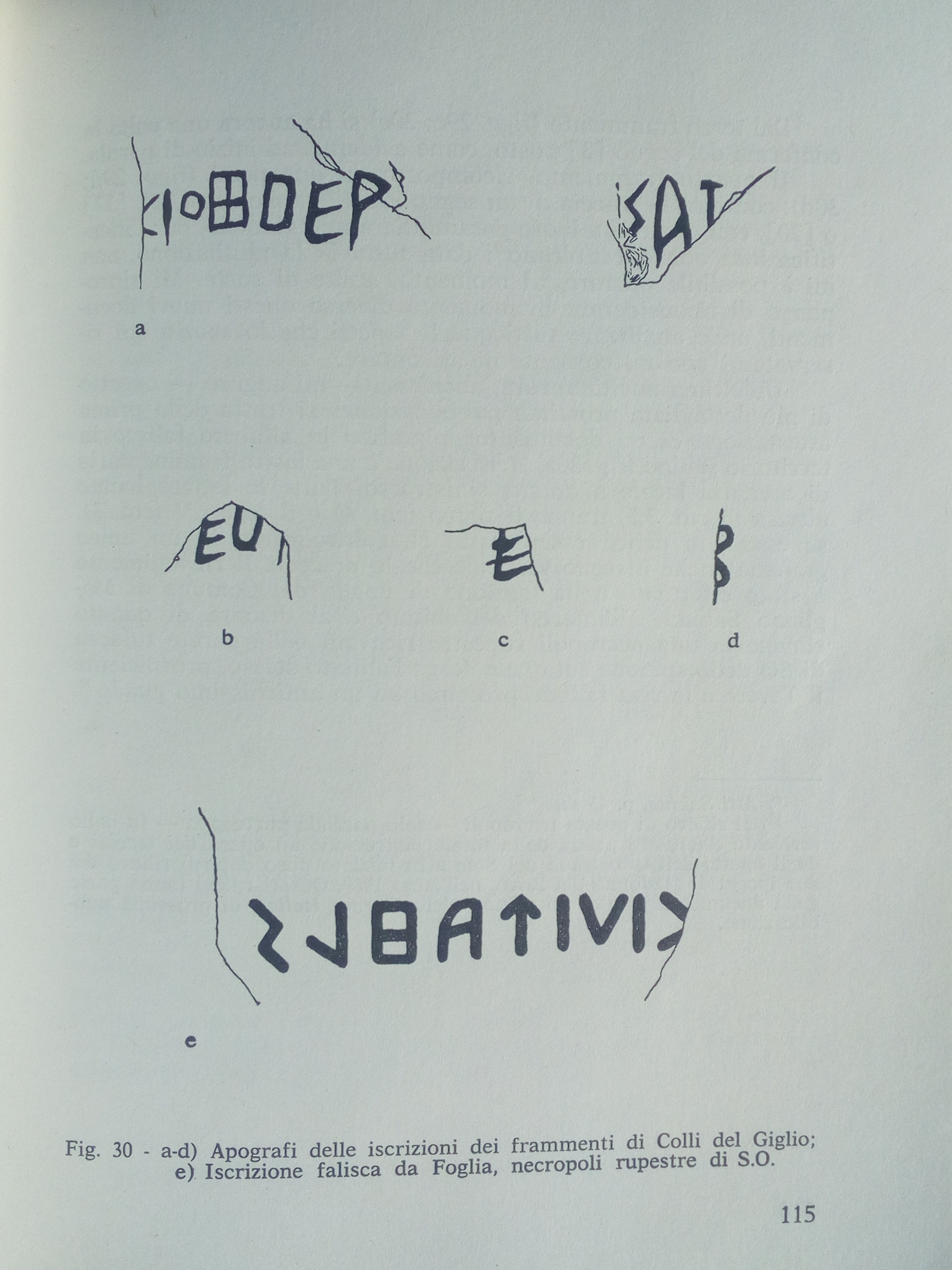
Faliscan Inscription of Foglia at Tiber Valley, written in the Faliscan alphabet.

Faliscan inscriptions were typically recorded in a unique Faliscan alphabet. This alphabet appears in the earliest Faliscan inscriptions; it dates back to the 7th century BCE. It possibly derives from Western Greek alphabets. However, it may also derive from the Etruscan alphabet, which potentially served as an intermediary between the Faliscan and Greek alphabets. Regardless, the ultimate source of the Faliscan alphabet is definitively Greek. During the transition from Greek to Faliscan, the Greek letter “γ” was transformed into “𐌂.” In some examples of graffiti, the letter is instead spelled like "𐌭." The Greek letter “κ” was transformed into “𐌊” and “ϙ” was adapted as “𐌒.” However, these three letters all represented the same phoneme. Over time, this redundancy caused the Faliscan, Etruscan, and Latin alphabets to alter the role of these letters within their alphabets. Faliscan dropped the letter “𐌒” and repurposed “𐌊” to represent the /g/ phoneme instead. One Early Faliscan inscription contains the word “eqo,” however “q” likely represents the /g/ phoneme. One, likely Faliscan, inscription engraved on a bronze contains the Latin letter “g.” It contains words such as “gonlegium” and “gondecorant.” These unusual spellings likely stem from a Faliscan writer who was uncertain about the proper usage of the letter “g.”

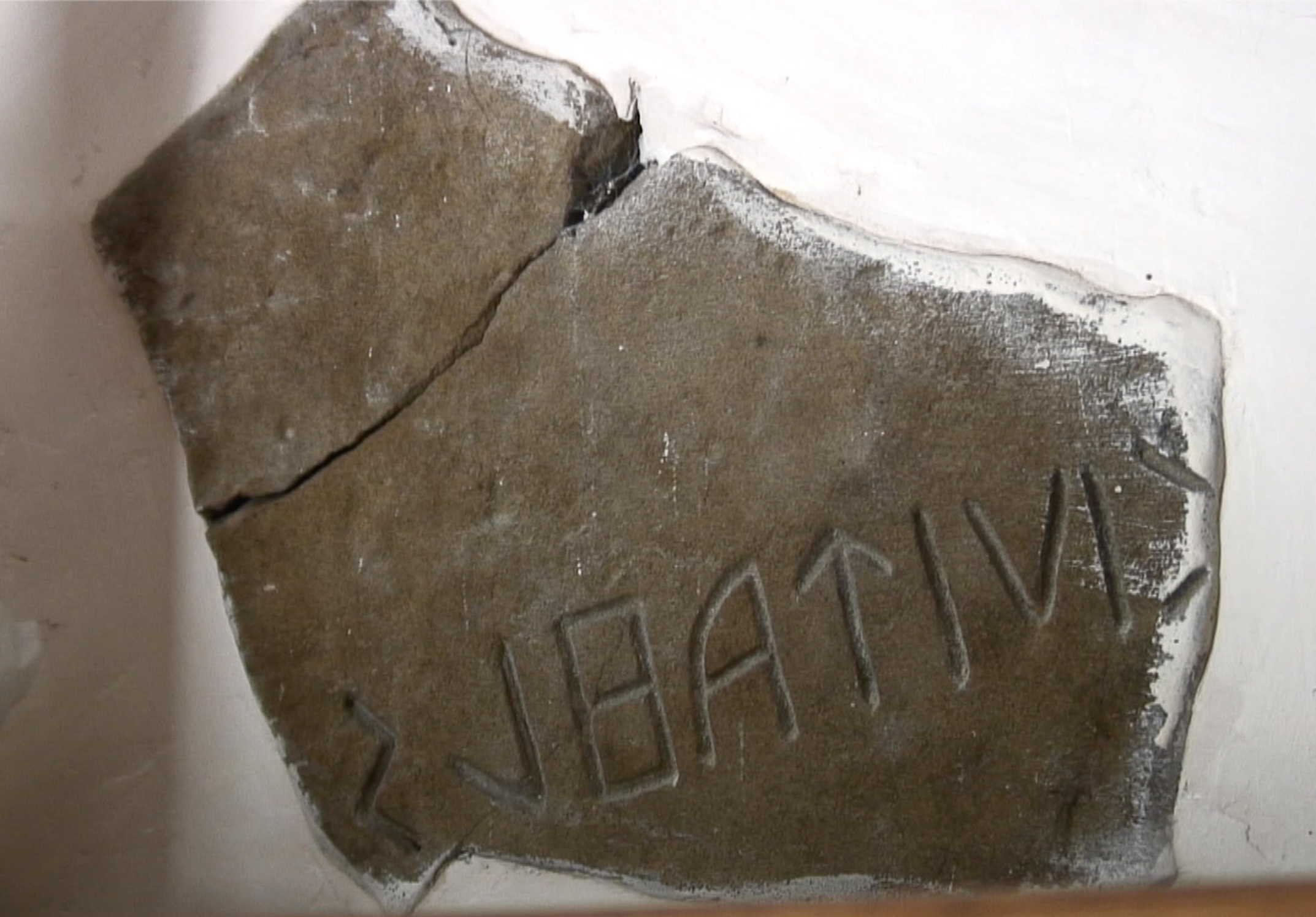
Sandstone inscription Faliscan language rock necropolis of Foglia Tiber Valley

The Greek letters “β,” “Θ,” and “δ” were not adopted into Faliscan. It is possible that “β” was never incorporated into Faliscan because the /b/ phoneme was rare in the language and the difference between /b/ and /p/ was morphologically irrelevant. However, there are several rare examples of Faliscan inscriptions containing the letter “𐌁.” One Faliscan inscription contains the text “Tito batio.” This discrepancy likely occurred due to Latin influence. The word “batio” may be a synonym for the Latin word “Battius”, which is found in Roman inscriptions. Unlike other Italic languages, Faliscan never adopted “𐌅”. Instead, it had its own unique sign, “𐋇,” for /f/. Theta, a Greek letter written as “Θ”, was also never formally incorporated into the Faliscan alphabet. However, it appears in a small number of Faliscan inscriptions. When used by the Faliscans, it was typically written like “.” The Faliscans likely opted for this method of writing the letter to avoid confusion with “𐌏.” This letter possibly represented the allophone /t/ in the few Faliscan inscriptions it appears in. The letter "𐌑," which was also common in Etruscan writing, was rare in Faliscan writing. It appears in two Faliscan inscriptions from Corchiano. Instead of the standard Etruscan "𐌑," "𐌌" was used in Early Faliscan writings. In Middle and Late Faliscan writings, "" was used instead.

Ancient Faliscan inscription from a 3rd-2nd century tombs in Contrada, Regoletti.

Faliscan inscriptions from all time periods utilize “𐌄” as the standard symbol for the /e/ phoneme. Sometimes, “,” a less common alternative that lacked the line protrusion at the bottom of the letter was used instead. There are rare instances of the variant “” replacing the standard letter. Although this variant may be a writing error, it occurs multiple times in separate Faliscan inscriptions, indicating that it may be a legitimate alternative to the more common version. Various cursive forms of the letter are known. “II” is the most common cursive form in Faliscan inscriptions and is also the cursive form used in Latin. One bronze strigil found near the necropolis by San Antonio one inscription contains the cursive variant “.” The inscription is possibly Middle Faliscan, however it is written in the Etruscan alphabet, and may be Etruscan. This is similar to an Etruscan letter “,” which was also found in a necropolis near San Antonio. One rare form of the Faliscan “𐌄” is "." This form appears in two inscriptions. Another example of this letter was found in a Latin inscription painted on the backs of three tiles in Ardea. These more unique cursive forms may also be cursive variants of “𐌇.” The symbol "𐌇" was also used in Middle and Late Faliscan inscriptions to represent the /h/ phoneme, In some inscriptions, “" is used instead. This shape may be a simplification of "𐌇," or possibly a new symbol inspired by the Latin "H." Another variant of "𐌇" is "." This form is a possibly cursive version of the letter and appears in only one inscription.

Faliscan inscription found on a cup in the Fosso del Ponte delle Tavole by Corchiano. The inscription is considered to be incomprehensible.

The transition from Early Faliscan to Middle Faliscan was accompanied by numerous changes to the Faliscan alphabet. Early Faliscan “A” or “𐌀” was changed into “,” a variant with an extended line and a slightly convex upper part. This variant was often confused with the letter “ᚱ.” During this time period, various cursive forms of “𐌀" emerged, such as "," ","," "𐌡," or ".” Another letter, "," is found in two Faliscan inscriptions. This may be a cursive form of the Latin letter "a." In the Early Faliscan alphabet, "𐌍" was used to represent the /n/ phoneme. However, by Middle and Late Faliscan, the variant "" was utilized. During the transition to Middle Faliscan, the letter “𐤨” was transformed into the larger variant "𐌊.” “𐌔,” “,” and “” are the standard forms of the letter “s” in Middle and Late Faliscan. It is extremely common for inscriptions to reverse the direction of their letters. In some inscriptions “” is used instead. This likely occurs due to a writing error. Greek “ζ” appears in a small number of Faliscan inscriptions. It is unclear if this letter represented a separate phoneme from “𐌔” or if it was exclusively an orthographic difference. It is possible that in some of the inscriptions containing “ζ” the letter represents the “/z/“ phoneme. However, the usage of this letter may result from Etruscan influence.

Throughout all of Faliscan history, “,” “,” and “𐊄” were used to represent the /t/ phoneme. The basic sign for /l/ was "𐌋," although sometimes a variant with a flattened bottom was used. The letter “𐌐” was typically used for the "/p/" phoneme. It has rare alternatives such as "Ρ" or "." The Faliscan letter “𐌏” which represented the “/o/“ phoneme, sometimes has a cursive variant with two open slits at the top and bottom.

== Declension ==
=== First declension ===
Like Latin, words of the Faliscan first declension nominative singular primarily ended in -a. Faliscan and Latin both transitioned their nominative plural forms from the Proto-Italic -ās to -aῐ. The first declension accusative singular form is exclusively attested in Early Faliscan inscriptions. Early Faliscan probably retained the lengthened version -ām, which comes directly from Proto-Italic. Later forms of the Faliscan language likely lost the vowel length, the ending instead becoming -am. Early and Middle Faliscan terms in the first declension genitive singular often end in -as, the same genitive singular form used in Old Latin. However, like Latin, it is possible that this form shifted to -ai with the progression of time, appearing in Middle and Late Faliscan inscriptions. The -ai form is also found used as a dative singular; it appears in sepulchral inscriptions such as "larise: mar||cna: citiai," which often read "[X] made this grave for [Y]." Late Faliscan inscriptions show the -a form as dative, although this likely derives from Latin influence. It is also possible that instead of representing a separate ending, it is merely a unique spelling of the "ae" sound. First declension ablative singular may have been -ad or -a, deriving from the Proto-Italic form /-ād/ either way. One singular Early Faliscan inscription suggests that the form -ad may have existed in the language; this form also appears in a Late Faliscan inscription, but possibly as an archaism not necessarily representative of contemporary linguistic developments. Another possible form, -a, also the ablative singular first declension form in Latin, appears in the word ifra from a Middle Faliscan inscription.

First declension
Case	Singular	Plural
Nominative	-a	aῐ
Accusative	-ām/-am)	
Dative	-ai/-a	
Genitive	-as/-ai	
Ablative	-ad/-a?	

=== Second declension ===
Early Faliscan inscriptions utilize the form -os as the second declension nominative singular, although this form is largely replaced by -o in later variations of the Faliscan language. Faliscan largely preserved the Proto-Italic form /-os/ while it was syncopated into -io in the Osco-Umbrian languages. However, there is at least one—possibly three—examples of the ending -io appearing in inscriptions from Capena, likely due to influence from neighboring Osco-Umbrian languages. The form -e, likely representing the vowel -ē, was used to represent the Faliscan second declension nominative plural. It is exclusively attested in the word lete, found in a Middle Faliscan inscription. This ending—-e—also appears as a vocative singular ending in the word uoltene from an Early Faliscan inscription. In the Faliscan second declension, the dative singular form was -oi and the ablative singular was -od. The ablative form has only been identified in Early Faliscan inscriptions, although it potentially transitioned to -o as Faliscan developed. Accusative singular and genitive plural second declension forms are attested with the ending -om, a remnant of the Proto-Italic form /-om/. Early Faliscan inscriptions often contain the second declension genitive singular ending -osio, although Middle and Late Faliscan inscriptions utilize the genitive singular form -i. In one Middle Faliscan inscription containing the word cicoi, the ending -oi likely functioned as a genitive singular form. Other Faliscan writings have been theorized to contain the genitive singular endings -io and -oio; the Faliscan scholar Dr. Gabriël Bakkum considered these theories to be unsupported by existing evidence, arguing these interpretations are misreading of the text.

Second declension
Case	Singular	Plural
Nominative	-os/-o	-e
Accusative	-om	
Dative	-oi	
Genitive	-oi?/-io?/-osio?	-om
Ablative	-od/-o?	
Vocative	-e	

=== Third declension ===
The little evidence for the Faliscan third declension nominative singular indicates that, like Latin, Faliscan third declension words may have been marked by the stems /-ō/, /-ns/, /-ks/, or /-nts/. This declension possibly contained the accusative singular form -em for consonant-stem terms, although this is only attested in terms such as arute which have been interpreted as either nominatives or accusatives used as nominatives. Another neuter accusative singular form is found in the word far from an Early Faliscan inscription, likely derived from Proto-Italic */-fars/. Genitive singular forms for the third declension are also attested in the existing Faliscan corpus; the third declension consonant-stem genitive singular ending -os was considered by Italian scholar Gabriella Giacomelli to be one of the primary morphological distinctions between the Faliscan and Latin languages. However, this analysis is contradicted by Dr. Gabriël Bakkum, who notes that Old Latin and Faliscan both shared the genitive singular form -os. The archaeological record suggests that the Faliscan third declension may have contained the stem -i in the nominative singular form. These -i stem words may have used the ending -es as their nominative plural and the genitive singular form -e, likely representative of either the /-is/, /-es/, /-eʰ/, /-eˀ/, /-ẹʰ/, or /-ẹˀ/ phonemes. The -i stem genitive plural is attested in the word [fel]ịcinatu from a Late Faliscan inscription. This form resembles the Proto-Indo-European ending /-i-om/ and the Old Latin form -iom.

Third declension
Case	Singular	Plural
Nominative		-es?
Accusative	-em?	
Genitive	-e?	

=== Fourth and Fifth Declensions ===
The Faliscan fourth declension accusative singular is exclusively attested for in a Late Faliscan inscription containing the phrase macistratu keset, a direct equivalent of the Latin phrase magistratum keset. Although this direct translation makes certain the reading of macistratu as an accusative singular, it also implies that the text may have adopted Latin characteristics and is therefore not fully reflective of Faliscan. The genitive singular form of the fourth declension may have been -uos, deriving from the Proto-Italic genitive ending */-oŭs/. This form is evidenced by a Late Faliscan inscription reading de | zenatuo · sententiad. However, this text may not have been Faliscan, it can be read as a Latin instead. If the text was Faliscan, it may not have reflected the standard rendition of the language; -uos was possibly an uncommon ending compared to a hypothetical -ōs. The word mercui has been identified as possessing a dative singular ending of the Faliscan fourth declension; the form -ui likely represented either the /-uǐ/ or /-ūǐ/ phonemes. Very little of the Faliscan fifth declension has been identified in the existing Faliscan corpus. The word dies, restored from an incomplete Middle Faliscan inscription, may contain the nominative singular ending of the fifth declension. The fifth declension ablative singular ending may have been -ed; it is possibly attested in a Middle Faliscan inscription containing the adverb foied.

Fourth declension		Fifth declension
Case	Singular	Singular
Nominative		-es?
Dative	-ui?	
Genitive	-uos?	
Ablative		-ed?

== Verb ==
Like the Latin and Sabellic languages, the Faliscan language obeys a four-conjugation system. The first conjugation is attested in Faliscan verbs such as cupat, a cognate of the Latin cubat. Athematic laryngeal verbs, such as the words porded and pipafo, were possibly also included within the first conjugation. The second conjugation includes the verb salueto, the third conjugation is attested in words such as fifiked, and the fourth conjugation is largely unattested. The word douiad may have been a fourth conjugation word, although it is more likely to be a mixed conjugation word.

Faliscan verbs were conjugated according to tense, although only the present, perfect, and future tenses are attested for in the surviving Faliscan corpus. The Faliscan future tense was seemingly differentiated from the other tenses through the suffix /-f/, it appears in the second conjugation word carefo. The Faliscan perfect was distinguished through the perfect stems, unique stems marking the verb as perfect from which the word can be conjugated. In Faliscan, perfect stems can be generated through reduplication, such as in the verbs fifiked and pe⁝parai. Perfect forms may have also been distinguished through a sigmatic aorist. Sigmatic forms possibly appear in the verb keset, a synonym of Latin gessit. Other words, such as faced, may have been perfect forms that lost their reduplicative syllable or descended from old aorists.

Different moods within the Faliscan language are attested; the imperative ending /-te/ is evidenced through the word saluete—identified in an Early Faliscan inscription—and possibly the word urate, from an Early Faliscan or Etruscan text. Early Faliscan writings contain evidence of the future imperative endings /-tōd/ in the word saluetod. The words pramed and douiad—found in Early Faliscan texts—may be first conjugation subjunctives. These forms indicate that Faliscan had an ē-subjunctive and an ā-subjunctive respectively. The verb "to be" contained subjunctive forms such as seite, likely derived from the Proto-Indo-European optative mood.

=== Primary and secondary endings ===
Ending meaning	Faliscan primary ending	Faliscan secondary ending
I	/-ō/ as the first-person singular ending is attested in words such as pipafo and carefo, both of which were found in Middle Faliscan inscriptions. /-m/ is attested in esum, the first-person singular active indicative form of the verb "to be."	
you sg		/-s/ may have been the second-person singular, it is contained with an Early Faliscan document mentioning the subjunctive word tulas.
he/she/it	/-t/ appears as the third-person singular ending in verbs such as cupat and lecet, both of which were found in Middle Faliscan texts.	/-d/ is possibly found in Early Faliscan writings as a third-person singular ending in the subjunctive words douiad and potentially pramed.
we		
you pl		/-te/ is found in Early Faliscan inscriptions as a potential second-person plural ending in the subjunctive word tulate and possibly seite.
they	/-nt/ is attested as the third-person plural ending in a Middle Faliscan text containing the word cupant.	The ending /-nd/ is found in an incomplete Early Faliscan inscription.

=== Perfect stems ===
Ending meaning	Perfect stem
I	-ai, attested in the word pe⁝parai from an Early Faliscan inscription.
you sg	
he/she/it	-e -d, attested in the words fifiked from an Early Faliscan inscription and faced from a Middle Faliscan inscription. The endings -et, pronounced /-ēt/ is also attested in the word facet from a Middle Faliscan text and the word keset from a Late Faliscan inscription. The archaeological record indicates that the ending shifted from -ed to -et during the shift from Early to Middle Faliscan. This shift also occurred in Latin.
we	
you pl	
they	-o-nd, attested in the word fifiqod from an Early Faliscan inscription.

== Sample text ==
Latin inscription written in the Faliscan alphabet from Santa Maria di Falleri.

The following Faliscan text was engraved on a bronze tablet fastened with rivets. It is the youngest known inscription in the Faliscan alphabet; it is not significantly older than 150 BCE. It was a public dedication and utilizes the same language used by local officials. The left half was found in 1860 and the right half was found in 1870, the same year the full text was assembled and published:

"menerua· sacru

la·cotena·la·f·pretod·de

zenatuo·sententiad·uootum

dedet·cuando·datu·rected

cuncaptum"

Although it contains an almost entirely Faliscan orthography, it still has several distinctly non-Faliscan features. Such as the "oo" in "uootum."

Another Faliscan inscription was identified on an impasto pitcher dating back to the 7th century BCE. The original text contained no word separation. It reads:

"ecoqutoeuotenosiotitiasduenomduenassalue[to]duoltene:"

If it were written with word separation the text would read:

"eco quto(n)e uotenosio titias duenom duenas salue[to]d uoltene."

Translated, it means:

"I the-good pitcher of-Voltenus (and) of-the-good Titia. Let-it/he-greet, Voltenus."

The following Faliscan inscription dates back to the 7th or 6th century BCE and was identified on shards from a vase found in a tomb:

"ceres : far me[re]tom/me[lc]tom or me[lq]tom/me[le]tom or me[la]tom : *[3-5]uf[1-4]ui[..]m : p[ore]kad or a[dkap]iad euios : mama z[e]xtos med f[if]iqod/f[ef]iqod : prau[i]os urnam : soc[iai] porded karai : eqo urnel[a] [ti]tela fitai dupes : arcentelom huti[c?]ilom : pe:para[i] (por)douiad ["

Translated, it reads:

"May Ceres extend/accept deserved/honeyed/ground spelt [3-5]uf[1-4]ui[..]m. Euius Mama Sextus fashioned/made me. Prauius/a-good?-(man) gave the-vase for-(his)-dear girlfriend."
