= Poggio Sommavilla =

Town in Italy

- Frazione
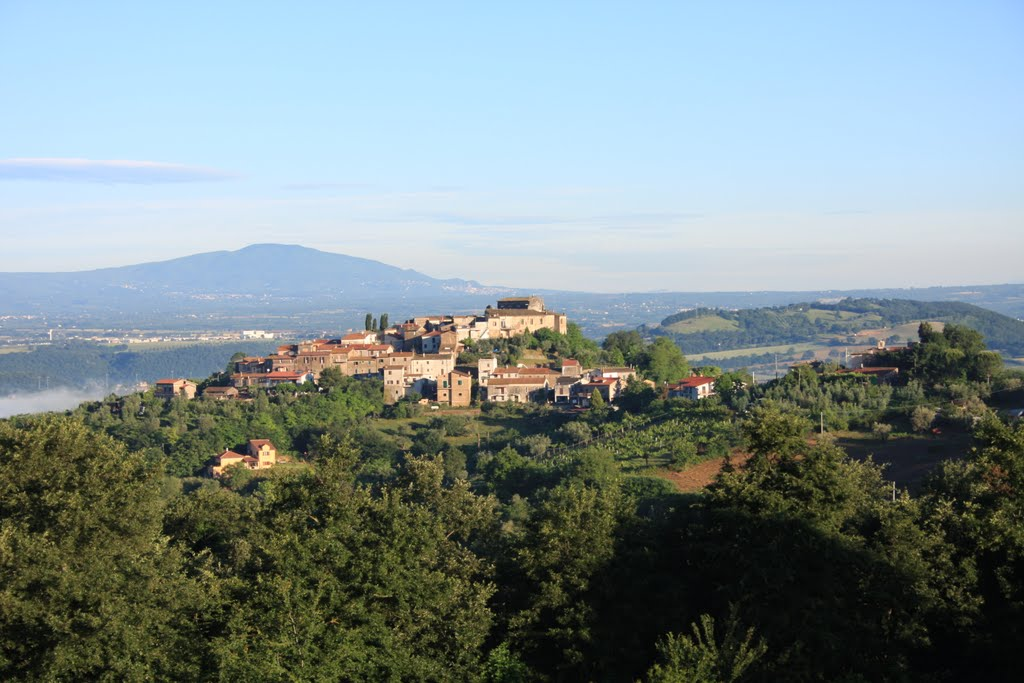
- View Poggio Sommavilla on fluvial teraces of Tiber Valley

- Location of Poggio Sommavilla in Italy
- Coordinates: 42°18′31″N 12°31′35″E
- Country: Italy
- Region: Lazio
- Province: Province of Rieti
- Comune: Collevecchio
- Demonym: Poggettani (detti Tassi)
- Time zone: UTC+1 (CET)
  - Summer (DST): UTC+2 (CEST)
- Postal code: 02042

Poggio Sommavilla or Poggetto (Local dialect: Poggettu) is a frazione of Collevecchio, Lazio region at Tiber Valley in Italy. It is known for the discovery of archaeological finds from prehistory.

== History ==
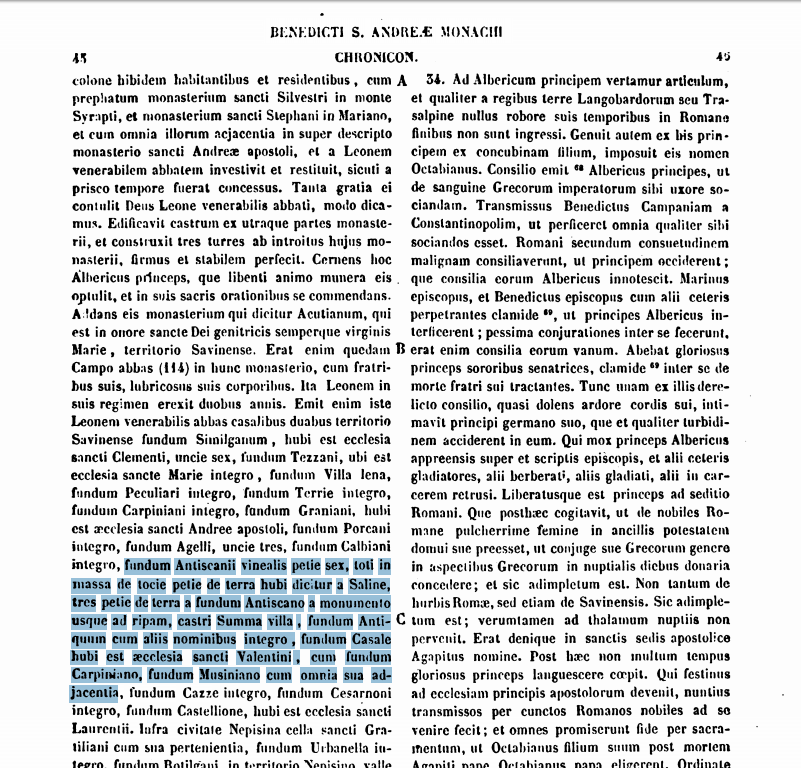

The toponym Poggio Sommavilla is cited by Chronicon 33 of Soratte in the early Middle Ages as Castri Summa Villa, because it was built on the remains of a villa from the imperial Roman era, built following the destruction by the Roman Republican army of the archaic center of which the name is not yet known. Archaeological evidence of this is provided by the statues of the villa stolen in 1600 for the Khircheriana collection and the discovery of a statue by a farmer between 1876-1891 in the locality dei Frati in the northern part of the current historic centre, today they are preserved in Rome at the National Roman Museum.

== Archaeological site ==
- Archaeological area of Poggio Sommavilla
- Grappignano [ it ]
- Toccia [ it ]

== Museum ==
- Civic archaeological museum of Magliano Sabina [ it ]

== Infrastructure and transport ==
- Railway station Collevecchio-Poggio Sommavilla [ it ]

== See also ==
- Tiber Valley
- Foglia
