= Magliano Sabina =

Municipality in Lazio, Italy

- Comune
- Comune di Magliano Sabina
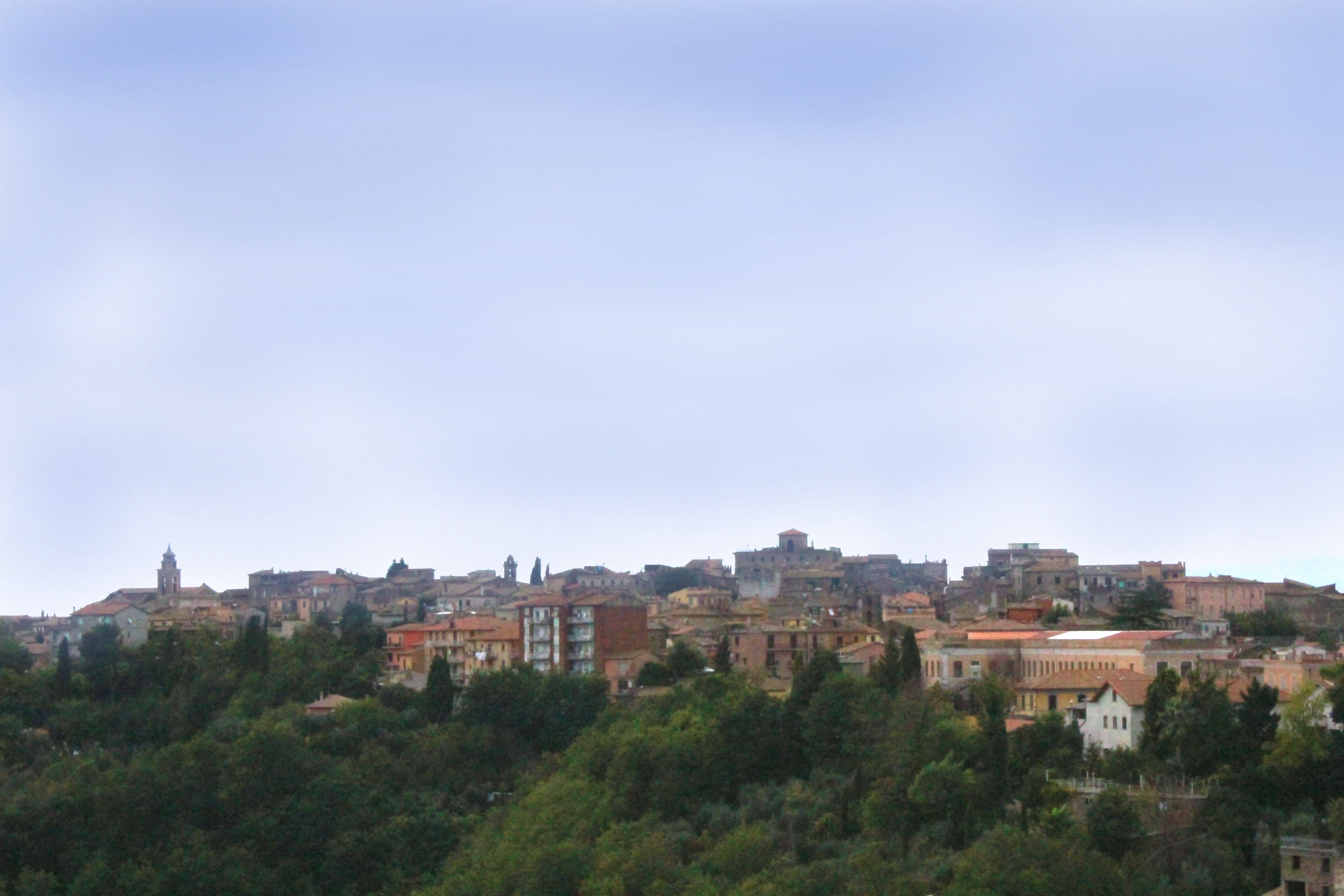
- View of Magliano Sabina

- Location within Italy Location within Lazio
- Coordinates: 42°22′N 12°29′E
- Country: Italy
- Region: Lazio
- Province: Province of Rieti (RI)

Area
  - Total: 43.7 km^{2} (16.9 sq mi)
- Elevation: 222 m (728 ft)

Population (Dec. 2004)
  - Total: 3,829
  - Density: 87.6/km^{2} (227/sq mi)
- Demonym: Maglianesi
- Time zone: UTC+1 (CET)
  - Summer (DST): UTC+2 (CEST)
- Postal code: 02046
- Dialing code: 0744
- Website: Official website

Magliano Sabina (Local dialect: Majjanu) is a comune (municipality) in the Province of Rieti in the Italian region of Latium, at Tiber Valley.

== Territory ==
Located long Tiber Valley, about 65 kilometres (40 mi) north of Rome, about 35 kilometres south of Terni, 40 kilometres east of Viterbo and 50 kilometres (31 mi) west of Rieti. As of 31 December 2004, it had a population of 3,829 and an area of 43.7 square kilometres (16.9 mi^{2}).

Magliano Sabina borders the following municipalities: Calvi dell'Umbria, Civita Castellana, Collevecchio, Gallese, Montebuono, Orte, Otricoli.

Its frazione of Foglia is one of I Borghi più belli d'Italia ("The most beautiful villages of Italy").

The Cathedral is also known as the Concattedrale di San Liberatore Vescovo e Martire.

== Demographic evolution ==
Historical population

| Year | Pop. | ±% |
|---|---|---|
| 1861 | 2,436 | — |
| 1871 | 2,501 | +2.7% |
| 1881 | 3,116 | +24.6% |
| 1901 | 3,723 | +19.5% |
| 1911 | 4,096 | +10.0% |

| Year | Pop. | ±% |
|---|---|---|
| 1921 | 4,140 | +1.1% |
| 1931 | 4,104 | −0.9% |
| 1936 | 4,264 | +3.9% |
| 1951 | 4,386 | +2.9% |
| 1961 | 4,348 | −0.9% |

| Year | Pop. | ±% |
|---|---|---|
| 1971 | 3,672 | −15.5% |
| 1981 | 3,577 | −2.6% |
| 1991 | 3,702 | +3.5% |
| 2001 | 3,745 | +1.2% |

Source: Data from ISTAT

== Gallery ==
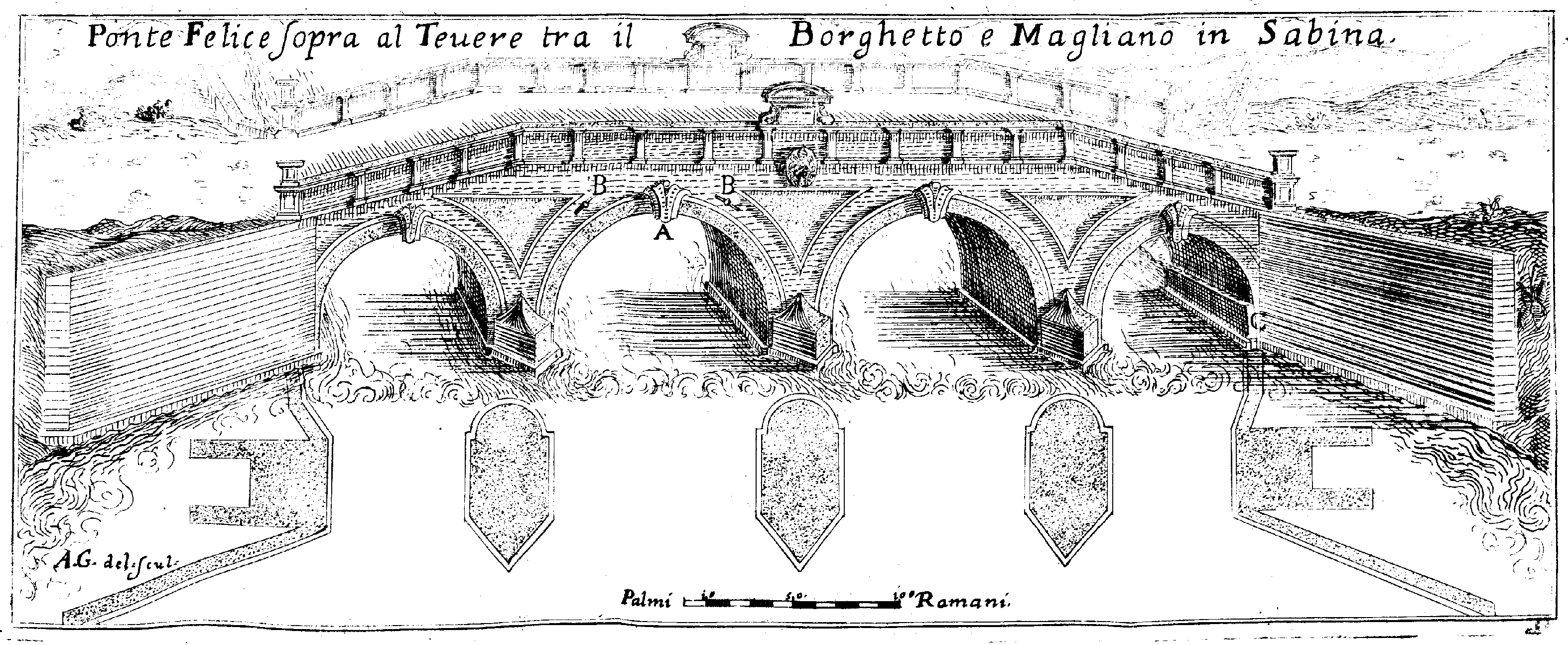
The old Felice bridge in 1676

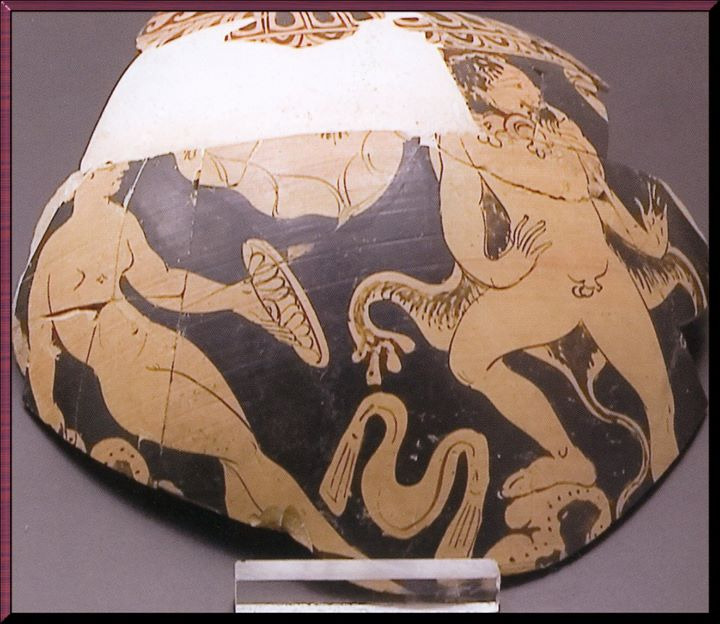
Stamnos red figure ceramic attic vase in the Civic Archaeological Museum of Magliano

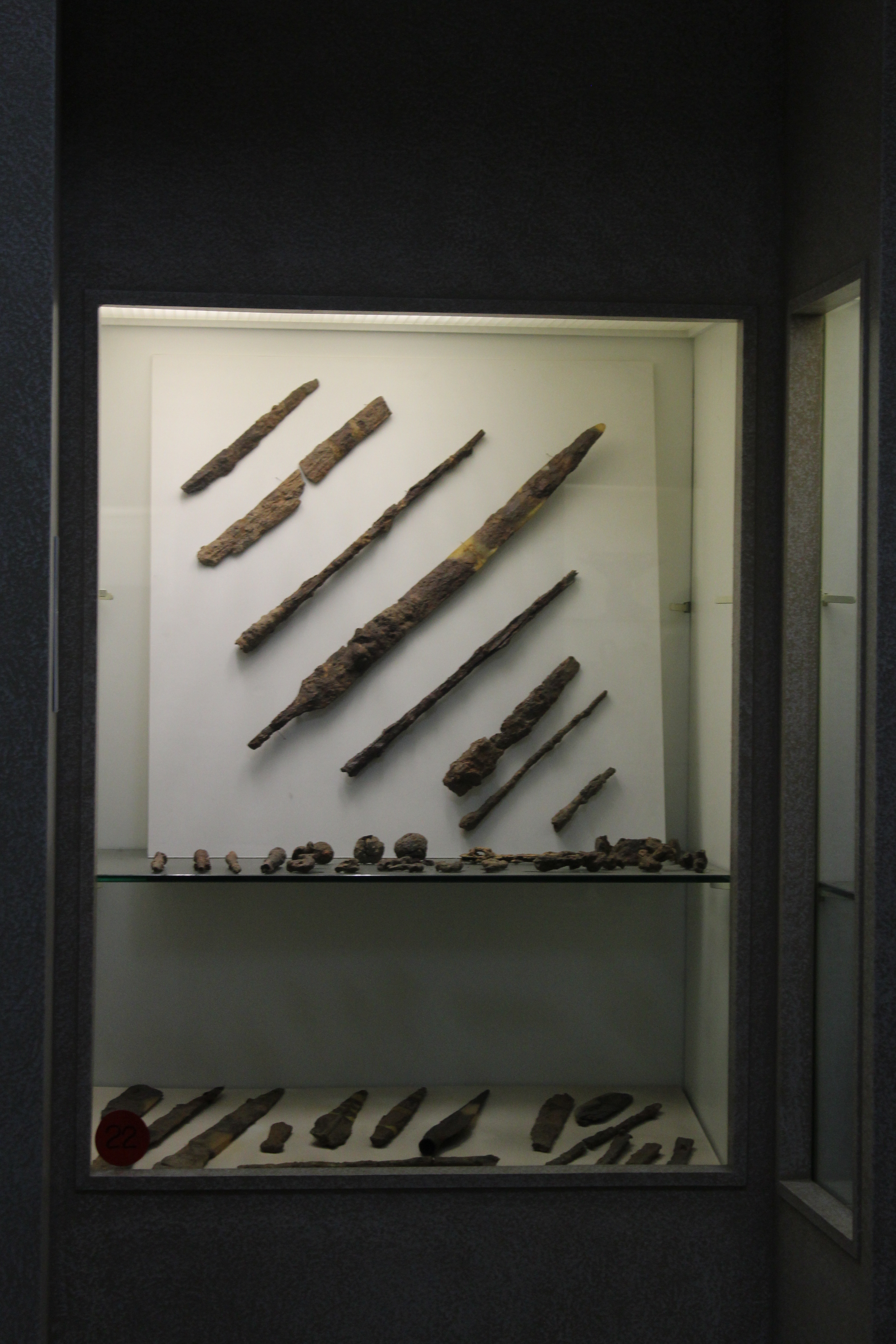
Archaic iron weapons from the Archaeological Museum of Magliano Sabina

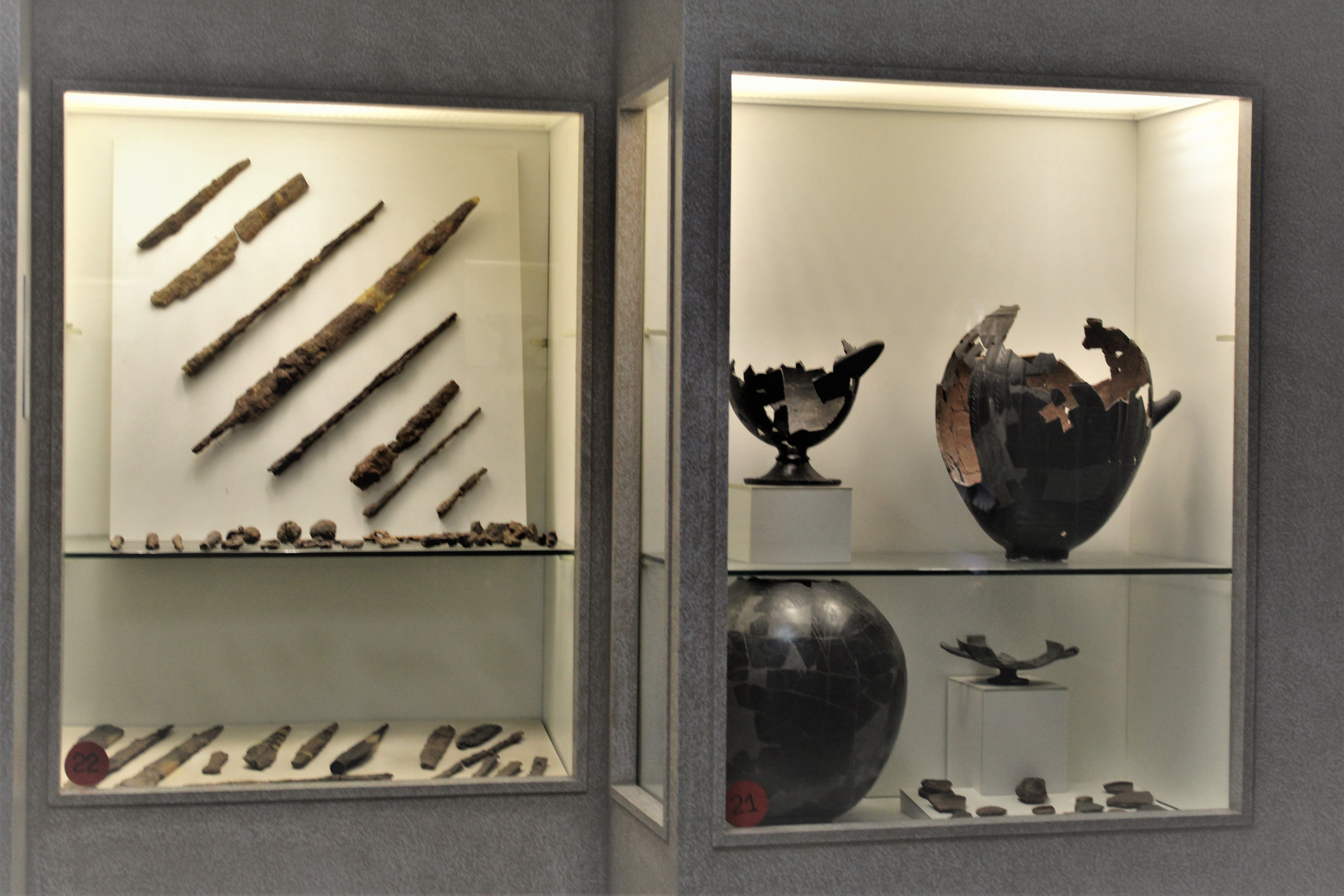
Iron and bronze repert in the Civic Archaeological Museum of Magliano

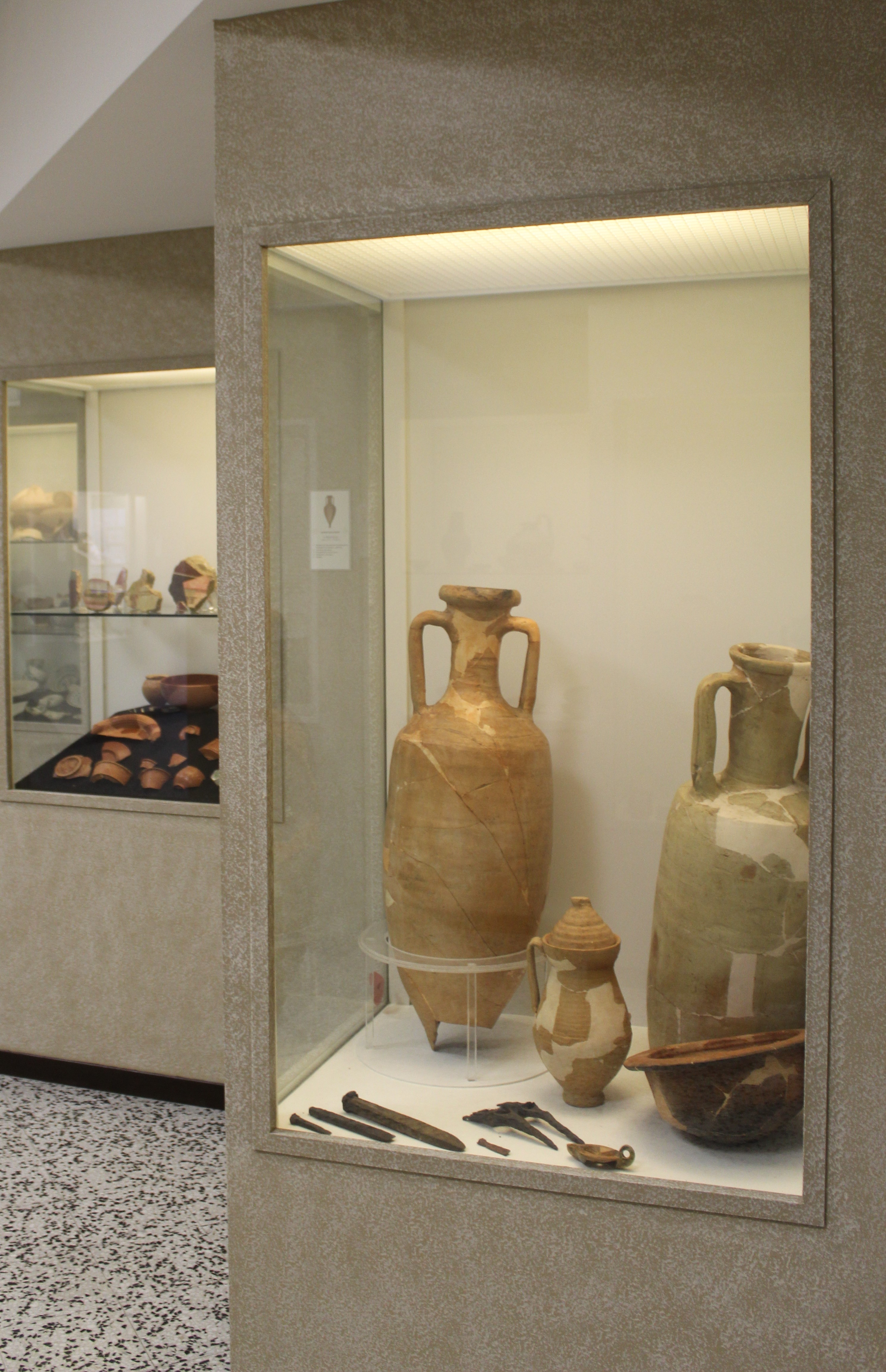
Roman anphore in the Civic Archaeological Museum of Magliano

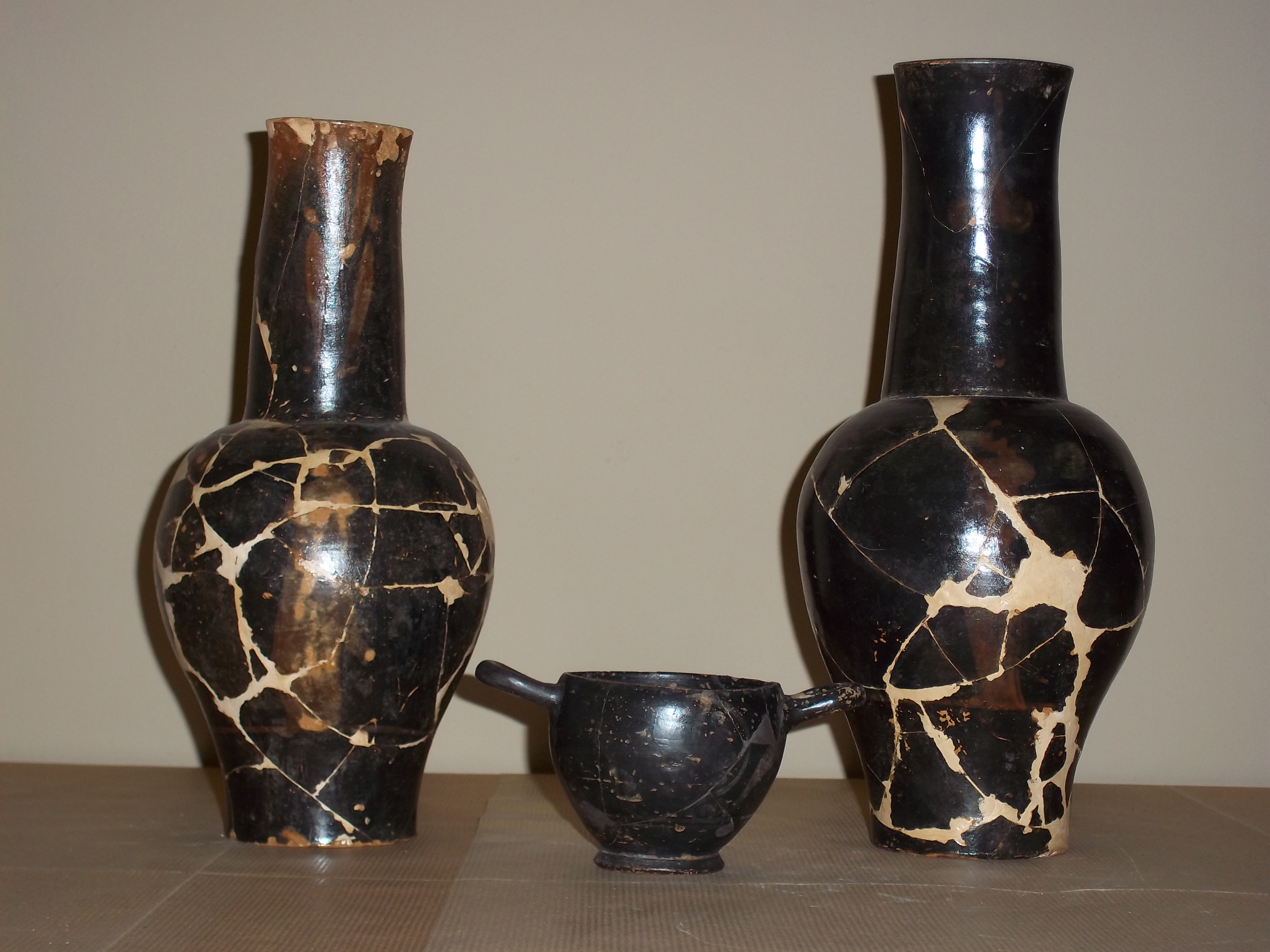
Archaic aphore in the Civic Archaeological Museum of Magliano

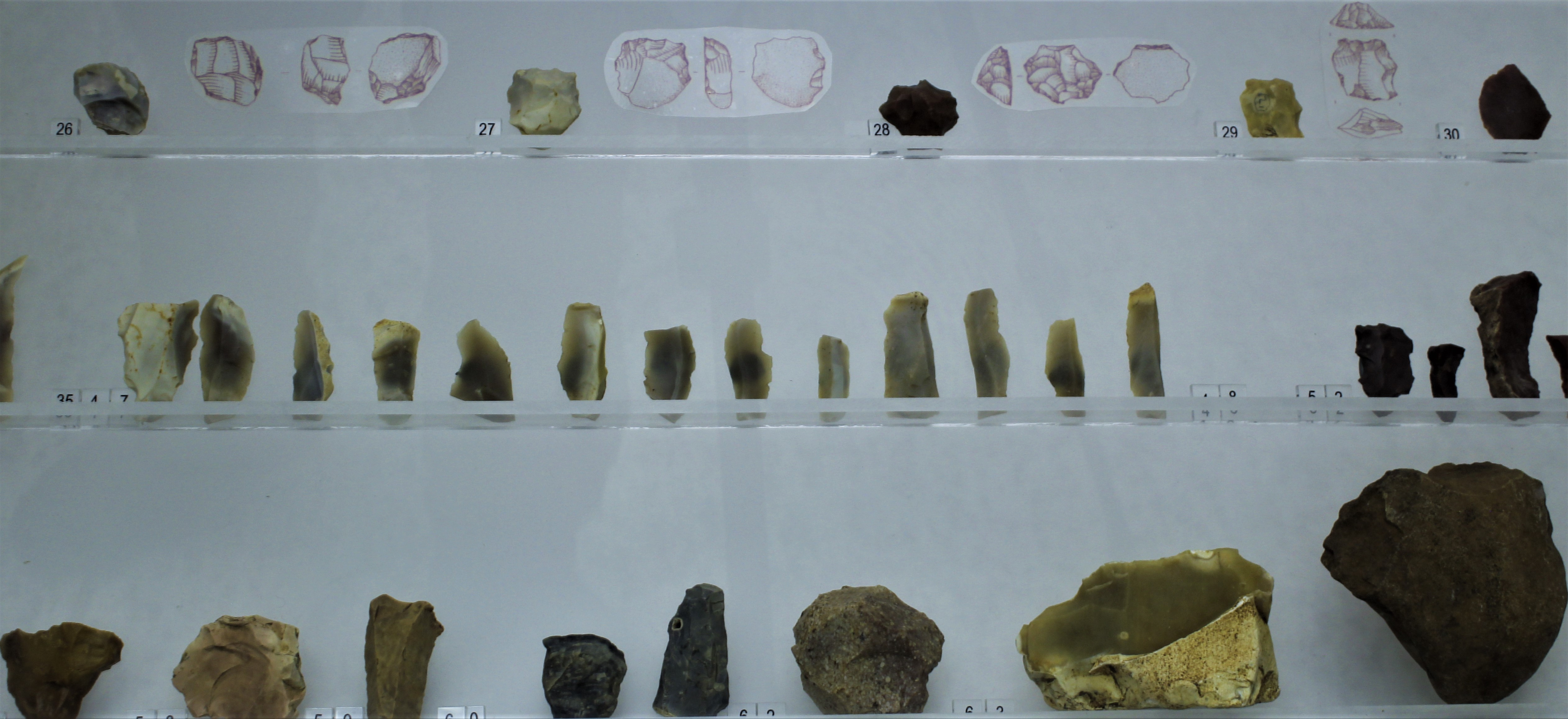
Litic repert, flint scrapers, Archaeological area of Poggio Sommavilla, at Civic Archaeological Museum of Magliano

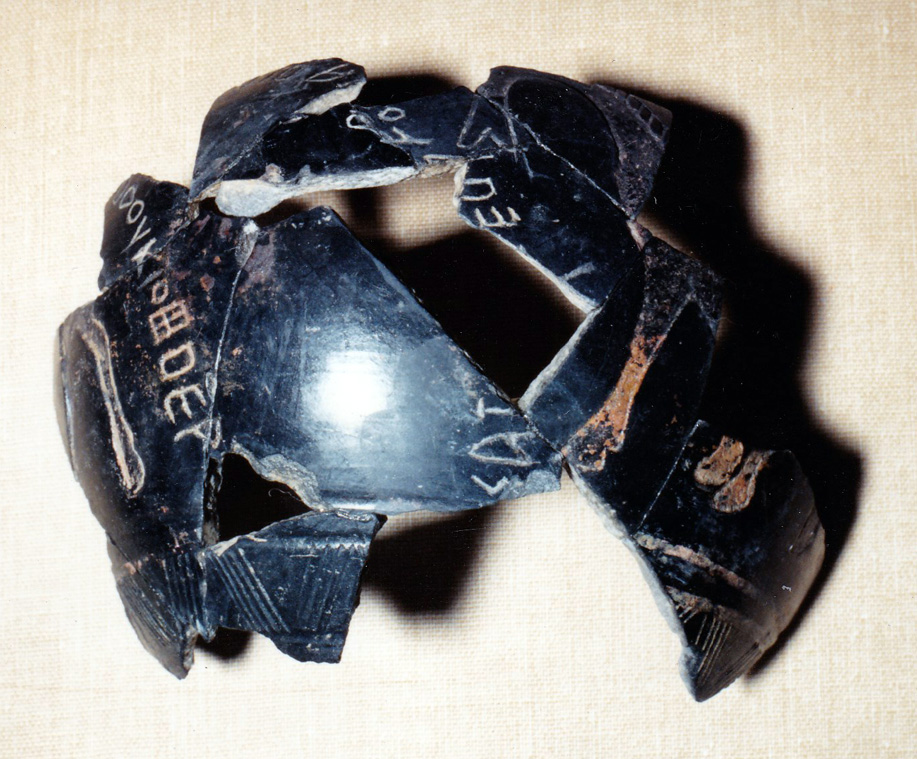
Olletta with archaic inscription of Gilio's necropolis, Civic Archaeological Museum of Magliano

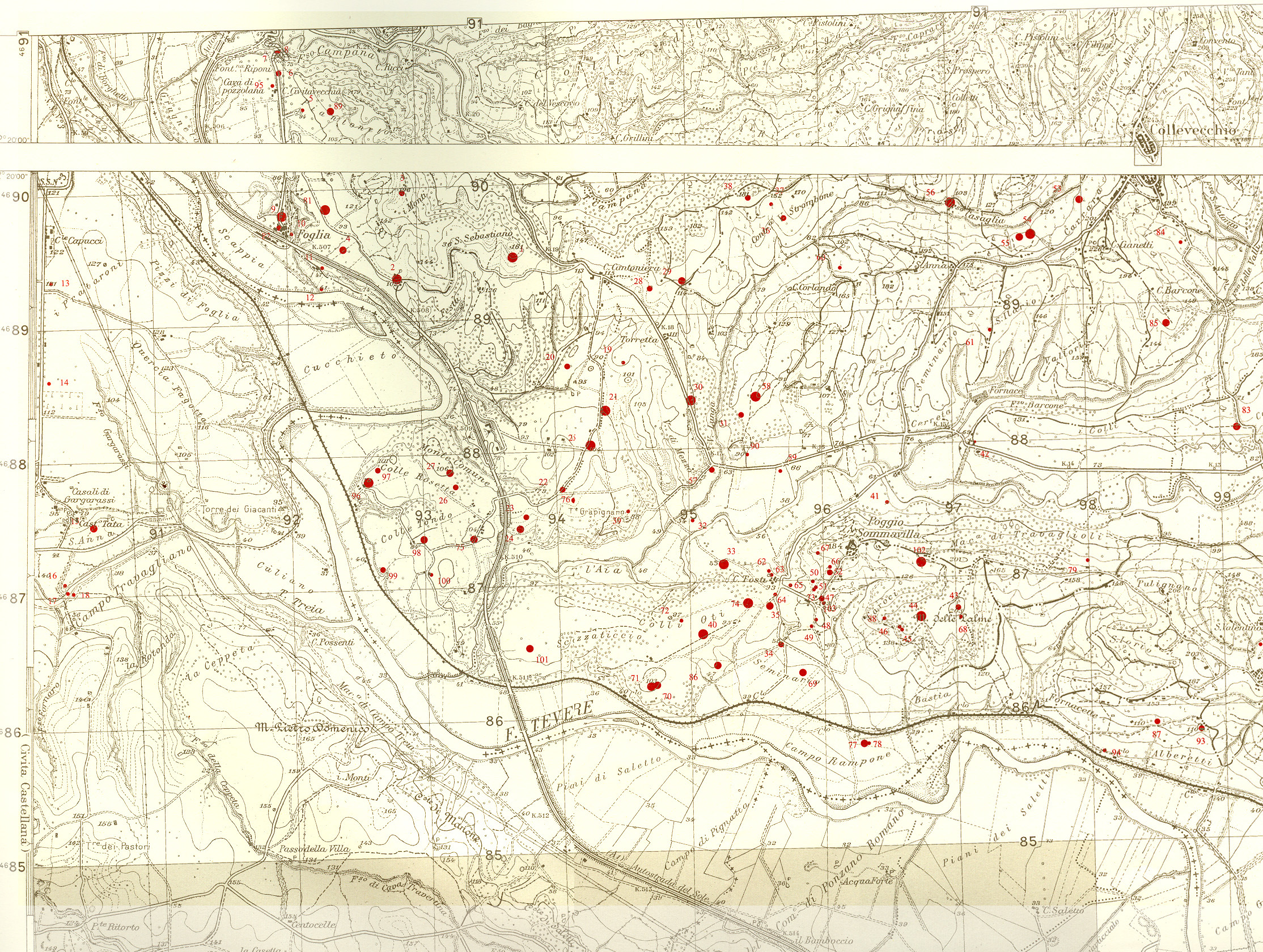
Flaminia Verga, Archaeological map of Tiber Valley, Florence 2006

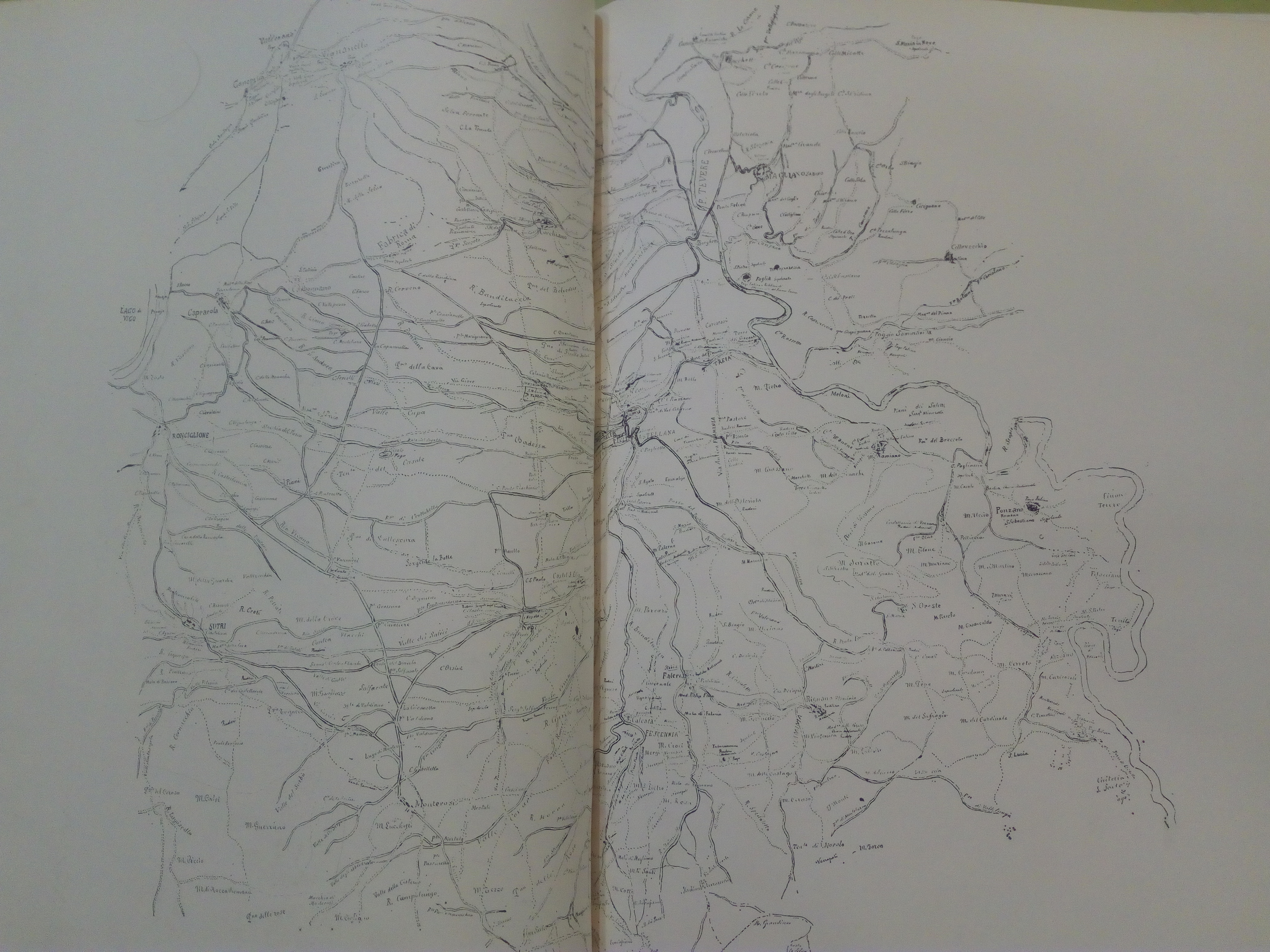
Magliano Sabina in Archaeological map - Falerii e la sua regione rivelata dai sepolcreti, Mancinelli Scotti Francesco

== Museum ==
- Civic archaeological museum of Magliano Sabina [it]

== See also ==
- Foglia (Magliano Sabina)
- Tiber Valley
- Archaeological area of Poggio Sommavilla
