= Foglia (Magliano Sabina) =

Community in Lazio

- Frazione
- Coordinates: 42.33129°N 12.47393°E
- Country: Italy
- Region: Lazio
- Province: Rieti
- Comune: Magliano Sabina
- Elevation: 85 m (279 ft)

Population (2001)Stat
  - Total: 44
- Time zone: UTC+1 (CET)

Foglia is a frazione of the Italian comune of Magliano Sabina, in the province of Rieti, Lazio.

== Geography ==
Foglia is located on a tuff plateau in the Tiber Valley, between the mouth of the Campana creek to the north and the Aia stream to the south, almost opposite the mouth of the Treja river on the Tiber.

== History ==
=== Prehistory - archaic era ===
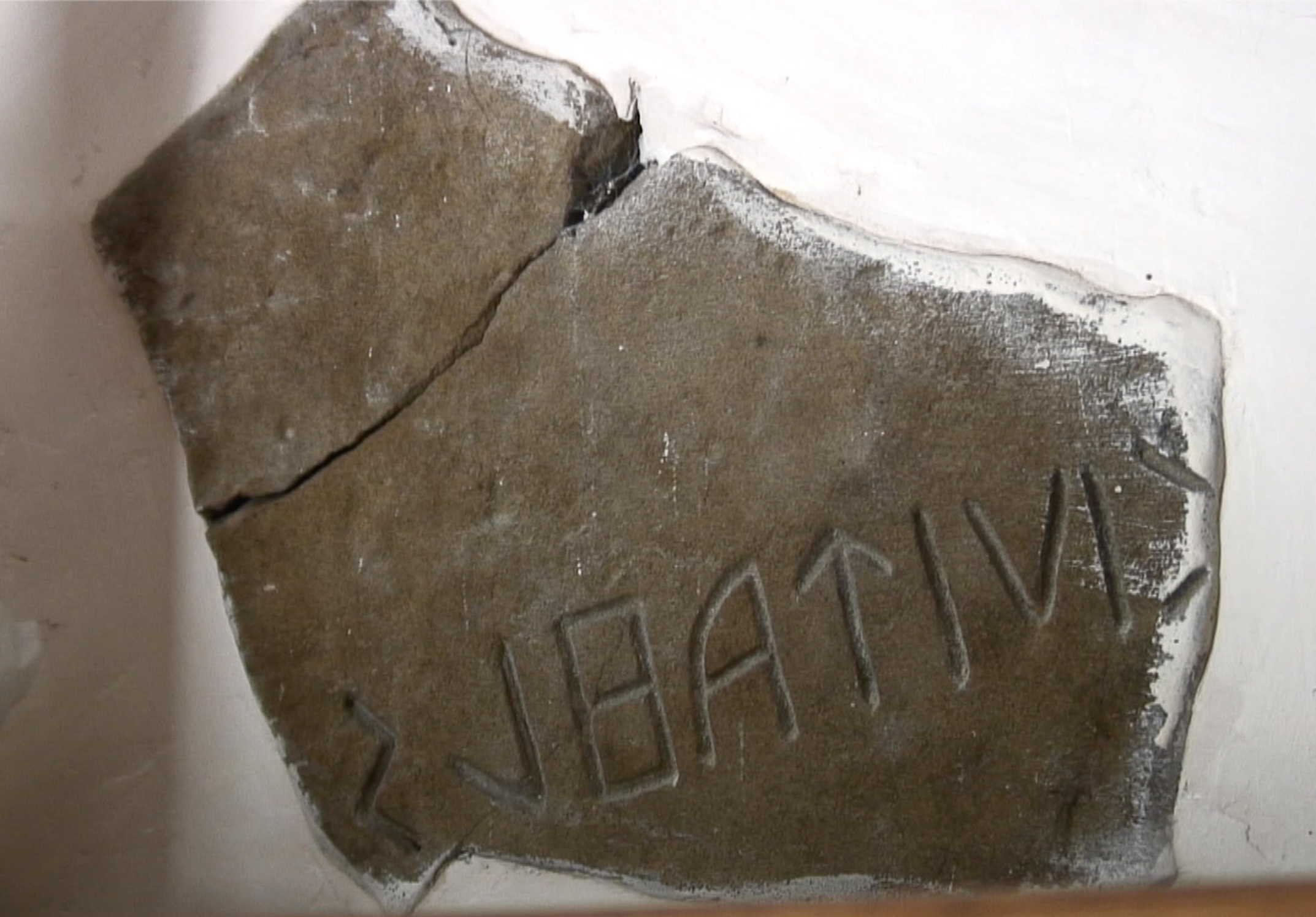
Sandstone inscription Faliscan language rock necropolis of Foglia, Tiber Valley

The town sits close to an ancient ford of the Tiber where it joins the Tiber Valley between Treja and Aia valley an prehistory-archaic way to Archaeological area of Poggio Sommavilla and Falerii Veteres. Inside the town, on the side of the Autostrada del Sole, and above what remains of a necropolis created in the tuff plateau on which the town itself stands, is an inscription in the Faliscan alphabet where a dictus was found. It is located on a slab of local sandstone. The letters are 3.5 centimetres (1.4 in) in height, except the sigma which is 4 centimetres (1.6 in) and the V sign which is 3 centimetres (1.2 in).

=== Contemporary ===
In 1817 Foglia was an autonomous municipality; it was then annexed from 1827 to 1853 to the municipality of Collevecchio and then, from 1853, to the municipality of Magliano Sabina, of which it is still a frazione.

== Places of interest ==
- Church of Santa Serena, or Santa Maria Assunta, believed by local tradition to be the place of retreat of Serena of Rome, wife of the Roman emperor Diocletian; it was rebuilt in 1579. It has a copy of the Madonna del Rosario by Sebastiano Conca.
- Foglia is part of the I Borghi più belli d'Italia.

== Gallery ==
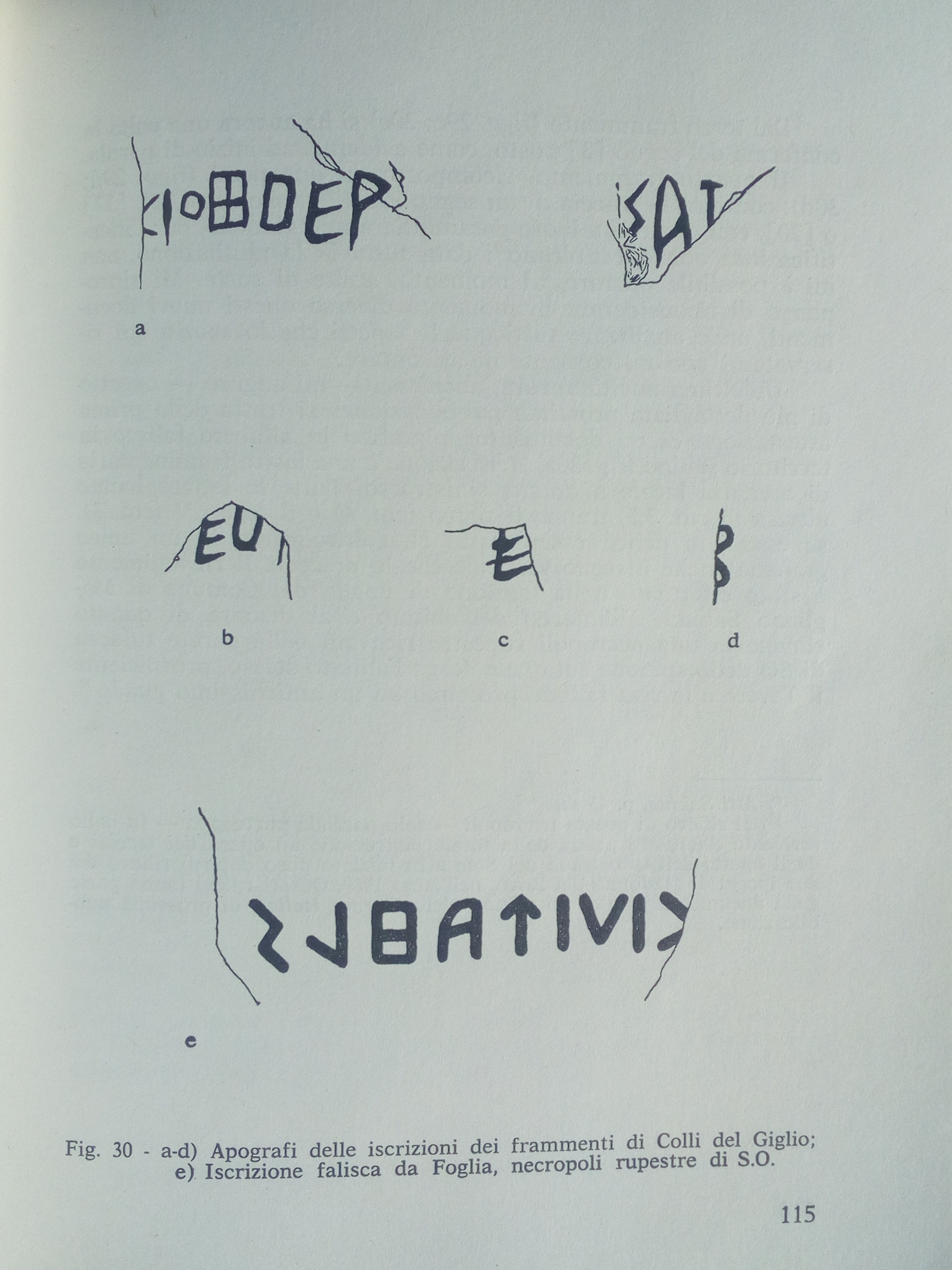
Inscription in Faliscan language, rock necropolis of Foglia

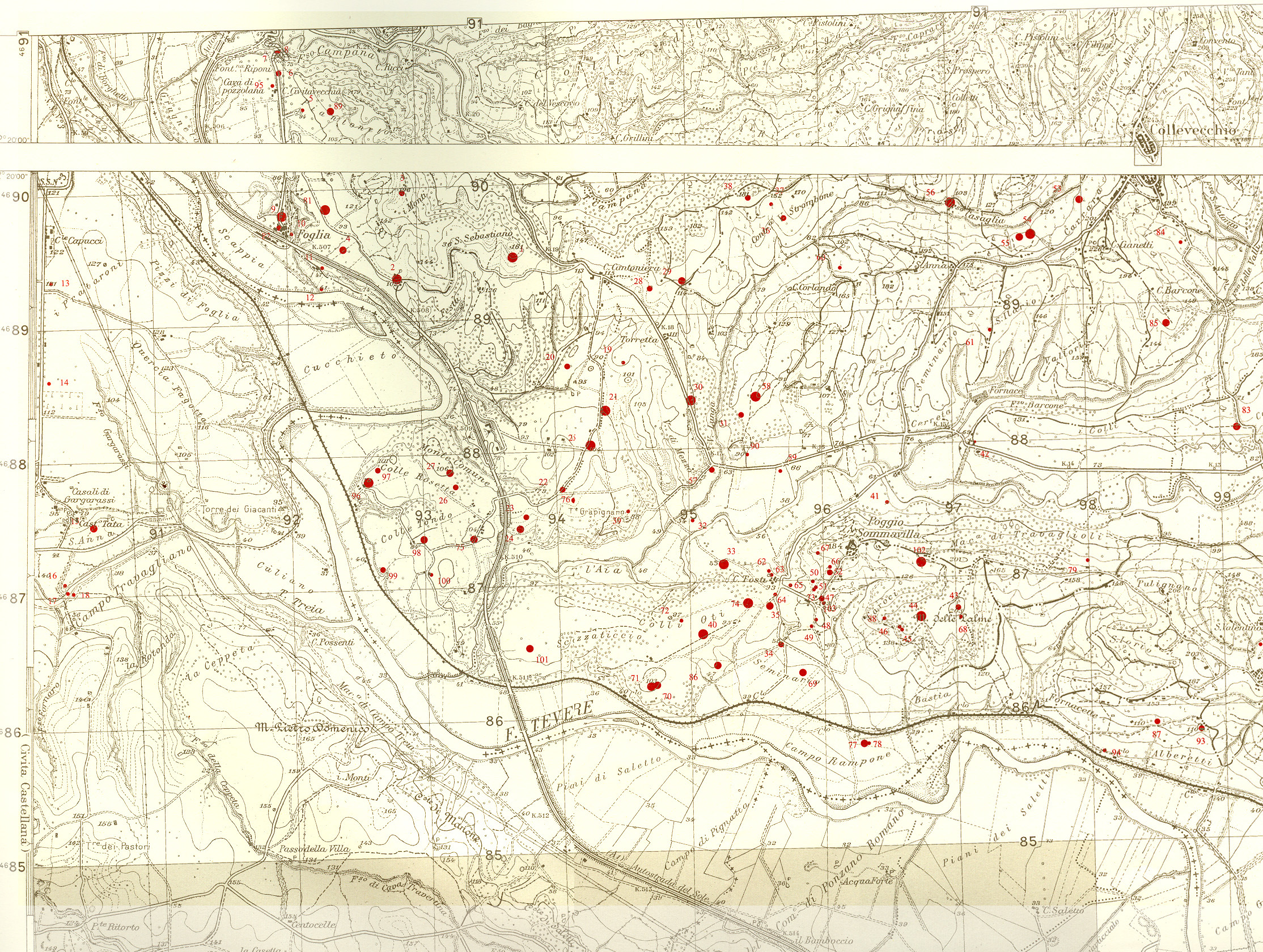
Flaminia Verga, Archaeological map, Florence 2006

== See also ==
- Tiber Valley
- Grappignano
- Archaeological area of Poggio Sommavilla
- Archaeological Museum of Magliano Sabina
