= Impasto (pottery) =

Type of ancient Etruscan pottery

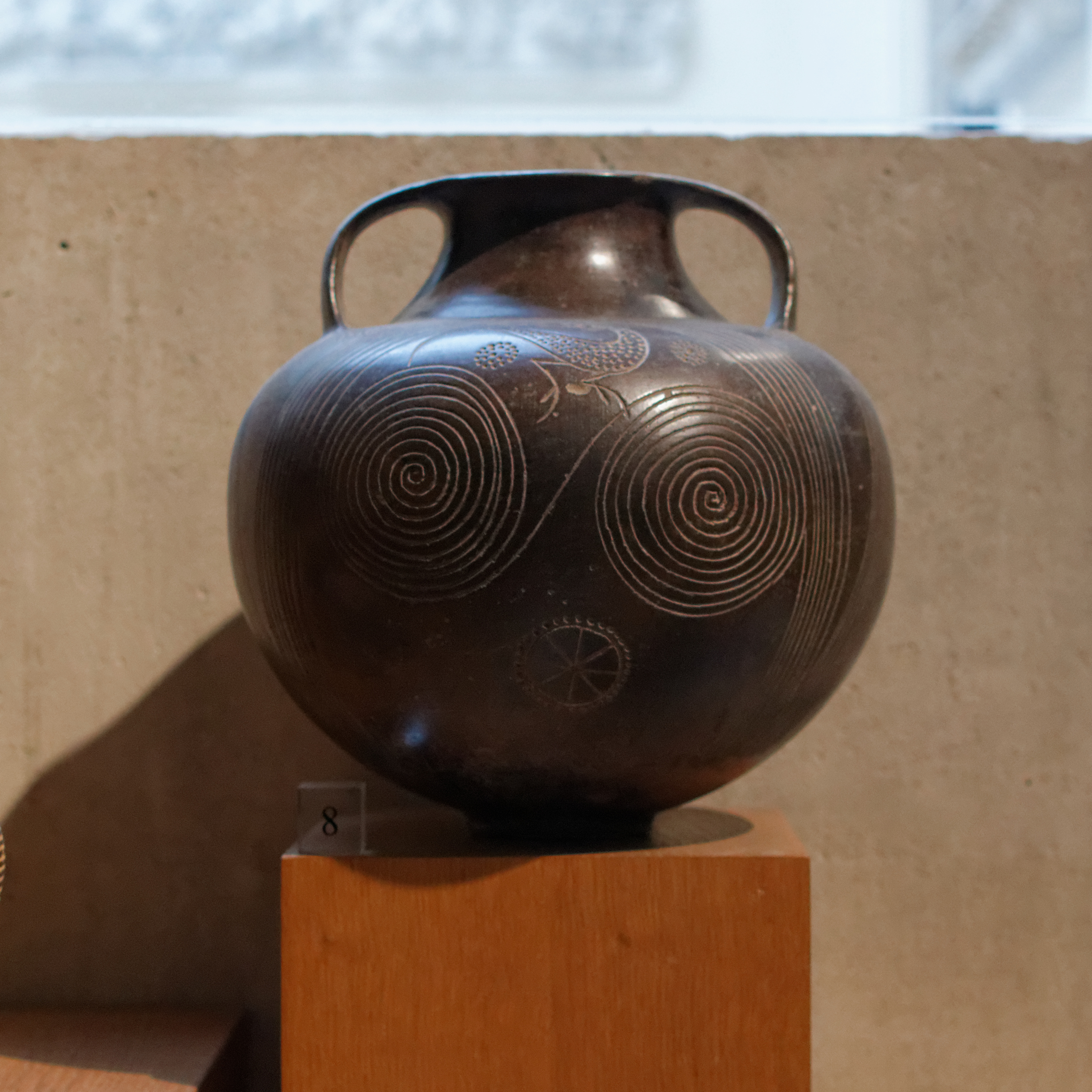
An Etruscan impasto amphora, Louvre.

Impasto is a type of coarse Etruscan pottery. The defining characteristic is that the clay contains chips of mica or stone.

In G.A. Mansuelli's, The Art of Etruria and Early Rome (1964), the term "impasto pottery" is described in the following way: "Ceramic technique characteristic of hand-worked vases. By 'impasto pottery' is generally meant that of pre-historic times, of the Iron Age or later, made of impure clay with silica content." (p. 236)

== See also ==
- Bucchero
